= List of Unbreakable Kimmy Schmidt episodes =

Unbreakable Kimmy Schmidt is an American sitcom created by Tina Fey and Robert Carlock, starring Ellie Kemper in the title role, that has streamed on Netflix since March 6, 2015. Originally set for a 13-episode first season on NBC for spring 2015, the show was sold to Netflix and given a two-season order. The fourth and final season concluded on January 25, 2019. On May 8, 2019, it was announced that the series would return with an interactive special, which premiered on May 12, 2020. During the course of the series, 52 episodes of Unbreakable Kimmy Schmidt were released over four seasons.

The series follows 29-year-old Kimmy Schmidt (Kemper) as she adjusts to life in New York City after her rescue from a doomsday cult in Indiana where she and three other women were held by Reverend Richard Wayne Gary Wayne (Jon Hamm) for 15 years. Determined to be seen as something other than a victim and armed only with a positive attitude, Kimmy decides to restart her life by moving to New York City, where she quickly befriends her street-wise landlady Lillian Kaushtupper (Carol Kane), finds a roommate in struggling actor Titus Andromedon (Tituss Burgess), and gains a job as a nanny for the melancholy and out-of-touch socialite Jacqueline Voorhees (Jane Krakowski). With their help, Kimmy struggles to adapt to an unfamiliar world and jump-start the adult life that was taken away from her.

== Series overview ==
| Season | Episodes | | Originally released |
|---|---|---|---|
| 1 | 13 | | March 6, 2015 |
| 2 | 13 | | April 15, 2016 |
| 3 | 13 | | May 19, 2017 |
| 4 | 12 | 6 | May 30, 2018 |
| 4 | 12 | 6 | January 25, 2019 |
| Special | | | May 12, 2020 |

== Episodes ==
=== Season 1 (2015) ===
| No. overall | No. in season | Title | Directed by | Written by | Original release date |
|---|---|---|---|---|---|
| 1 | 1 | "Kimmy Goes Outside!" | Tristram Shapeero | Tina Fey & Robert Carlock | March 6, 2015 |
Kimmy Schmidt (Ellie Kemper) has been held captive in an underground bunker in Indiana for the past 15 years by a Reverend who told her and three other women that the Earth was destroyed in an apocalypse. The women are rescued and are dubbed 'The Mole Women' by the press. The Women travel to New York City to be interviewed by Matt Lauer. Unwilling to be viewed as a victim, Kimmy decides that she wants to stay in New York City and rebuild her life. She is given $13,000 in cash from the "mole fund" and begins to explore the city. On her first day in the city, she looks for a roommate, which she finds in broke aspiring actor/singer Titus Andromedon (Tituss Burgess), who tells her that she must get a job first to pay the back-rent he owes his street-wise landlady Lillian (Carol Kane). Kimmy gets a new job when she mistakes wealthy socialite Jacqueline Voorhees (Jane Krakowski) for being a captive in her luxurious home, and is hired as her son Buckley's new nanny. Titus and Kimmy go to a nightclub to celebrate, but Kimmy's cash is stolen. The following morning, she shows up for her first day two hours late and is fired. After finding that she has nothing left and being told to return to Indiana by Titus, she remembers how she survived with the Reverend for fifteen years and decides to stay in New York City to rebuild her life and help Titus achieve his dreams of stardom.
| 2 | 2 | "Kimmy Gets a Job!" | Tristram Shapeero | Sam Means | March 6, 2015 |
Kimmy attempts to get her job back from Mrs. Voorhees and, to prove her worth, is tasked with throwing a perfect birthday party for Mrs. Voorhees' son and grounding her step-daughter, Xanthippe (Dylan Gelula), who seems to run the house. Mrs. Voorhees is devastated after she finds that her husband isn't coming to her son's birthday party, confiding in Kimmy that she believes he is cheating on her and that their marriage is falling apart. Kimmy blackmails Xanthippe and is able to ground her for drinking alcohol, but arouses Xan's suspicions that she might be hiding something. Mrs. Voorhees tries to fire Kimmy but after she finds that Kimmy has done everything she tasked her with she proclaims that Kimmy is her best friend and rehires her. Meanwhile, Titus works to get his security deposit back from his costume rental after Kimmy tells him to quit his job as a Time Square costumed character to pursue his dream. Note: Due to her performance, Jane Krakowski was nominated for the Primetime Emmy Award for Outstanding Supporting Actress in a Comedy Series for "Kimmy Gets a Job!"
| 3 | 3 | "Kimmy Goes on a Date!" | Beth McCarthy-Miller | Jack Burditt & Robert Carlock | March 6, 2015 |
Kimmy, suffering from nightmares of the bunker, believes that she needs someone to talk to, which prompts Jacqueline to set her up with a rich elderly man (John McMartin) who has dementia - prompting jealousy from Buckley's tutor Charles (Andy Ridings). After being asked about her heritage, Jacqueline reflects on her family, revealing that she is a Lakota Sioux woman from South Dakota who is pretending to be white. Jacqueline stands up for Kimmy when Xanthippe sets out to find out everything about her and Charles tries to ask Kimmy out. Titus tries to hide his money from Lillian - which is for new head shots so he can make it on Broadway - resulting in him going to a funeral of an elderly Korean man. When he comes clean about what the money is for, a man snatches it from him in the street.
| 4 | 4 | "Kimmy Goes to the Doctor!" | Tristram Shapeero | Jack Burditt & Tina Fey | March 6, 2015 |
Kimmy receives an unwanted call from fellow Mole Woman, Cyndee Pokorny (Sara Chase), after Titus sends her a letter - pretending to be her - because he believes that she needs to talk to someone about her life in the bunker. Jacqueline is devastated when her husband that he will not be back for an additional six weeks. She asks Kimmy to accompany her to her Plastic Surgeon, Dr. Sydney Grant (Martin Short), who tempts Kimmy to get work done to address her "scream lines". Meanwhile, Titus auditions for a spot in the Broadway production "Spider-Man Too: 2 Many Spider-Men" after numerous spots are opened due to injured actors, but is discouraged after encountering his more successful rival Coriolanus Burt (James Monroe Iglehart). Kimmy helps Titus get a new agent, but flees his office when the agent recognizes her as one of the Mole Women. She asks Dr. Grant to give her a new face, but realizes in the chair that this would cover up rather than solve her problems. Later, she also explains to Jacqueline that she needs to accept herself for who she is and not focus so much on her looks. Titus' audition for Spider-Man Too is unsuccessful, but he is cheered when he discovers that Coriolanus is also auditioning for the same humiliating part. Kimmy, realizing that she can't bury her past, invites Cyndee to come visit her in New York.
| 5 | 5 | "Kimmy Kisses a Boy!" | Linda Mendoza | Allison Silverman | March 6, 2015 |
Charles and Kimmy kiss for the first time after sharing a workplace flirtation. Cyndee arrives with her boyfriend Brandon, who had also been her former middle school crush. Titus immediately suspects that Brandon is gay, but Kimmy disagrees. After Kimmy realizes how many free things Cyndee has been getting due to the sympathy of others, she tricks Brandon into revealing that he is gay, but he says that he's only with Cyndee because he too feels sorry for her. Shortly after, Brandon proposes to Cyndee, prompting Kimmy to tell Cyndee the truth, though Cyndee reveals she already knows and does not care. After a misunderstanding when speaking to Charles on the phone, Kimmy tells him that she loves him, awkwardly ending their relationship before it can start. She then realizes that she hadn't been working on the goals she set out when in the bunker and was jealous of all Cyndee had done, leading her to enroll in a GED program. Meanwhile, Titus has a crisis regarding his age and if he is still found attractive, but is cheered when he is asked out by a newly-out-of-the-closet construction worker (Mike Carlsen).
| 6 | 6 | "Kimmy Goes to School!" | Michael Engler | Dan Rubin & Lon Zimmet | March 6, 2015 |
Kimmy enrolls into an adult GED class in an attempt to pass the eighth grade but is discouraged when she learns her teacher (Richard Kind) could not care less for her education, and would much rather fail his way until he is placed on a paid probation. Kimmy, who is vehemently against this, enlists her classmates – including a Vietnamese immigrant named Dong Nguyen (Ki Hong Lee) – to study for their GED together. Meanwhile, Lillian helps Titus make a music video in Jacqueline's empty house, but Titus is forced to pretend to be a repairman and help Xan clean the house after she secretly throws a party. Note: Due to his performance, Tituss Burgess was nominated for a Primetime Emmy Award for Outstanding Supporting Actor in a Comedy Series for "Kimmy Goes to School!"
| 7 | 7 | "Kimmy Goes to a Party!" | Nicole Holofcener | Robert Carlock | March 6, 2015 |
Jacqueline's husband Julian (Mark Harelik) finally makes it home and is throwing a surprise cocktail party, which Jacqueline believes she can use to prove his infidelity after catching him communicating with someone named Yuko. Jacqueline invites Kimmy as a guest/accomplice and Kimmy invites Titus to sing at the party. While at the party, Kimmy flirts with wealthy businessman Logan Beekman (Adam Campbell), who mistakes her for a guest, and Titus seeks to impress a guest he believes is a Broadway producer. Jacqueline is shocked to discover that Yuko is actually a Japanese Robot that Julian introduces to investors at the party, and Titus is furious to be upstaged by the robot. Xan maliciously reveals to Logan that Kimmy is an employee, not a guest, and she leaves the party humiliated, and Jacqueline and Titus end up trying to bury Yuko "alive". Titus accidentally attacks the broadway producer, but the producer reveals he actually manages a horror-musical theme restaurant on Broadway and hires Titus as a singing werewolf/waiter. Logan, realizing that Kimmy had no idea how wealthy his family is, asks her out the day after the party, and Jacqueline realizes that Julian is sleeping with their couples' therapist, proving her suspicions correct.
| 8 | 8 | "Kimmy Is Bad at Math!" | Michael Engler | Meredith Scardino | March 6, 2015 |
Jacqueline learns she will receive only 12 million dollars if she divorces her billionaire husband, and her resolve to end her marriage weakens. Realizing just how poor her math skills are, Kimmy seeks out classmate Dong to help her with math, which he agrees to in exchange for some help at his delivery job. The two quickly bond, but Dong's pay being cut after Kimmy gives customers too much change back and they argue. When Jacqueline announces she will stay with Julian, Kimmy is able to apply the math Dong taught her to prove to Jacqueline she will be able to grow the money in her settlement if she invests it wisely, finally confessing her past as a Mole Woman and encouraging her to start over. Kimmy apologizes to Dong, and he realizes she has helped him improve his English. Kimmy goes on a date with Logan, which is witnessed by a heartbroken Dong. Meanwhile, Titus starts his new job as a werewolf at a horror-themed restaurant on Broadway and finds that life as a werewolf is easier than that of a black man.
| 9 | 9 | "Kimmy Has a Birthday!" | Todd Holland | Jack Burditt | March 6, 2015 |
Kimmy throws a party for her 30th birthday, but is unpleasantly surprised when her incompetent state trooper step-father Randy (Tim Blake Nelson) and half-sister Kymmi (Kiernan Shipka) show up uninvited. At the party, Kymmi lashes out at Kimmy after Randy gives her a locket that belongs to Kimmy and Kymmi's absentee mother. Meanwhile, Logan and Dong compete for Kimmy's attention at the party, culminating in a fight and Titus invites an attractive coworker to the party without seeing his face, only to realize that the coworker is someone he has previously dated. At the height of the chaos, Kimmy kicks everyone out for ruining her birthday, and discovers that Kymmi has run away. Kimmy tracks her down to an Olive Garden in Times Square and manages to reconcile with her sister, commiserating with her on how hard it is when you don't get a childhood.
| 10 | 10 | "Kimmy's in a Love Triangle!" | Jeff Richmond | Azie Dungey & Lauren Gurganous | March 6, 2015 |
A jealous Logan asks Kimmy to break off her friendship with Dong. When she goes to do so, she discovers that Dong's workplace has been raided by Immigration Authorities, and allow him to stay at her apartment. Xan's mother (Christine Ebersole) plans to move her to Connecticut in the wake of the Voorhees' divorce, and Xan desperately enlists Kimmy's help to stay with her toxic friend group in Manhattan. Meanwhile, Titus is overlooked for a new role at the restaurant because he can't "play straight", and seeks out help from "straight coach" M. La Loup (Dean Norris). Xan, Titus, Dong and Kimmy disguise Kimmy's apartment as a drug den where Xan is living with a pimp (Dong), but as part of the charade, Kimmy and Dong are forced to kiss. Realizing that Xan would thrive in Connecticut, Kimmy confesses the deception to Xan's mother and reveals Xan's nerdy interests to her friends. Logan lets it slip that he called Immigration on Dong, and Kimmy angrily breaks up with him. She confesses her feelings for Dong, but is shocked with he suggests that they get married so he does not get deported.
| 11 | 11 | "Kimmy Rides a Bike!" | Beth McCarthy-Miller | Sam Means & Allison Silverman | March 6, 2015 |
Kimmy is summoned to testify against the man who abducted her, Reverend Richard Wayne Gary Wayne (Jon Hamm) but refuses to face her past. Titus goes to the local library to watch the trial unfold online, discovering that the prosecuting attorneys Marcia and Chris (Tina Fey and Jerry Minor) aren't doing very well and the charismatic Reverend, painting himself as a religious man who was trying to save innocent women from the apocalypse, quickly wins the courtroom to his side. Kimmy and Jacqueline begin regularly attending a lifestyle/spinning class instructed by the mystical coach Tristafé (Nick Kroll) to escape their problems – Kimmy to avoid the guilt of not returning to testify and Jacqueline to cope with her divorce. Kimmy quickly rises through the ranks of the class and refuses to engage with the stress of the trial, but notices similarities between Tristafé's spin class and a cult. She exposes Tristafé's scheme to the other women and returns to Indiana with Titus to testify.
| 12 | 12 | "Kimmy Goes to Court!" | Ken Whittingham | Emily Altman & Jack Burditt | March 6, 2015 |
Kimmy returns to Indiana to testify against Reverend Richard Wayne Gary Wayne and to serve as Cyndee's maid of honor. Her testimony goes badly as the Reverend twists her words against her and paints her as un-American. Cyndee, betrayed to learn that Kimmy was manipulated into passing up an opportunity to let Cyndee out of the bunker, disinvites Kimmy from her bachelorette party. Titus is interviewed on local news on Kimmy's behalf, but gains viral internet fame when he embarrasses himself on live tv. Kimmy convinces the Mole Women to return to the bunker to look for evidence against the Reverend, but find nothing except a tape of the Reverend promoting his DJ business and auditioning for The Apprentice. Note: For her performance, Tina Fey was nominated for the Primetime Emmy Award for Outstanding Guest Actress in a Comedy Series for "Kimmy Goes to Court!"
| 13 | 13 | "Kimmy Makes Waffles!" | Tristram Shapeero | Robert Carlock & Sam Means | March 6, 2015 |
The Mole Women become trapped in the bunker when Randy fails to properly guard the hatch door and begin to argue. Jacqueline and Lillian attempt to travel to Indiana to support Kimmy, but struggle to make it out of New York as neither of them drive. Eventually, Jacqueline uses knowledge from her Native American heritage to navigate them to Indiana. Meanwhile, the Mole Women make up and work together to escape the bunker themselves. The Mole Women head back to the trial and use the Reverend's audition tape to prove that he never believed the apocalypse was coming. The Reverend is convicted and Jacqueline decides to return to her home in South Dakota. Kimmy's victory is undercut when she calls Dong, who has had to marry their elderly GED classmate Sonya to avoid being deported. Titus' estranged wife finds him after seeing his YouTube video. Note: For his performance, Jon Hamm was nominated for the Primetime Emmy Award for Outstanding Guest Actor in a Comedy Series for "Kimmy Makes Waffles!"

=== Season 2 (2016) ===
| No. overall | No. in season | Title | Directed by | Written by | Original release date |
|---|---|---|---|---|---|
| 14 | 1 | "Kimmy Goes Roller Skating!" | Tristram Shapeero | Tina Fey | April 15, 2016 |
Titus' ex, Vonda, sues him. Kimmy decides to go after Dong even though he's married. Jacqueline overstays her welcome with her Native American parents. Lillian begins dating Robert Durst (Fred Armisen).
| 15 | 2 | "Kimmy Goes on a Playdate!" | Jeff Richmond | Robert Carlock | April 15, 2016 |
Jacqueline returns to Manhattan and has Kimmy help her get her back on track. When giving away his old clothes, Titus makes a connection with the construction worker he talked to the previous year.
| 16 | 3 | "Kimmy Goes to a Play!" | Linda Mendoza | Sam Means | April 15, 2016 |
Titus puts on a one-man show about one of his past lives. Jacqueline attempts to make her ex-husband jealous. Lillian fights the gentrification of her neighborhood.
| 17 | 4 | "Kimmy Kidnaps Gretchen!" | Robert Carlock | Allison Silverman | April 15, 2016 |
Kimmy attempts to save Gretchen from joining another cult. Titus goes on a date with Mikey.
| 18 | 5 | "Kimmy Gives Up!" | Ken Whittingham | Josh Siegal & Dylan Morgan | April 15, 2016 |
Kimmy gets distracted from her GED by preventing Dong from getting deported. Jacqueline medicates her hyperactive son, Buckley. Titus decides to teach Lillian some forgotten showtunes. Note: Due to his performance, Tituss Burgess was nominated for consideration for the Primetime Emmy Award for Outstanding Supporting Actor in a Comedy Series for "Kimmy Gives Up!"
| 19 | 6 | "Kimmy Drives a Car!" | Shawn Levy | Dan Rubin | April 15, 2016 |
Titus rents his apartment on Airbnb to a couple of hipsters from Austin (Zosia Mamet and Evan Jonigkeit). Kimmy puts her foot down on her relationship with Jacqueline.
| 20 | 7 | "Kimmy Walks Into a Bar!" | Maggie Carey | Leila Starchan | April 15, 2016 |
Jacqueline throws a gala the same night that her frenemy, Deirdre Robespierre (Anna Camp), throws a party. Kimmy has a brief relationship with an Army vet (Samuel Page) she met in a bar where she used the bathroom.
| 21 | 8 | "Kimmy Goes to a Hotel!" | Steve Buscemi | Tina Fey & Sam Means | April 15, 2016 |
Kimmy and the gang celebrate Fake Christmas. Kimmy takes Dong to an abandoned hotel in the Poconos. A Jewish family claims the rights to the painting Jacqueline bid on. Note: Due to her performance, Ellie Kemper was nominated for the Primetime Emmy Award for Outstanding Lead Actress in a Comedy Series for "Kimmy Goes to a Hotel!"
| 22 | 9 | "Kimmy Meets a Drunk Lady!" | Claire Scanlon | Meredith Scardino | April 15, 2016 |
On her Uber run, Kimmy meets a drunk therapist named Andrea (series co-creator Tina Fey) whom she begins to open up to. Meanwhile, Titus decides to build his own tape tower.
| 23 | 10 | "Kimmy Goes to Her Happy Place!" | John Riggi | Emily Altman & Robert Carlock | April 15, 2016 |
Kimmy begins therapy with Andrea. Titus helps Mikey come out to his family.
| 24 | 11 | "Kimmy Meets a Celebrity!" | Tristram Shapeero | Josh Siegal & Dylan Morgan | April 15, 2016 |
Cyndee comes back to New York where Kimmy finds out she has been seeing a celebrity television therapist (Jeff Goldblum). Titus mentors a teenage boy and contemplates having a family of his own. Lillian handcuffs herself to a bulldozer to prevent gentrification.
| 25 | 12 | "Kimmy Sees a Sunset!" | Beth McCarthy-Miller | Azie Dungey & Dan Rubin | April 15, 2016 |
Kimmy attempts to help Andrea stop drinking, but to no avail. Jacqueline decides to pursue Russ, the lawyer who took away her painting. Titus and Mikey move in together.
| 26 | 13 | "Kimmy Finds Her Mom!" | Michael Engler | Tina Fey & Sam Means | April 15, 2016 |
Kimmy reunites with her long-lost mother (Lisa Kudrow) at Universal Studios Florida at Universal Orlando. Titus heads to Miami, but makes a detour at Titusville, Florida, taking it as a sign. Jacqueline invites Russ' family for Thanksgiving, but finds out they are the same Snyder family who own the controversial Washington Redskins.

=== Season 3 (2017) ===
| No. overall | No. in season | Title | Directed by | Written by | Original release date |
|---|---|---|---|---|---|
| 27 | 1 | "Kimmy Gets Divorced?!" | Tristram Shapeero | Robert Carlock & Meredith Scardino | May 19, 2017 |
After finally receiving her G.E.D., Kimmy also receives the divorce papers from the Reverend, but Jacqueline suggests she hold out on him to give him the same torture he gave her. Meanwhile, after leaving the cruise, Titus auditions for Sesame Street. When he seeks out his boyfriend, Mikey, after not seeing him for months, he finds an unpleasant surprise.
| 28 | 2 | "Kimmy's Roommate Lemonades!" | Tristram Shapeero | Tina Fey & Sam Means | May 19, 2017 |
After seeing Mikey with another man, Titus channels Beyoncé's epic Lemonade album to work through their relationship issues. Meanwhile, Kimmy takes a tour of potential colleges and ponders what career path she should take. Lillian and Jacqueline compete in an election for city council. Note: Due to his performance, Tituss Burgess was nominated for the Primetime Emmy Award for Outstanding Supporting Actor in a Comedy Series "Kimmy's Roommate Lemonades!"
| 29 | 3 | "Kimmy Can't Help You!" | Don Scardino | Allison Silverman | May 19, 2017 |
The Reverend's fiancée (Laura Dern) visits Kimmy to try to get her to sign the divorce papers. Jacqueline and Russ concoct a plan to convince Russ' father to rename the Washington Redskins.
| 30 | 4 | "Kimmy Goes to College!" | Gail Mancuso | Dan Rubin | May 19, 2017 |
Kimmy gets a for-hire job on a popular app and ends up getting offered a scholarship to Columbia University, where Xan happens to be attending. Meanwhile, Titus gets a job singing backup for a conspiracy theorist singer (Judah Friedlander) and Lillian filibusters a council meeting. Note: Due to her performance, Ellie Kemper was nominated for the Primetime Emmy Award for Outstanding Lead Actress in a Comedy Series for "Kimmy Goes to College!"
| 31 | 5 | "Kimmy Steps on a Crack!" | Jeff Richmond | Leila Strachan | May 19, 2017 |
The FBI takes Kimmy to negotiate with Gretchen, who has started her own cult. With Kimmy gone, Lillian tries to take care of Titus when he comes down with scurvy. Jacqueline finds herself in a tough situation with Russ' brother, Duke (Josh Charles). The episode features a crossover with Netflix's Orange Is the New Black.
| 32 | 6 | "Kimmy is a Feminist!" | Don Scardino | Grace Edwards & Sam Means | May 19, 2017 |
Kimmy goes to her first college party and finds she has a lot to learn about college life. Her blossoming relationship with fellow student Perry (Daveed Diggs) hits a bump. Jacqueline enlists Titus' and Lillian's help to trick Russ' brother.
| 33 | 7 | "Kimmy Learns About the Weather!" | Claire Scanlon | Lauren Gurganous & Meredith Scardino | May 19, 2017 |
With Hurricane Tammi (with an I) threatening New York, Kimmy sets out to convince the city to stay calm. Titus realizes a TV commercial is stealing his characteristics and voice so he decides to confront them. Artie (Peter Riegert) gets Lillian to confront her fear of change.
| 34 | 8 | "Kimmy Does a Puzzle!" | Beth McCarthy-Miller | Tina Fey | May 19, 2017 |
When Titus finally reveals the entire story about what happened on the cruise ship with Dionne Warwick (Maya Rudolph), Kimmy ponders whether she should end her friendship with him.
| 35 | 9 | "Kimmy Goes to Church!" | Jaffar Mahmood | Azie Dungey & Max Werner | May 19, 2017 |
Kimmy is ready to apologize to Perry but needs to learn what religion really is first. Titus joins the church choir as an act of humanitarianism and becomes interested in the choir director, Reuben (Michael Benjamin Washington). Lillian and Jacqueline give each other makeovers.
| 36 | 10 | "Kimmy Pulls Off a Heist!" | Claire Scanlon | Nick Bernardone & Bridger Winegar | May 19, 2017 |
Jacqueline uses the footage on her iPad to try and change the name of the Washington Redskins while Titus and Kimmy have a plan to distract the gas station owner (Ray Liotta) in order to use his toilet.
| 37 | 11 | "Kimmy Googles the Internet!" | Michael Engler | Dan Rubin & Leila Strachan | May 19, 2017 |
Kimmy and Perry attend a dinner party hosted by her Professor (Rachel Dratch). Meanwhile, Titus meets Reuben's one year old daughter, Linda, and Jacqueline has to prepare for Russ' return home from the hospital.
| 38 | 12 | "Kimmy and the Trolley Problem!" | Robert Carlock | Sam Means | May 19, 2017 |
Kimmy is a guest on Xan's new campus TV show where she promised to talk about her experience; although frightened to talk about it, she calls Cyndee for help. Jacqueline and Russ are given the opportunity to appear on the Real Housewives while Lillian is getting to grips with technology after Artie plans to take her to Europe.
| 39 | 13 | "Kimmy Bites an Onion!" | Ken Whittingham | Meredith Scardino & Allison Silverman | May 19, 2017 |
Kimmy must get a 100% on her next exam or she will fail out of Columbia University. Titus realizes that his TaskRabbit song "Boobs in California" has become a viral hit. Jacqueline looks for a new job after her break-up with Russ. Lillian tries to convince Artie to buy a new heart. Kimmy tries to become a crossing guard and gets a perfect score. However, because of her marriage to the Reverend, a registered sex offender, she is immediately rejected. With Jacqueline's help, Titus gets his residuals and tries to use them to get back together with his ex-boyfriend, Mikey. During a performance, Titus admits that he will win Mikey back from his new boyfriend. Jacqueline decides to become an agent. Despite Lillian's own failings to convince Artie to buy a new heart, she helps Kimmy get together with another former student, Zach (Noah Robbins), who wants Kimmy to work with him at his new startup tech company.

=== Season 4 (2018–19) ===
| No. overall | No. in season | Title | Directed by | Written by | Original release date |
|---|---|---|---|---|---|
Part 1
| 40 | 1 | "Kimmy Is... Little Girl, Big City!" | Tristram Shapeero | Sam Means | May 30, 2018 |
Kimmy starts her new job at Giztoob, but immediately gets suspended for a sexual harassment complaint. Meanwhile, Jacqueline has difficulty getting work for Titus, and Lillian attempts to spread Artie's ashes.
| 41 | 2 | "Kimmy Has a Weekend!" | Tristram Shapeero | Dan Rubin | May 30, 2018 |
Kimmy spends her weekend with Titus getting her nails done, getting brunch, and binging on TV series. Meanwhile, Jacqueline and Lillian attempt to get back the former's apartment, which is being sublet.
| 42 | 3 | "Party Monster: Scratching the Surface" | Rhys Thomas | Meredith Scardino | May 30, 2018 |
An unconventional episode done in the style of a true crime documentary. Doug "DJ Fingablast" (Derek Klena) attempts to get his idol "DJ Slizzard" (the DJ name of Richard Wayne Gary Wayne) to DJ his wedding. Note: This is also featured on Netflix as a separate special.
| 43 | 4 | "Kimmy Disrupts the Paradigm!" | Claire Cowperthwaite | Leila Strachan | May 30, 2018 |
Kimmy is assigned to go to an algorithmic convention in Pittsburgh, with Lillian tagging along. Meanwhile, Jacqueline gets Titus a role in a touring school play.
| 44 | 5 | "Kimmy and the Beest!" | Claire Scanlon | Robert Carlock | May 30, 2018 |
Titus becomes the director of a school play. Jacqueline and Lillian attempt to sell out the play. Kimmy confronts Fran Dodd (Bobby Moynihan), one of the subjects of the scathing documentary that painted her in a bad light.
| 45 | 6 | "Kimmy Meets an Old Friend!" | Jude Weng | Nick Bernardone & Tina Fey | May 30, 2018 |
Kimmy is finally reunited with the backpack she lost in "Kimmy Goes Outside!". Xan tells Jacqueline some shocking news. Titus attempts to pitch his new TV series. Lillian attends Artie's memorial and meets Artie's two adult children.
Part 2
| 46 | 7 | "Kimmy Fights a Fire Monster!" | Jaffar Mahmood | Lauren Gurganous & Sam Means | January 25, 2019 |
Kimmy crosses paths with Donna Maria, now a successful businesswoman, but she rebuffs Kimmy's efforts to rekindle their friendship. Titus believes he is being hit on by an attractive man (Jon Bernthal) due to his newfound stardom, only to learn that his "fan" has an ulterior motive. Jacqueline, Lillian, and Mimi decide to pursue millennial men.
| 47 | 8 | "Kimmy Is in a Love Square!" | Jeff Richmond | Dan Rubin & Matt Whitaker | January 25, 2019 |
Kimmy goes on a date with her coworker Josh (Dan Byrd), though she ends up preferring the company of his parents. Titus contemplates coming forward with his experience of sexual harassment while auditioning for Sesame Street the previous year.
| 48 | 9 | "Sliding Van Doors" | Michael Engler | Robert Carlock & Sam Means | January 25, 2019 |
| 48 | 9 | "Sliding Van Doors" | Michael Engler | Azie Dungey & Sam Means | January 25, 2019 |
Inspired by the plot of the 1998 film Sliding Doors, the episode presents an alternate universe depicting how the main characters' lives would have turned out if Kimmy had never gotten into the Reverend's van and Titus had missed his audition for The Lion King. Note: This is the only one-hour episode, thus no 13th one this season.
| 49 | 10 | "Kimmy Finds a Liar!" | Maggie Carey | Grace Edwards & Leila Strachan | January 25, 2019 |
Kimmy confronts Fran Dodd for posing as the author of her handmade children's book in order to impress his new girlfriend. Jacqueline hires Titus to be in a fake gay relationship with a heterosexual television host (Rob Huebel). Lillian teaches Artie's daughter Sheba (Busy Philipps) a lesson in taking responsibility for one's actions.
| 50 | 11 | "Kimmy Is Rich*!" | Todd Holland | Meredith Scardino & Evan Waite | January 25, 2019 |
Kimmy faces a moral dilemma when Zach sells Giztoob for millions of dollars. Jacqueline is determined to keep Tripp (Paul Walter Hauser) as a client, after he is poached by a rival agent, Eli Rubin (Zachary Quinto). Titus discovers a secret about Cats.
| 51 | 12 | "Kimmy Says Bye!" | Beth McCarthy-Miller | Robert Carlock & Tina Fey | January 25, 2019 |
Kimmy, Titus, and Lillian find themselves homeless after their apartment building has been marked by the city for demolition. Kimmy tries to come up with the money to stop the demolition. Titus must choose between his dream role in The Lion King and winning back Mikey. Lillian plans a final stand against the gentrification of the neighborhood. Jacqueline gets constantly undermined by Eli, until they form an unlikely bond.

=== Special (2020) ===
| No. overall | No. in season | Title | Directed by | Written by | Original release date |
|---|---|---|---|---|---|
| 52 | 1 | Unbreakable Kimmy Schmidt: Kimmy vs the Reverend | Claire Scanlon | Robert Carlock & Tina Fey & Sam Means & Meredith Scardino | May 12, 2020 |
Three days before her wedding to Prince Frederick (guest star Daniel Radcliffe), Kimmy discovers a book tucked inside Jan S. Port that had been checked out of a junior high school library six years after she was kidnapped. She confronts Reverend Wayne, who reveals the existence of a second bunker in West Virginia. Kimmy and Titus set out to free the women. Titus has a movie to shoot, so Jacqueline attempts to stall and cover for him until he gets to set. Lillian persuades Frederick to learn some life lessons before he ties the knot.
