= Satellite Award for Best Actress – Musical or Comedy =

Satellite Award for Best Actress - Musical or Comedy can refer to:

- Satellite Award for Best Actress – Motion Picture Musical or Comedy or
- Satellite Award for Best Actress – Television Series Musical or Comedy
