= Satellite Award for Best Actress – Television Series Musical or Comedy =

Annual television award

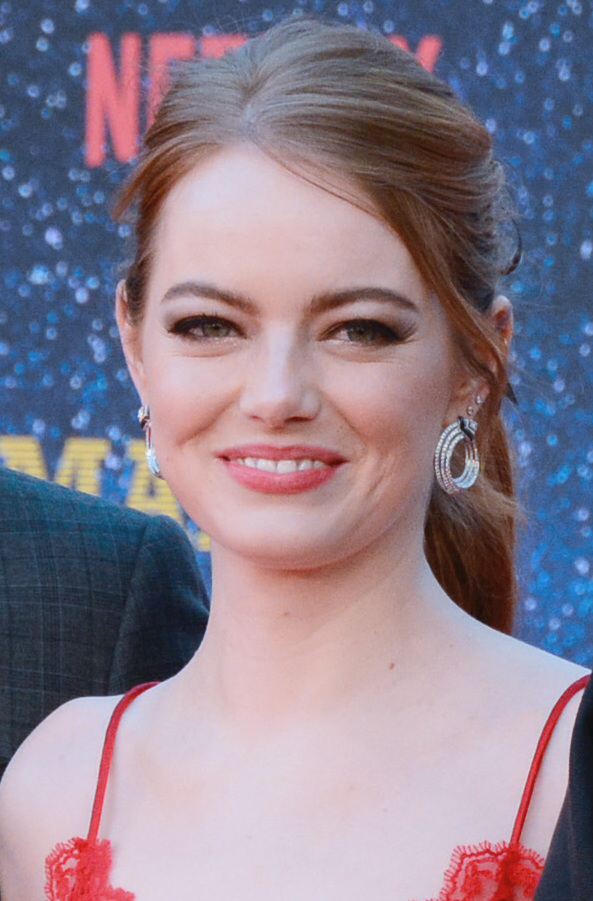
- The 2024 recipient: Emma Stone
- Awarded for: Best Actress in a Musical or Comedy Series
- Country: United States
- Presented by: International Press Academy
- First award: 1996
- Currently held by: Emma Stone – The Curse (2024)

The Satellite Award for Best Actress in a Television Series – Musical or Comedy is one of the annual Satellite Awards given by the International Press Academy.

== Winners and nominees ==
indicates the winner

=== 1990s ===
Year	Actor	Series	Role	Network
1996	Jane Curtin	3rd Rock from the Sun	Mary Albright	NBC
1996	Fran Drescher	The Nanny	Fran Fine	CBS
1996	Cybill Shepherd	Cybill	Cybill Sheridan	CBS
1996	Helen Hunt	Mad About You	Jamie Stemple Buchman	NBC
1996	Lea Thompson	Caroline in the City	Caroline Duffy	NBC
1997	Tracey Ullman	Tracey Takes On...	Various characters	HBO
1997	Ellen DeGeneres	Ellen	Ellen Morgan	ABC
1997	Jane Curtin	3rd Rock from the Sun	Mary Albright	NBC
1997	Helen Hunt	Mad About You	Jamie Stemple Buchman	NBC
1997	Brooke Shields	Suddenly Susan	Susan Keane	NBC
1998	Ellen DeGeneres	Ellen	Ellen Morgan	ABC
1998	Calista Flockhart	Ally McBeal	Ally McBeal	Fox
1998	Helen Hunt	Mad About You	Jamie Stemple Buchman	NBC
1998	Brooke Shields	Suddenly Susan	Susan Keane	NBC
1998	Phylicia Rashad	Cosby	Ruth Lucas	CBS
1999	Illeana Douglas	Action	Wendy Ward	Fox
1999	Jennifer Aniston	Friends	Rachel Green	NBC
1999	Jane Leeves	Frasier	Daphne Moon	NBC
1999	Jenna Elfman	Dharma & Greg	Dharma Montgomery	ABC
1999	Calista Flockhart	Ally McBeal	Ally McBeal	Fox

=== 2000s ===
Year	Actor	Series	Role	Network
2000	Lisa Kudrow	Friends	Phoebe Buffay	NBC
2000	Jenna Elfman	Dharma & Greg	Dharma Montgomery	ABC
2000	Wendie Malick	Just Shoot Me!	Nina Van Horn	NBC
2000	Laura San Giacomo	Just Shoot Me!	Maya Gallo	NBC
2000	Jane Krakowski	Ally McBeal	Elaine Vassal	Fox
2001	Debra Messing	Will & Grace	Grace Adler	NBC
2001	Jenna Elfman	Dharma & Greg	Dharma Montgomery	ABC
2001	Lisa Kudrow	Friends	Phoebe Buffay	NBC
2001	Lauren Graham	Gilmore Girls	Lorelai Gilmore	The CW
2001	Jane Kaczmarek	Malcolm in the Middle	Lois	Fox
2002	Debra Messing	Will & Grace	Grace Adler	NBC
2002	Alexis Bledel	Gilmore Girls	Rory Gilmore	The CW
2002	Lauren Graham	Gilmore Girls	Lorelai Gilmore	The CW
2002	Jennifer Aniston	Friends	Rachel Green	NBC
2002	Bonnie Hunt	Life with Bonnie	Bonnie Molloy	ABC
2003	Jane Kaczmarek	Malcolm in the Middle	Lois	Fox
2003	Lauren Graham	Gilmore Girls	Lorelai Gilmore	The CW
2003	Bonnie Hunt	Life with Bonnie	Bonnie Molloy	ABC
2003	Wanda Sykes	Wanda at Large	Wanda Mildred Hawkins	Fox
2003	Debra Messing	Will & Grace	Grace Adler	NBC
2003	Alicia Silverstone	Miss Match	Kate Fox	NBC
2004	Portia de Rossi	Arrested Development	Lindsay Bluth Fünke	Fox
2004	Marcia Cross	Desperate Housewives	Bree Van de Kamp	ABC
2004	Teri Hatcher	Desperate Housewives	Susan Mayer	ABC
2004	Felicity Huffman	Desperate Housewives	Lynette Scavo	ABC
2004	Lauren Graham	Gilmore Girls	Lorelai Gilmore	The CW
2004	Maya Rudolph	Saturday Night Live	Various characters	NBC
2005	Felicity Huffman	Desperate Housewives	Lynette Scavo	ABC
2005	Mary-Louise Parker	Weeds	Nancy Botwin	Showtime
2005	Candice Bergen	Boston Legal	Shirley Schmidt	ABC
2005	Lauren Graham	Gilmore Girls	Lorelai Gilmore	The CW
2005	Elizabeth Perkins	Weeds	Celia Hodes	Showtime
2006	Marcia Cross	Desperate Housewives	Bree Van de Kamp	ABC
2006	Laura Kightlinger	The Minor Accomplishments of Jackie Woodman	Jackie Woodman	IFC
2006	Lisa Kudrow	The Comeback	Valerie Cherish	HBO
2006	America Ferrera	Ugly Betty	Betty Suarez	ABC
2006	Julia Louis-Dreyfus	The New Adventures of Old Christine	Christine Campbell	CBS
2006	Mary-Louise Parker	Weeds	Nancy Botwin	Showtime
2007	America Ferrera	Ugly Betty	Betty Suarez	ABC
2007	Tina Fey	30 Rock	Liz Lemon	NBC
2007	Felicity Huffman	Desperate Housewives	Lynette Scavo	ABC
2007	Anna Friel	Pushing Daisies	Charlotte Charles	ABC
2007	Patricia Heaton	Back to You	Kelly Carr	Fox
2007	Julia Louis-Dreyfus	The New Adventures of Old Christine	Christine Campbell	CBS
2008	Tracey Ullman	State of the Union	Various characters	Showtime
2008	America Ferrera	Ugly Betty	Betty Suarez	ABC
2008	Christina Applegate	Samantha Who?	Samantha Newly	ABC
2008	Tina Fey	30 Rock	Liz Lemon	NBC
2008	Julia Louis-Dreyfus	The New Adventures of Old Christine	Christine Campbell	CBS
2008	Mary-Louise Parker	Weeds	Nancy Botwin	Showtime
2009	Lea Michele	Glee	Rachel Berry	Fox
2009	Julie Bowen	Modern Family	Claire Dunphy	ABC
2009	Toni Collette	United States of Tara	Tara Gregson/T/Buck/Alice	Showtime
2009	Edie Falco	Nurse Jackie	Jackie Payton, RN	Showtime
2009	Brooke Elliott	Drop Dead Diva	Jane Bingum/Deb Dobson	Lifetime
2009	Tina Fey	30 Rock	Liz Lemon	NBC
2009	Mary-Louise Parker	Weeds	Nancy Botw	Showtime

=== 2010s ===
Year	Actor	Series	Role	Network
2010	Laura Linney	The Big C	Cathy Jamison	Showtime
2010	Jane Adams	Hung	Tanya Skagle	HBO
2010	Toni Collette	United States of Tara	Tara Gregson/T/Buck/Alice/Shoshana Schoenbaum/Chicken	Showtime
2010	Mary-Louise Parker	Weeds	Nancy Botwin	Showtime
2010	Edie Falco	Nurse Jackie	Jackie Payton, RN	Showtime
2010	Tina Fey	30 Rock	Liz Lemon	NBC
2010	Lea Michele	Glee	Rachel Berry	Fox
2011	Martha Plimpton	Raising Hope	Virginia Chance	Fox
2011	Felicity Huffman	Desperate Housewives	Lynette Scavo	ABC
2011	Laura Linney	The Big C	Cathy Jamison	Showtime
2011	Zooey Deschanel	New Girl	Jessica Day	Fox
2011	Melissa McCarthy	Mike and Molly	Molly Flynn	CBS
2011	Amy Poehler	Parks and Recreation	Leslie Knope	NBC
2012	Kaley Cuoco	The Big Bang Theory	Penny	CBS
2012	Amy Poehler	Parks and Recreation	Leslie Knope	NBC
2012	Christina Applegate	Up All Night	Reagan Brinkley	NBC
2012	Laura Dern	Enlightened	Amy Jellicoe	HBO
2012	Lena Dunham	Girls	Hannah Horvath	HBO
2012	Julia Louis-Dreyfus	Veep	Selina Meyer	HBO
2013	Taylor Schilling	Orange Is the New Black	Piper Chapman	Netflix
2013	Laura Dern	Enlightened	Amy Jellicoe	HBO
2013	Lena Dunham	Girls	Hannah Horvath	HBO
2013	Julia Louis-Dreyfus	Veep	Selina Meyer	HBO
2013	Zooey Deschanel	New Girl	Jessica "Jess" Day	Fox
2013	Edie Falco	Nurse Jackie	Jackie Payton, RN	Showtime
2013	Amy Poehler	Parks and Recreation	Leslie Knope	NBC
2013	Jessica Walter	Arrested Development	Lucille Bluth	Netflix
2014	Mindy Kaling	The Mindy Project	Mindy Lahiri	Fox
2014	Edie Falco	Nurse Jackie	Jackie Payton, RN	Showtime
2014	Julia Louis-Dreyfus	Veep	Selina Meyer	HBO
2014	Taylor Schilling	Orange Is the New Black	Piper Chapman	Netflix
2014	Emmy Rossum	Shameless	Fiona Gallagher	Showtime
2014	Zooey Deschanel	New Girl	Jessica "Jess" Day	Fox
2015	Taylor Schilling	Orange Is the New Black	Piper Chapman	Netflix
2015	Jamie Lee Curtis	Scream Queens	Dean Cathy Munsch	Fox
2015	Julia Louis-Dreyfus	Veep	Selina Meyer	HBO
2015	Lily Tomlin	Grace and Frankie	Frankie Bergstein	Netflix
2015	Amy Poehler	Parks and Recreation	Leslie Knope	NBC
2015	Gina Rodriguez	Jane the Virgin	Jane Gloriana Villanueva	The CW
2016	Taylor Schilling	Orange Is the New Black	Piper Chapman	Netflix
2016	Pamela Adlon	Better Things	Sam Fox	FX
2016	Sharon Horgan	Catastrophe	Sharon Morris	Prime Video
2016	Ellie Kemper	Unbreakable Kimmy Schmidt	Kimmy Schmidt	HBO
2016	Tracee Ellis Ross	Black-ish	Dr. Rainbow "Bow" Johnson	ABC
2017	Niecy Nash	Claws	Desna Simms	TNT
2017	Alison Brie	GLOW	Ruth "Zoya the Destroya" Wilder	Netflix
2017	Ellie Kemper	Unbreakable Kimmy Schmidt	Kimmy Schmidt	Netflix
2017	Julia Louis-Dreyfus	Veep	President Selina Meyer	HBO
2017	Issa Rae	Insecure	Issa Dee	HBO
2017	Kathryn Hahn	I Love Dick	Chris Kraus	Prime Video
2018	Issa Rae	Insecure	Issa Dee	HBO
2018	Alison Brie	GLOW	Ruth "Zoya the Destroya" Wilder	Netflix
2018	Ellie Kemper	Unbreakable Kimmy Schmidt	Kimmy Schmidt	Netflix
2018	Christina Hendricks	Good Girls	Beth Boland	NBC
2018	Niecy Nash	Claws	Desna Simms	TNT
2018	Tracee Ellis Ross	Black-ish	Dr. Rainbow "Bow" Johnson	ABC
2019	Phoebe Waller-Bridge	Fleabag	Fleabag	Prime Video
2019	Pamela Adlon	Better Things	Sam Fox	FX
2019	Christina Applegate	Dead to Me	Jen Harding	Netflix
2019	Alison Brie	GLOW	Ruth "Zoya the Destroya" Wilder	Netflix
2019	Natasha Lyonne	Russian Doll	Nadia Vulvokov	Netflix
2019	Rachel Brosnahan	The Marvelous Mrs. Maisel	Miriam "Midge" Maisel	Prime Video
2019	Catherine O'Hara	Schitt's Creek	Moira Rose	Pop TV

=== 2020s ===
Year	Actor	Series	Role	Network
2020	Elle Fanning	The Great	Catherine the Great	Hulu
2020	Christina Applegate	Dead to Me	Jen Harding	Netflix
2020	Linda Cardellini	Dead to Me	Judy Hale	Netflix
2020	Zoe Kravitz	High Fidelity	Robyn "Rob" Brooks	Hulu
2020	Catherine O'Hara	Schitt's Creek	Moira Rose	Pop TV
2020	Issa Rae	Insecure	Issa Dee	HBO
2021	Jean Smart	Hacks	Deborah Vance	HBO Max
2021	Selena Gomez	Only Murders in the Building	Mabel Mora	Hulu
2021	Jennifer Jason Leigh	Atypical	Elsa Gardner	Netflix
2021	Sandra Oh	The Chair	Ji-Yoon Kim	Netflix
2021	Hannah Waddingham	Ted Lasso	Rebecca Welton	Apple TV+
2021	Lena Waithe	Master of None	Denise	Netflix
2022	Selena Gomez	Only Murders in the Building	Mabel Mora	Hulu
2022	Quinta Brunson	Abbott Elementary	Janine Teagues	ABC
2022	Kaley Cuoco	The Flight Attendant	Cassandra "Cassie" Bowden	HBO Max
2022	Ophelia Lovibond	Minx	Joyce Prigger	HBO Max
2022	Edi Patterson	The Righteous Gemstones	Judy Gemstone	HBO
2022	Jean Smart	Hacks	Deborah Vance	HBO Max
2023	Jennifer Coolidge	The White Lotus	Tanya McQuoid-Hunt	HBO
2023	Rachel Brosnahan	The Marvelous Mrs. Maisel	Miriam "Midge" Maisel	Prime Video
2023	Ayo Edebiri	The Bear	Sydney Adamu	FX on Hulu
2023	Elle Fanning	The Great	Catherine the Great	Hulu
2023	Selena Gomez	Only Murders in the Building	Mabel Mora	Hulu
2024	Emma Stone	The Curse	Whitney Siegel	Paramount+
2024	Kristen Bell	Nobody Wants This	Joanne	Netflix
2024	Quinta Brunson	Abbott Elementary	Janine Teagues	ABC
2024	Ayo Edebiri	The Bear	Sydney Adamu	FX on Hulu
2024	Selena Gomez	Only Murders in the Building	Mabel Mora	Hulu
2025	Kristen Bell	Nobody Wants This	Joanne	Netflix
2025	Quinta Brunson	Abbott Elementary	Janine Teagues	ABC
2025	Ayo Edebiri	The Bear	Sydney Adamu	FX on Hulu
2025	Selena Gomez	Only Murders in the Building	Mabel Mora	Hulu
2025	Natasha Lyonne	Poker Face	Charlie Cale	Peacock
2025	Jean Smart	Hacks	Deborah Vance	HBO Max
