= Kimmy Schmidt =

Fictional character on TV series Unbreakable Kimmy Schmidt

- Unbreakable Kimmy Schmidt character
- First appearance: "Kimmy Goes Outside!"
- Last appearance: Unbreakable Kimmy Schmidt: Kimmy vs the Reverend (Special)
- Created by: Tina Fey
- Portrayed by: Ellie Kemper

In-universe information
- Aliases: Kimmy Smith; Tony Ravioli
- Gender: Female
- Occupation: Nanny (former); Christmas Store elf (former); Uber driver (former); TaskRabbit (former); Head of HR at Giztoob (former); Author
- Family: Lori-Ann Schmidt (mother); Kymmi (half-sister); Randy (step-father)
- Spouse: Prince Frederick
- Significant others: Richard Wayne Gary Wayne (ex-husband; separated); Logan Beekman (ex-boyfriend); Dong Nguyen (ex-boyfriend)
- Nationality: American

Kimberly Cougar Schmidt is the title character of the Netflix original series Unbreakable Kimmy Schmidt.

== Fictional biography ==
Kimmy Schmidt was born in Durnsville, Indiana, around 1984 to 17-year-old Lori-Ann Schmidt. According to the episode "Kimmy Goes to Her Happy Place!", Kimmy is unsure who her father is (but is aware that his name starts with an "S" or a "5"), as he had sex with her mother in the bathroom of a Ruby Tuesday. Also, revealed in the same episode, she was born on a rollercoaster during a tornado warning. At the age of 14, Kimmy was kidnapped by Reverend Richard Wayne Gary Wayne (Jon Hamm) along with three other women – Donna Maria Nuñez (Sol Miranda), Cyndee Pokorny (Sara Chase), and Gretchen Chalker (Lauren Adams); the kidnapping is a reference to Ellie Kemper's past when she was a student in Hamm's drama class in high school when she was 14. They were placed in a bunker near Durnsville and were told that the apocalypse had come and that everyone else was dead. At some point, Kimmy found a rat from one of the vents, and realized the reverend was lying to them. When she confronted him, he told her she could send out Cyndee alone if she was so sure, and Kimmy, who was very attached to Cyndee, ended up deciding against it at the last moment.

After fifteen years in the bunker, the women were found and released, and made famous in the media as the "Indiana Mole Women", but Kimmy moved to New York City and went by the name "Kimmy Smith" to avoid the attention. She eventually arrived at an apartment building, and shared an apartment with Titus Andromedon (Tituss Burgess) under landlady Lillian Kaushtupper (Carol Kane), and proceeds to get a job working for Jacqueline Voorhees (Jane Krakowski). Here she meets the Voorhees family's tutor Charles (Andy Ridings), with whom she has an awkward, very brief relationship. Jacqueline sets her up on a date with Grant (John McMartin), a wealthy, elderly man with dementia. That relationship, however, doesn't work out either.

She joins a GED class in hopes of finishing her education, but it doesn't work out very well; so, she begins tutoring with one of the other adults in the class, immigrant Dong Nguyen (Ki Hong Lee), who falls in love with her. She teaches him better English, and he teaches her to be better at math. However, at a dinner party at Jacqueline's, she meets Logan Beekman (Adam Campbell), whom she ends up dating. He and Dong get in a fight over Kimmy at her 30th birthday party; however, they break up when Kimmy discovers he called the police on Dong (because of his being an illegal immigrant). She and Dong begin dating. Kimmy goes out of town to testify against the Reverend, who seems to be winning until Kimmy goes back into the bunker and finds a piece of evidence against him. She gets a call from Dong, and discovers he was forced to marry an old woman named Sonja (Suzan Perry) from their GED class in order to stay in the country.

Kimmy gets a job at an all-year Christmas store, but she is fired after she misses work several times on the account of Jacqueline. Later, she attempts a relationship with an Army veteran (Sam Page), but ends after accidentally assaulting him. Eventually, Kimmy and Dong attempt to reconcile their relationship by staying at an abandoned hotel in the Poconos. The two intend to have sex, but they are hindered by Kimmy reflexively hitting him every time he attempts intimacy – a reaction to the trauma that she suffered at the hands of the Reverend – and because Dong is allergic to latex condoms. The police find them, and later call Homeland Security in order to report Dong. He and Kimmy finally have sex in the back of a squad car. Soon after, Dong is deported back to Vietnam.

Soon after, Kimmy becomes an Uber driver, and meets Andrea Bayden (Tina Fey), a perpetually drunk therapist who helps her get over her breakup with Dong. Eventually, Andrea states that Kimmy's relationship issues stem from her abandonment issues related to her mother. As a result, Kimmy goes to Universal Studios Florida to find her rollercoaster-junkie mother Lori-Ann (Lisa Kudrow). The two quickly reconcile, but their issues are far from the surface. On a rollercoaster, Kimmy and Lori-Ann argue about why Lori-Ann had left Indiana after Kimmy disappeared, and also why Lori-Ann didn't go looking for her after she was rescued. Lori-Ann explains that she felt overwhelmed by motherhood (she had given birth to her daughter when she was 17), as well the wave of sympathy she received after Kimmy was kidnapped, and revealed that she attempted to find Kimmy after several years. Eventually, the two reconcile after several rides on a rollercoaster, with Lori-Ann promising to visit Kimmy in New York for Christmas. At the end of the season, Kimmy receives a call from the Reverend in prison, who reveals that he is engaged and has to annul his previous marriage – to Kimmy.

Kimmy finally graduates from her GED class and begins looking into colleges. Though she is originally going for community college, she ends up tearing up the application. She had hoped to pay for college with money she got through the divorce from the Reverend, but she ends up deciding not to divorce him after meeting his fiancée Wendy (Laura Dern), who is oblivious to the Reverend's true nature; Kimmy decides to stay married to the Reverend so he will not get the chance to hurt Wendy the way he hurt her. Kimmy begins doing work on TaskRabbit to try and make some money, and one of the tasks brings her to Columbia University where she finds Jacqueline's stepdaughter Xanthippe (Dylan Gelula), who is sharing her room with three girls on the rowing team who hate her. They want her to assemble a practice machine, which she does, and they let her try it. She proves exceptionally good at it due to her years turning the crank in the bunker, and she gets accepted into the university with a full scholarship. Also at Columbia, Kimmy finds Refrigerator, who goes by his middle name, Perry, (Daveed Diggs) who was her tour guide at county college and is now a student. They end up kissing, but when Perry says he wants to become a Reverend, she pushes him to the ground and runs.

Additionally, as the only registered voter in East Dogmouth, Kimmy votes Lillian onto city council. She then goes on to stop Gretchen, who has started a cult, from blowing up herself and a bunch of abducted teenage boys. Gretchen is then sent to prison. Kimmy decides to discover what religion really is, and joins a church with Titus. Kimmy is invited to a special dinner by her professor, where she meets Perry and apologizes for pushing him away. He accepts this apology, but when Kimmy's professor announces that her most interesting students are at the dinner and that Kimmy is a Mole Woman, Kimmy learns about how everybody googles everybody else these days, including Perry. Xanthippe comforts Kimmy and tells Kimmy about her own childhood embarrassing video available online, and then they search for a viral video of an adult – who turns out to be Kimmy's former therapist, Andrea. Kimmy tracks Andrea down by googling her and Andrea encourages Kimmy to accept that now she doesn't have to hide who she is. Later that day, Perry comes to Kimmy's class to rap about philosophy. It does not go very well, but Kimmy, noticing he is being filmed by numerous people, goes up with him, taking away some of his embarrassment. Their viral video is dubbed "Kimmy Schmidt and Friend Epic Rap FAIL."

Kimmy is also given an opportunity by Xanthippe to talk about her experience as a Mole Woman on her show, Profiles. Kimmy considers it, but realizes she does not want to and leaves the episode after introducing Titus. Kimmy gets kicked out of Columbia due to her poor grades and applies to become a crossing guard. Though she has an exceptionally good interview, she is rejected due to her marriage to the Reverend. She then gets employed by Zach (Noah Robbins), whom she met at Columbia but dropped out and is now starting his own company, bringing Kimmy in as the public relations for tech startup Giztoob.

Once she discovers a true crime documentary defending the Reverend and painting her in a negative light, she goes after one of the interviewees, men's rights activist Fran Dodd (Bobby Moynihan), and eventually decides to fight misogyny by writing children's books that set good examples for young boys. Kimmy writes a fantasy novel with an anti-toxic masculinity message, The Legends of Greemulax – which eventually got a real world version written by Sarah Mlynowski – which is rejected by publishers, but once a manuscript left with a producer that would work with Titus gets a good response from his son, Kimmy prints her own copies. Shortly before she is let go of her job as Giztoob is sold, she learns that the company does data mining and targeted advertising, and makes Zach help her by setting up a website to purchase The Legends of Greemulax and include it in searches for terms that interest teenagers. Kimmy thinks the website does not work, but as she discovers Xanthippe has read it, as have most of her fellow college students, turns out the connection is very unstable due to excessive demand. With Jacqueline as her agent, Kimmy becomes a successful author, with Greemulax inspiring its own area at Islands of Adventure.

Years later, Kimmy is engaged to Prince Frederick (Daniel Radcliffe), thirteenth in line to the throne of England. Once she discovers in her old backpack a Choose Your Own Adventure book she had never read, she confronts the Reverend in prison about it, learning he had taken it from a hostage in another bunker in West Virginia. Kimmy decides to go after this bunker, which ends up imperative once she learns the Reverend escaped prison and is headed there as well. She manages to catch up to him when he trips on a branch and severely injures his ankle. When he claims that he cannot remember where the underground bunker is located, Kimmy decides to fashion him a splint and help him return home only to discover the door to the hidden bunker. She manages to free the women inside. Later, she marries Frederick in a wedding officiated by Xanthippe.

== Friends and family ==
Kimmy, after her abduction, became close to the other women: Cyndee Pokorney, Donna Maria Nuñez, and Gretchen Chalker. However, Kimmy had a special attachment to Cyndee, whom she helped cure of her "Hulkamania" (an affliction which caused her to act like professional wrestler Hulk Hogan). Their relationship nearly was destroyed when the trial occurred, when it was revealed that Kimmy had the opportunity to escape alongside the others when Reverend Richard Wayne Gary Wayne allowed them to leave. However, after Kimmy proved that Wayne did in fact kidnap the women through video evidence, Cyndee and Kimmy's relationship was restored.

Upon arriving in New York, Kimmy met Titus Andromedon, a flamboyant, gay actor originally from Mississippi. The two became best friends after Kimmy moved into Titus' apartment in the pilot episode. Kimmy was also friends with their landlady Lillian Kaushtupper. Initially, Kimmy is on ambivalent terms with her boss Jacqueline Voorhees, but the two soon become allies when Kimmy expresses support for Jacqueline standing up for herself during her divorce from her husband. Jacqueline sometimes insults Kimmy for her look and clothing, though she is never outright mean to her. After Kimmy is released, she learns that she had a stepfather named Randy (Tim Blake Nelson), a state trooper who failed to find Kimmy during her missing years but ended up marrying her mother (who had left the family by the time the series began), and a younger half-sister Kymmi (Kiernan Shipka), a teenager who resents having grown up in the missing Kimmy's shadow. The family eventually reconciles, however.

At the end of the second season, Kimmy finds her mother Lori-Ann, a rollercoaster junkie, at Universal Studios Florida. While Lori-Ann quickly embraces her daughter (having not seen her since 1998), Kimmy is suspicious of her mother and has some difficulty reconnecting with her. It is also revealed that Kimmy's fear of Velcro is because Lori-Ann never taught her to tie her shoes, which resulted in her being left alone at the time of her kidnapping. Eventually, after several rides on a rollercoaster, Lori-Ann reveals that she was overwhelmed by the sympathy she received after Kimmy's disappearance and wanted to get away from it all. They eventually reconcile, with Lori-Ann promising to visit Kimmy at Christmas.

== Reception ==
=== Critical response ===
Kemper has received overall positive reviews for the part; critic Kate Erbland saying "The ever-peppy Ellie Kemper's ...optimism is perfectly suited to this material." Arthur Chu of Slate said "In general, The show is everything I loved about 30 Rock, with an added dose of something totally unexpected with Ellie Kemper's performance as the titular 13-going-on-30 '90s refugee." Ken Tucker of Yahoo! Entertainment wrote, "The show is super-clever, features a winning performance by The Office's Ellie Kemper, and moves like a well-oiled joke machine." Critic Tim Goodman of The Hollywood Reporter also praised her, saying "What infuses the entire series with sweetness and positivity is Kemper's never-flagging, completely endearing portrayal of Kimmy, who doesn't want to be a victim and doesn't want to waste another day of her life." David Weigand of the San Francisco Chronicle said "Kemper is hilarious, advancing perkiness to a comically psychotic level without having Kimmy ever lose her fundamental appeal." TV Guide's Joyce Emper said "Kemper sells Kimmy's wide-eyed naiveté and cluelessness at iPhones, selfies, slang and the like with irrepressible cheerfulness, curiosity and joy." Critic Robert Ham of Paste also praised her, saying "What is... evident is how perfect a star vehicle this is for Ellie Kemper." Matt Roush of TV Insider said "Kimmy is a beaming bundle of perversely adorable gumption, winningly played by The Office gamine Ellie Kemper." Vicki Hyman of NJ.com commended Kemper's performance, commenting "Kemper is delightfully daffy in this modern Mary Tyler Moore role, oozing wonder as she discovers the marvels of the new millennium -- matching tattoos?" Verne Gay of Newsday said "There never was any doubt that Ellie Kemper could anchor her own comedy series. She's all lightness, charm, vitality and teeth -- big bright ones that have a character all their own." Margaret Lyons of Vulture said "Kemper's just about perfect, and the show’s pretty damn good, too."
