= Claire Scanlon =

American editor and director (born 1971)

- Born: 1971 (age 54–55); Chicago, Illinois, U.S.
- Occupations: Editor, director
- Years active: 1996–present

Claire Elizabeth Scanlon (born 1971) is an American editor and director. She has been nominated for four Primetime Emmy Awards, winning one, for editing work on The Office and The Apprentice. She won an American Cinema Editors Award in 2014 (for The Office) and was nominated in 2016 (for The Wrecking Crew). She has directed for numerous television shows, including Unbreakable Kimmy Schmidt, The Good Place, Fresh Off the Boat, GLOW, and Brooklyn Nine-Nine. She made her directorial debut with the Netflix film Set It Up.

Scanlon directed the Unbreakable Kimmy Schmidt interactive special for Netflix.

== Filmography ==
=== Film ===
- Set It Up (2018)
- Unbreakable Kimmy Schmidt: Kimmy vs the Reverend (2020)
- The People We Hate at the Wedding (2022)
- The Love Hypothesis (2026)

=== Television ===
- Mapleworth Murders (2020)
