= Titus Andromedon =

Fictional character on tv series "The Unbreakable Kimmy Schmidt"

- Unbreakable Kimmy Schmidt character
- First appearance: "Kimmy Goes Outside!" (1.01); March 6, 2015
- Last appearance: Unbreakable Kimmy Schmidt: Kimmy vs. the Reverend (Special); May 12, 2020
- Created by: Tina Fey
- Portrayed by: Tituss Burgess

In-universe information
- Aliases: Ronald Effin Wilkerson (birth name); Cork Rockingham; Trevor Millionair; Flouncy Magoo; Jack Straightman; Johnny Mustache; Murasaki
- Occupation: Actor/Singer/Waiter
- Spouses: Vonda Brooks (m. 1998; sep. 1998) Mikey Politano (husband)
- Children: Keitha Hernandez (adopted daughter); Cape Politano-Andromedon (adopted son)
- Relatives: 5 unnamed aunts; at least 2 named Ernestine and one happens to be a pharmaceutical rep and ex teacher
- Nationality: American

Titus Andromedon (born Ronald Wilkerson) is a main character on the Netflix original series Unbreakable Kimmy Schmidt, portrayed by actor Tituss Burgess.

== Character life ==
Born Ronald Wilkerson in Chickasaw County, Mississippi, where he was raised by five aunts (one of whom, Ernestine, melted), Titus Andromedon knew from a young age he was gay, but had no choice but to stay in the closet. He had an extremely awkward time in high school as a popular kid on the football team with whom girls wanted to have sex. He was selected as prom king. He remained in the closet until his wedding day to childhood friend Vonda Jeanne Brooks (Pernell Walker). The thought of the wedding night was too much for him and he fled the reception without saying goodbye, traveling to New York to begin a new life under a new name, Titus Andromedon, an egg corn of Titus Andronicus that he seemingly came up with spontaneously whilst fleeing his own wedding reception.

Titus is an aspiring Broadway performer. He auditioned for The Lion King on Broadway at least 20 times and never got in because he did not come off as straight. He tried to put on his own production, but only got one audience member, who had come to serve him a copyright lawsuit. His rival is Coriolanus Burt (James Monroe Iglehart), who beat him for the role of Sharecropper #2/Cow in Alabama!, an all-black version of Oklahoma!, by running onto the stage in the middle of his performance at callbacks and announcing the death of Gianni Versace.

Titus rents from Lillian Kaushtupper (Carol Kane), and makes extra money by walking around dressed as an Iron Man-esque character. Kimmy Schmidt (Ellie Kemper) becomes his roommate, and convinces him to return the costume and get back his investment fee, which, with some effort, he does. The money, $200, is stolen from him. He manages to get new headshots taken, and gets an agent. He auditions for the role of Spider-Man #12 in the new Broadway musical Spider-Man Too: 2 Many Spider-Men (a parody of Spider-Man: Turn Off the Dark and "Spider-Verse"). He loses the role to Coriolanus but is happy because he realizes that if Coriolanus is going out for the same awful roles he is then the Alabama! role was not the big break he thought it was.

Titus makes a music video of an original song titled "Pinot Noir", "an ode to Black penis". Lillian films it for him, though finding the exact location is hard (including a bat-infested chandelier factory). As a result, he helps Xanthippe Voorhees (Dylan Gelula), the stepdaughter of Kimmy's employer Jacqueline White (Jane Krakowski), clean up after a drunken party, in order to shoot the video in her house and keep from getting Kimmy fired.

Kimmy gets Titus a gig singing at Jacqueline's dinner party, where he meets the owner of a spooky-themed singing restaurant, where he gets a part as a Frankenwolf. He auditions for a part at the restaurant with a monologue, but after he does not get it, he takes very intense acting lessons about how to act like a straight man.

Titus drags Kimmy down to Indiana for the trial of her kidnapper Rev. Richard Wayne Gary Wayne (Jon Hamm), where he takes all the TV and radio show interviews for her. One TV show starts without him realizing, causing his viral video Gonna Be Famous (Remix) to become an Internet hit. This video later led to Titus' wife Vonda, who believed he was dead, arriving in Indiana to see him.

At the start of the show's second season, Vonda attempts to sue Titus for spousal support; however, as Titus was legally declared dead in 2008, Vonda's lawsuit could not go forward. It is later revealed that Vonda wants only an apology from Titus, which he initially refuses to give, but Kimmy eventually pushes him to do it. Titus, who is often resistant to relationships because he feels he will be let down at the end, later becomes involved with a construction worker named Mikey Politano (Mike Carlsen), who initially struggles with his sexuality and comes out with Titus' help.

Titus begins workshopping his new musical Kimono You Didn't: Murasaki's Journey, about his past life as a geisha, which initially sparked internet controversy but was ultimately well-received. After being promoted to Spooky Gravedigger, he quits his job at Dr. Dracula's Spooky Lab & Bar & Grill.

He books a part as a swing in a production called Mahogany starring Dionne Warwick (portrayed by Maya Rudolph) on a cruise ship departing from Miami. On the cruise, Titus and Warwick become very close, and when she falls ill she has him take over her role for nine performances. Titus is very well received, and becomes addicted to the attention. He intentionally poisons Warwick and accidentally poisons the rest of the ship to try to continue his role. Ashamed, he leaves the cruise on a lifeboat, eating his $10,000 worth of checks, his wigs, and a dolphin to keep from starving. He ends up arriving back in New York early.

Titus auditions for Sesame Street and is offered a role on the condition that he has a three-way with the producer and a puppet, Mr. Frumpus (Bill Barretta), which he refuses. He sees what appears to be Mikey cheating on him, and records his own version of Beyoncé's Lemonade before realizing he is wrong. He goes on to break up with Mikey because he did not want to have to put the stress on him of being his first and only boyfriend.

Titus gets a job singing backup vocals for highly-offensive conspiracy theory songs, and ended up also singing lead vocals for a song called "Boobs in California", which proves a surprise hit. Titus' likeness is also used for the villain in a series of medicine commercials (which he auditioned for but the company thought he was crazy).

Kimmy convinces Titus to go to church for the first time since he was twelve. He joins the choir, and ends up dating the lead singer, a man named Reuben (Michael Benjamin Washington). He ends up breaking up with Reuben, realizing that while he is a great guy, he is not the right kind of guy for Titus.

Titus ends up working for Jacqueline twice; first, she hires him to play her gay best friend and come into her apartment and throw a fit (in an effort to get her brother in law to stop trying to sleep with her). However, when this fails, Titus ends up pretending to be straight and in love with Jacqueline. She later hires him to sing the National Anthem over the phone for an NFL meeting, as a method of distracting the members while she climbed up the stairs to rejoin the meeting.

After all this, Titus appears on Xanthippe Voorhees' interview show Profiles, replacing Kimmy who refused to do it.

Jacqueline gets Titus a gig singing at a sports event in an attempt to get back Mikey, ending with Titus confessing his feelings. The experience makes Jacqueline decide to be Titus's agent.

In season four, Titus decides to write a script, The Capist, to win back Mikey. He uses a high-profile actor who offers to allow him to pitch his work for the fictional YouTube Brown. During the episode "Party Monster", Titus is featured for the actions that he did for what he thought was a stock footage gig. He auditions for a kids' acting troupe and shows that nerds can be jocks, and not everyone is a cliche. The principal (Duane Boutte) hires him as a theatre teacher to direct Beaudy An' The Beest. After his Beest quits the show, Titus plays the Beest himself, although he has left out Hudson (Juwan Crawley), essentially a younger version of himself. Eventually, Titus lets Hudson play the Beest. After that, Titus struggles to finish The Capist to pitch it to YouTube Brown, so he steals Kimmy's young adult novel and pitches it instead. He is rejected. The show ends happily though, with a song, and Titus, Kimmy, Lillian, and Jacqueline eating a Fudgie the Whale cake. It comes to light that some people who speak Hebrew are spying on them, but it is not revealed who they are or why they are spying.

After landing a very minor role in one episode of a network TV show, Titus believes he has made his big break, and begins noticing the attention of an attractive man, Ilan (Jon Bernthal), at his coffee place (a car wash with free coffee). Titus goes for a walk and later dinner with Ilan, who seems to only want to know stories of his past history, which Titus mistakes for being starstruck. In reality, Ilan was hired by a group trying to dig up dirt on Titus, as well as everyone else who may come out about Mr. Frumpus' sexual harassment claims. Ilan explains how he trained with special forces and witnessed the atrocities of war, but Titus' delusional behavior is what finally broke him, and he quits. Titus is left reeling with the realization that he is not the actor he thought he was.

Jacqueline arranges for Titus to masquerade as the love interest of a straight TV host, and invites Mikey and his boyfriend Andrew (Brandon Andrus) to dinner in order to make Mikey jealous. Titus' plan backfires when Mikey sees the two of them so happy and realizes he and Andrew had been dating too long. Mikey proposes to Andrew, to Titus' horror. Attempting to repair the situation, Titus proposes as well but is rebuffed as the host decides he does not need to pretend to be gay, leaving Titus further embarrassed.

Titus takes his theater class to see a production of Cats on Broadway and is disgusted by the quality of the acting. After asking Lillian to bring him some costume pieces, he sneaks on stage when the cats return from prowling through the audience. Expecting punishment at the end of the show, he is unexpectedly welcomed into the troupe, and informed that he had discovered the secret of Cats, that anyone can get on stage and become part of the show. Titus is sworn to secrecy but leaks the information to Jacqueline, who then uses it to poach Greg Kinnear from a rival agent by offering him a role on a Broadway show that day. Titus is discovered to have leaked the secret and is kicked out of the show.

In the finale, Titus finally achieves his dream role, playing the understudy to Rafiki in The Lion King on Broadway. He is elated to find the current actress playing the role (Myra Lucretia Taylor) to be old and frail and is excited that he will soon have the part. Around this time, Mikey calls him and asks if he would sing at his wedding. Titus is confused by the request but accepts as he cannot turn down the chance for drama. Titus is forced to miss the wedding, however, as he is needed on stage. Kimmy goes to tell Mikey, who is upset because he wanted Titus to cause drama. Believing Titus hadn't fought to get him back since the boat, Kimmy explains all the crazy things he had done for Mikey, leaving him conflicted. Titus tries to leave the show during intermission to crash Mikey's wedding, only to find that Mikey has come to him. Professing their love, they kiss, and Mikey tearfully watches Titus live his dream on Broadway.

Four years later, Titus is interviewed on the red carpet for his feature film debut in Sliding Doors 2: Tokyo Doors (a reference to a previous episode that paid homage to Sliding Doors). Mikey and Titus are married, with two adopted children Keitha Hernandez and Cape Politano-Andromedon.

Further in the future, Titus is preparing to work in action film Explosion Man when Kimmy brings him along in a journey to discover the origins of a book that she found in her backpack. After Kimmy confronts Rev. Wayne in his prison in Indiana, they go to West Virginia, where Wayne was keeping more women hostage. In the city where the book was withdrawn, Titus helps get a response from the previously uncooperative locals by singing "Free Bird", and turns out Wayne had escaped prison and was going in the direction of the bunker. Titus follows Kimmy in her pursuit of Wayne until he accidentally stumbles upon the film set for Explosion Man, to the relief of Jacqueline, who had been trying to hide his absence from the crew. He is later seen attending Kimmy's wedding.

== Critical reception ==
Burgess has received critical acclaim for his performance. Many critics hail him as the "scene-stealer" and breakout character of the series. He was nominated for the Primetime Emmy Award for Outstanding Supporting Actor in a Comedy Series in 2015, 2016, 2017, 2018 and 2020.

Year	Category	Nominee	Result
2015	Webby Award	Best Actor	Won
2015	Critics' Choice Television Award	Best Supporting Actor in a Comedy Series	Nominated
2015	Primetime Emmy Award	Outstanding Supporting Actor in a Comedy Series	Nominated
2016	Gay and Lesbian Entertainment Critics Association	TV Performance of the Year – Actor	Nominated
2016	Primetime Emmy Award	Outstanding Supporting Actor in a Comedy Series	Nominated
2017	Primetime Emmy Award	Outstanding Supporting Actor in a Comedy Series	Nominated
2018	Primetime Emmy Award	Outstanding Supporting Actor in a Comedy Series	Nominated
2020	Primetime Emmy Award	Outstanding Supporting Actor in a Limited Series or Movie	Nominated
2020	Black Reel Awards	Outstanding Supporting Actor in a TV Movie or Limited Series	Nominated
2020	Gold Derby Awards	Supporting Actor in a Movie/Limited Series	Nominated
