= Jacqueline White (Unbreakable Kimmy Schmidt) =

Unbreakable Kimmy Schmidt character

- Unbreakable Kimmy Schmidt character
- First appearance: "Kimmy Goes Outside!"
- Last appearance: "Unbreakable Kimmy Schmidt: Kimmy vs the Reverend" (Special)
- Created by: Tina Fey
- Portrayed by: Jane Krakowski

In-universe information
- Aliases: Jackie Lynn White (birth name); Jacqueline Voorhees (former married name)
- Gender: Female
- Occupation: Philanthropist; Flight attendant; Talent agent
- Family: Virgil White (father); Fern White (mother)
- Spouses: Julian Voorhees (ex-husband); Russ Snyder (ex-husband)
- Children: Buckley Voorhees (son); Xanthippe Voorhees (former stepdaughter)

Jackie Lynn "Jacqueline" White (formerly Voorhees) is a fictional character on the Netflix original sitcom Unbreakable Kimmy Schmidt. Portrayed by Jane Krakowski, she is a wealthy and insecure socialite. Krakowski was nominated for a Primetime Emmy Award in 2015 and won a Critics' Choice Television Award in 2016 for her performance.

== Character life ==
Born Jackie Lynn White to Fern (Sheri Foster) and Virgil White (Gil Birmingham) of the Lakota people, White grew up hating her Native American heritage and wishing she were white. She left home and purchased contact lenses to make her eyes blue, dyed her hair blonde, and changed her name to Jacqueline.

She became a flight attendant, and met then-married billionaire businessman Julian Voorhees (Mark Harelik). The two began an affair, and upon Jacqueline becoming pregnant, Julian divorced his then wife Helene (Christine Ebersole), leaving him with custody of their daughter Xanthippe (Dylan Gelula). Jacqueline had her son Buckley several months later, followed by Jacqueline and Julian's wedding.

Julian was frequently out of town on business ventures, leaving Jacqueline at home with Buckley, Xanthippe, the housekeeper Vera, and a genetically modified Shih Tzu named Abattoir. Buckley was taken care of by a number of nannies, but they always left due to his hyperactivity and Xanthippe's bad girl attitude or were fired. Jacqueline has undergone plastic surgery and done several unique activities for physical fitness.

She continued her socialite life for several years, and at some point published a cookbook, before eventually meeting Kimmy Schmidt, who she hired as an assistant and a new nanny for Buckley. She ends up growing fond of Kimmy and confesses that she thinks Julian has been cheating on her with somebody in Japan. She does several things to try to catch him in the act, all of which fail, before finding out he was sleeping with their therapist.

Despite some hesitation about financial loss, Jacqueline divorces Julian, putting Xanthippe back in the custody of her birth mother, and leaving Buckley in Jacqueline's custody. There is nothing to suggest that her parents are aware of Buckley's existence; they have never spoken of him and Jacqueline has never mentioned him in the presence of her parents. Even when Jacqueline's parents watch football with her at her New York apartment, Kimmy is in attendance, but not Buckley. However, in only the previous episode, a framed photograph of Buckley is clearly visible in Jacqueline's apartment. When Buckley's tutor is constructing Buckley's family tree, Buckley does not provide any information about his grandparents, suggesting that he has never met them.

Following the divorce, Jacqueline decides to return to her roots. She cherishes a morning star necklace that her grandmother gave her as a reminder of her heritage. Her parents are aware that the necklace is in her possession, but later on claim that her grandmother was buried with it. She is found unhelpful and idiotic in her old home, and ends up returning to New York. She struggles to maintain her socialite status, bonds with Buckley and tries to use her status to support oppressed Native Americans.

Jacqueline discovers that the family of her boyfriend Russ Snyder (David Cross) owns the Washington Redskins. She plots to make the family change the name, as it is a name based on Native American stereotypes. During a planned fight, Russ suddenly proposes, prompting Jacqueline to run away as he pursues. After he is hit by an electric car, the couple marry while Russ is in a full-body cast, unable to speak. She convinces Russ's father to rename the team from the Redskins to the Gun-Takers, which she justifies saying that the outrage will gain attention and profit.

Meanwhile, Russ's condition improves. The bandages are removed, and she discovers that her husband has become extremely attractive (now being played by Billy Magnussen), and their relationship becomes more sexual. Russ shortly embraces his newfound attractiveness and changes as a person due to it. Russ's family accepts him now that he is much more attractive, and he chooses his brothers and father over Jacqueline, bringing an end to their relationship.

After getting Titus Andromedon a gig at a sports event, Jacqueline becomes a talent agent, working in the same coworking space as Kimmy's employer Giztoob. However, she is forced to move in with in with Kimmy after becoming unable to afford her own apartment. She and landlady Lillian Kaushtupper make a scheme to get it back by seducing the subleaser Broderick Knob, but once they arrive they find his son Broderick "Tripp" Knob III (Paul Walter Hauser) living there instead, who Jacqueline manages to convince into becoming an actor. She gets a third client in Greg Kinnear, who she met as his son studied with Buckley. While Jacqueline gets Titus his original dream job in The Lion King, Tripp returns from Los Angeles revealing he had signed with rival agent Eli Rubin (Zachary Quinto). Eli does his best to undermine Jacqueline, also poaching Kinnear and renting the whole office where Giztoob was before. Kimmy's arrival leads Eli to reveal that her book The Legends of Greemulax has become a success, which prompts Jacqueline to sign Kimmy as her client. Jacqueline eventually becomes rich as both Titus and Kimmy get successful careers.

Years later, as Kimmy takes Titus with her on a rescue mission in West Virginia, Jacqueline is left alone on the set of his new action film, and forced to keep the secret that Titus is gone from the production staff. She is later seen attending Kimmy's wedding.

== Critical response ==
Krakowski has received critical acclaim for her performance. In 2015, she was nominated for the Primetime Emmy Award for Outstanding Supporting Actress in a Comedy Series. In 2016, she won the Critics' Choice Television Award for Best Supporting Actress in a Comedy Series.

Several commentators criticized the reveal that the character was a Native American passing as white, due to the casting of a white actress such as Jane Krakowski to play the character, with some characterizing the portrayal as offensive.
