= Unbreakable Kimmy Schmidt: Kimmy vs the Reverend =

2020 interactive film directed by Claire Scanlon

- Official release poster
- Based on: Unbreakable Kimmy Schmidt by: Tina Fey; and Robert Carlock
- Written by: Tina Fey; Meredith Scardino; Robert Carlock; Sam Means
- Directed by: Claire Scanlon
- Starring: Ellie Kemper; Jane Krakowski; Tituss Burgess; Carol Kane; Daniel Radcliffe; Jon Hamm
- Music by: Jeff Richmond
- Country of origin: United States
- Original language: English

Production
- Producers: Tina Fey; Jeff Richmond; David Miner; Meredith Scardino; Robert Carlock; Sam Means; Joshua Huffman
- Cinematography: John Inwood
- Editor: Kyle Gilman
- Running time: 80 minutes
- Production companies: Universal Television; 3 Arts Entertainment; Bevel Gears; Little Stranger

Original release
- Network: Netflix
- Release: May 12, 2020

Unbreakable Kimmy Schmidt: Kimmy vs the Reverend is a 2020 interactive film sequel to the sitcom Unbreakable Kimmy Schmidt created by Tina Fey and Robert Carlock, directed by Claire Scanlon. It stars Ellie Kemper, Jane Krakowski, Tituss Burgess and Carol Kane. The special was nominated for two Emmy Awards: Outstanding Television Movie and Outstanding Supporting Actor in a Limited Series or Movie for Burgess.

The movie employs interactive technology to allow the audience to choose their own adventure and various choices they make early on also affect how the story ends with multiple possible endings.

The episode was removed from Netflix on May 12, 2025.

== Plot ==
Due to its interactive nature, the film offers various possible "endings" that lead to the film's ending earlier depending on choices the viewer makes. However, all early endings result in the audience being re-routed to a choice that extends the story with the final shape of the film resembling the following plot points:

Kimmy Schmidt, now a hugely successful children's author, plans her wedding to Prince Frederick, who is thirteenth in line to the throne of England. Joining her are her friends Titus Andromedon, Lillian Kaushtupper, and Jacqueline White. When looking in her backpack, Kimmy finds a Choose Your Own Adventure-style book she has never seen in a hidden pocket. After reading the book and realizing it was not one of hers, she decides to travel to the prison in Durnsville, Indiana to question Richard Wayne Gary Wayne, the man who kept her captive for fifteen years, with Titus coming with her as support.

After realizing that Frederick never had a girlfriend before Kimmy, Lillian suggests he spend the night before his wedding coming to terms with his past and realizing how amazing Kimmy is. Left alone on the set of Titus' new action film, Jacqueline attempts to keep the secret that Titus is gone from the production staff.

In Durnsville, Richard Wayne Gary Wayne reveals to Kimmy that he had a second underground bunker. Using information Richard had accidentally disclosed and the name of the library the book was taken from, Kimmy and Titus go looking for the second bunker, their journey made even more imperative when they learn Richard has escaped from prison and is headed to the bunker himself.

Kimmy and Titus are eventually separated when Kimmy finds Richard and chases him. She manages to catch up to him when he trips on a branch and severely injures his ankle. When he claims that he cannot remember where the underground bunker is located, Kimmy decides to fashion him a splint and help him return home, only to discover the door to the hidden bunker. She manages to free the women inside.

Later on, Kimmy and Frederick marry in a ceremony officiated by Jacqueline's former stepdaughter Xanthippe. Depending on the choices made by the viewer, Kimmy reveals to Frederick that she is pregnant, and Frederick's schoolmate Kim Jong Un arrives to celebrate.

== Cast ==
- Ellie Kemper as Kimmy Schmidt
- Jane Krakowski as Jacqueline White
- Tituss Burgess as Titus Andromedon
- Carol Kane as Lillian Kaushtupper/Fiona
- Daniel Radcliffe as Prince Frederick
- Jon Hamm as Richard Wayne Gary Wayne
- Lauren Adams as Gretchen Chalker
- Sara Chase as Cyndee Pokorny
- Sol Miranda as Donna Maria Nuñez
- Amy Sedaris as Mimi Kanassis
- Dylan Gelula as Xanthippe Voorhees
- Jack McBrayer as Sandy Parcell
- Heidi Gardner as Jenny
- Zak Orth as Cody Santimonio
- Tanner Flood as Buckley Voorhees
- Mike Britt as Walter Bankston
- Fred Armisen as Robert "Bobby" Durst
- Mike Carlsen as Mikey Politano
- Stephanie D'Abruzzo as Jan
- Bill Barretta as Mr. Frumpus
- Niceto Darcey Festin as George Georgiulio
- Josh Groban as himself
- Bowen Yang as Kim Jong Un

== Production ==
The special was written using Netflix's Branch Manager technology to "push comedy to places it's never been before."

The trailer for the special was released on April 15, 2020.

== Release and reception ==
The film was released on Netflix on May 12, 2020. Review aggregator Rotten Tomatoes has an approval rating of 94%, based on 33 reviews, with an average rating of 7.8/10. The site's critical consensus reads: "Kimmy and company return as resilient as ever in a fun and fast paced special that makes excellent use of its interactive capabilities to produce maximum fabulosity."

=== Awards and nominations ===
| Award | Category | Recipient(s) | Result | Ref. |
|---|---|---|---|---|
| 72nd Primetime Emmy Awards | Outstanding Television Movie | Robert Carlock, Tina Fey, Jeff Richmond, David Miner, Sam Means, Meredith Scardino, Eric Gurian & Kerry Orent | Nominated | |
| 72nd Primetime Emmy Awards | Outstanding Supporting Actor in a Limited Series or Movie | Tituss Burgess | Nominated | |
| 20th Annual Black Reel Awards | Outstanding Supporting Actor in a TV Movie or Limited Series | Tituss Burgess | Nominated | |
