= Tituss Burgess =

American actor and singer (born 1979)

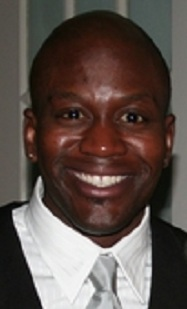
- Burgess in 2008
- Born: February 21, 1979 (age 47); Athens, Georgia, U.S.
- Education: University of Georgia (BA)
- Occupations: Actor; singer
- Years active: 2005–present
- Known for: Unbreakable Kimmy Schmidt; The Little Mermaid

Tituss Burgess (born February 21, 1979) is an American actor and singer. He has appeared in several Broadway musicals. He is best known for starring as Titus Andromedon on the Netflix comedy series Unbreakable Kimmy Schmidt (2015–2020), for which he received five Primetime Emmy Award nominations. He is featured in Schmigadoon! (2023).

On the Broadway stage, Burgess originated the roles of Eddie in Good Vibrations, Hal Miller in Jersey Boys, Sebastian in The Little Mermaid and Nicely-Nicely Johnson in the 2009 revival of Guys and Dolls. In 2023, he took over the role of Harold Zidler in Moulin Rouge! and took over the title role in Oh, Mary! in March 2025.

== Early and personal life ==
Born and raised in Athens, Georgia, Burgess attended Cedar Shoals High School where he was active in the theatre program. He graduated from the University of Georgia with a Bachelor of Art degree in music. Burgess is gay. After college, Burgess moved to Orlando, Florida to work at Walt Disney World, where he performed as a vocalist at the Festival of the Lion King at Disney's Animal Kingdom, earning his Actors Equity card.

== Career ==
=== 2005–2014: Broadway debut ===
Burgess made his Broadway debut in the musical Good Vibrations as Eddie in 2005, and then appeared in Jersey Boys in 2005 as Hal Miller. Burgess originated the role of Sebastian the Crab in the Broadway musical The Little Mermaid in 2007 opposite Sierra Boggess, Sean Palmer, and Norm Lewis. Burgess portrayed Nicely-Nicely Johnson, traditionally played by a white actor, in the revival of Guys and Dolls in 2009. He performed in several regional theater productions, including The Wiz and Jesus Christ Superstar.

Burgess performed at the "Broadway for Obama" benefit concert at the State Theatre Center for the Arts in Easton, Pennsylvania on October 20, 2008. He performed at the "Broadway After Dark" benefit concert on October 26, 2008, in New York City, and in a solo concert at Birdland in New York City on July 27, 2009.

In July 2009, he was a performer on the R Family Vacations Summer Cruise. Three months later, he was featured on an episode of the popular web show The Battery's Down. He appeared in Season 5 of 30 Rock as D'Fwan, a member of Tracy Jordan's wife's entourage. He reprised the role in Season 6. He was cast as The Caterpillar in the 2011 Broadway musical Wonderland in October 2010. A month later he dropped out of the project.

In March 2013, Burgess performed "And I Am Telling You I'm Not Going" from the Broadway musical Dreamgirls at Broadway Cares/Equity Fights AIDS fundraising concert Broadway Backwards. He was cast as The Witch, a role traditionally played by a female, in Into the Woods in a 2015 production by DreamCatcher Theatre, presented in Miami's Carnival Studio Theater at the Adrienne Arsht Center.

=== 2015–2019: Unbreakable Kimmy Schmidt ===
On March 6, 2015, Netflix released the first season of Unbreakable Kimmy Schmidt which stars Burgess in a main role as Titus Andromedon, Kimmy's roommate. He received universal acclaim for his performance, with The New York Times saying the role was "tailor-made" for him. For his performance in the first season, he received a nomination for Best Supporting Actor in a Comedy Series at the 2015 Critics' Choice Television Awards and an Emmy nomination for Outstanding Supporting Actor in a Comedy Series at the 2015 ceremony.

In June 2016, Burgess and Norm Lewis reprised their roles of Sebastian the Crab and King Triton in the Hollywood Bowl concert event of The Little Mermaid opposite Sara Bareilles, Rebel Wilson, and Darren Criss. He took a voice role in The Angry Birds Movie (2016). He was a guest star judge in the third season of RuPaul's Drag Race All Stars (2017). He took guest roles in Miracle Workers (2019) and The Good Fight (2019).

=== 2020–present: Return to Broadway ===
From 2020 to 2022, he starred in the musical cartoon series Central Park as Cole Tillerman, with Leslie Odom Jr., Kristen Bell, Daveed Diggs, Josh Gad, Kathryn Hahn and Stanley Tucci. Burgess starred as Remy in a benefit concert presentation of Ratatouille the Musical, an internet meme that originated on TikTok, inspired by the 2007 Disney/Pixar film. It streamed on TodayTix on January 1, 2021. On December 2, 2021, he played Rooster Hannigan in the NBC special Annie Live!.

In 2023, he played the Narrator in the second season of the Apple TV+ musical comedy series Schmigadoon!. From October 10 to December 17, 2023, he returned to Broadway in Moulin Rouge! as Harold Zidler. He starred as Mary Todd Lincoln in the Broadway production of Oh, Mary! for a temporary engagement from March to April 2025. He reprised the role from June 23 to August 2, 2025.

== Filmography ==
=== Film ===
Year	Title	Role	Notes
2014	Are You Joking?	Hank Trenton	
2016	The Angry Birds Movie	Photog	Voice
2016	Catfight	John	
2017	Smurfs: The Lost Village	Vanity Smurf	Voice
2018	Set It Up	Creepy Tim	
2018	Then Came You	Julian	
2019	I Hate Kids	The Amazing Fabular	
2019	Dolemite Is My Name	Theodore Toney	
2019	The Addams Family	Glenn	Voice
2021	Respect	James Cleveland	
2021	Hot Mess Holiday	Himself	
2023	The Slumber Party	Mesmer	
2024	Spellbound	Sunny, the Oracle of the Sun	Voice
2025	Snow White	Bashful	Voice and facial motion capture
2026	The Cat in the Hat	The Psychic Narwhal	Voice

=== Television ===
Year	Title	Role	Notes
2009	Schoolhouse Rock	Narrator	Episode: "The Rainforest" (Earth Rock series)
2009	The Battery's Down	Mr. Z	2 episodes
2011	A Gifted Man	Larry the Guard	Episode: "In Case of Discomfort"
2011–2012	30 Rock	D'Fwan	4 episodes
2012	Blue Bloods	Priest	Episode: "The Life We Chose"
2013	Royal Pains	Kristoff	Episode: "Bones to Pick"
2015–2019	Unbreakable Kimmy Schmidt	Titus Andromedon	Series regular, 52 episodes (seasons 1-4)
2016	Match Game	Himself	Regular panelist
2016–2018	Elena of Avalor	Charoca	Voice, 2 episodes
2017	Julie's Greenroom	Himself	Episode: "Costumer Service"
2017	RuPaul's Drag Race All Stars	Himself (Guest Judge)	Episode: "Pop Art Ball"
2019	Miracle Workers	God's brother	Episode: "1 Day"
2019	The Good Fight	Wade V.	Episode: "The One with the Celebrity Divorce"
2020	Unbreakable Kimmy Schmidt: Kimmy vs the Reverend	Titus Andromedon	Netflix television movie
2020	Dishmantled	Himself (host)	10 episodes
2020	Sing On!	Himself (host)	Series regular
2020–2022	Central Park	Cole Tillerman, Kelleth Vanbeaceler	Voice, series regular
2021	Annie Live!	Rooster Hannigan	Television special
2021	Name That Tune	Himself	Guest
2022	Teletubbies	Narrator	Series regular (2022 Netflix reboot)
2022	Name That Tune	Himself	Guest
2023	Schmigadoon!	Narrator	Season Two Regular
2023	The Wonder Years	Lonnie	Episode: "One Small Step"
2024	Last Bite Hotel	Himself	Host
2027	The Elephant & Piggie Show!	Elephant Gerald	Voice

=== Video games ===
Year	Title	Voice Role	Notes
2013	Grand Theft Auto V	Bob Mulét	Credited under "The Local Population." Notable voice appearance in WCTR program, "Chakra Attack," as the "Potato Water Guy" in the coconut water discussion.

== Theatre credits ==
Date	Title	Role	Venue/Location
October 31, 2003 – February 8, 2004	La Cage aux Folles	Jacob	Downtown Cabaret Theatre, Bridgeport, Connecticut
October 5, 2004 – January 16, 2005	Jersey Boys	Barry Belson/Hal Miller/Ensemble	La Jolla Playhouse, San Diego, California
February 2 – April 24, 2005	Good Vibrations	Eddie	Eugene O'Neill Theatre, Broadway
November 6, 2005 – July 31, 2006	Jersey Boys	Barry Belson/Hal Miller/Ensemble	August Wilson Theatre, Broadway
September 26 – November 26, 2006	The Wiz	The Lion	La Jolla Playhouse, San Diego, California
July 26 – September 9, 2007	The Little Mermaid	Sebastian the Crab	Denver Center for the Performing Arts, Denver, Colorado
November 3, 2007 – August 3, 2008	The Little Mermaid	Sebastian the Crab	Lunt-Fontanne Theatre, Broadway
October 28 – December 7, 2008	The Little Mermaid	Sebastian the Crab	Lunt-Fontanne Theatre, Broadway
March 1 – June 14, 2009	Guys and Dolls	Nicely-Nicely Johnson	Nederlander Theatre, Broadway
December 8–30, 2012	A Wind in the Willows Christmas	Mr. Toad	Two River Theater, Red Bank, New Jersey
January 22, 2015 – February 15, 2015	Into the Woods	The Witch	Arsht Center, Miami, Florida
June 3–6, 2016	The Little Mermaid	Sebastian the Crab	Hollywood Bowl, Los Angeles, California
January 1, 2021	Ratatouille the Musical	Remy	Online Benefit Concert
December 2, 2021	Annie	Rooster Hannigan	Gold Coast Studios, Bethpage, New York
October 10 – December 17, 2023	Moulin Rouge! The Musical	Harold Zidler	Al Hirschfeld Theatre, Broadway
September 30 – October 13, 2024	The Indecisive Warrior	Himself	Phoenix Arts Club, London
March 18 – April 6, 2025	Oh, Mary!	Mary Todd Lincoln	Lyceum Theatre, Broadway
June 23 – August 2, 2025	Oh, Mary!	Mary Todd Lincoln	Lyceum Theatre, Broadway
September 21, 2025	Songs for a New World	Man No. 1	Hammersmith Apollo, 30th Anniversary Concert

== Discography ==
- Jersey Boys (2005) Original Cast Recording
- Here's To You (2006) debut solo studio album, available on iTunes
- Disney's The Little Mermaid (2008) Original Cast Recording
- The Wonderful Wizard of Oz (2018) Audiobook, narrator
- Saint Tituss (2019)

== Awards and nominations ==
Year	Award	Category	Nominated work	Result	Ref
2008	Broadway.com Audience Award	Favorite Featured Actor in a Musical	The Little Mermaid	Nominated	
2015	Webby Award	Best Actor	Unbreakable Kimmy Schmidt	Won	
2015	Critics' Choice Television Award	Best Supporting Actor in a Comedy Series	Unbreakable Kimmy Schmidt	Nominated	
2015	Gold Derby TV Award	Best Supporting Actor in a Comedy	Unbreakable Kimmy Schmidt	Won	
2015	Dorian Award	TV Performance of the Year, actor	Unbreakable Kimmy Schmidt	Nominated	
2015	Primetime Emmy Awards	Outstanding Supporting Actor in a Comedy Series	Unbreakable Kimmy Schmidt	Nominated	
2016	Primetime Emmy Awards	Outstanding Supporting Actor in a Comedy Series	Unbreakable Kimmy Schmidt	Nominated	
2017	Primetime Emmy Awards	Outstanding Supporting Actor in a Comedy Series	Unbreakable Kimmy Schmidt	Nominated	
2018	Primetime Emmy Awards	Outstanding Supporting Actor in a Comedy Series	Unbreakable Kimmy Schmidt	Nominated	
2018	Critics' Choice Television Awards	Best Supporting Actor in a Comedy Series	Unbreakable Kimmy Schmidt	Nominated	
2020	Primetime Emmy Awards	Outstanding Supporting Actor in a Limited Series or Movie	Unbreakable Kimmy Schmidt: Kimmy vs. the Reverend	Nominated	
2021	Primetime Emmy Awards	Outstanding Character Voice-Over Performance	Central Park: A Fish Called Snakehead	Nominated	
2024	Broadway.com Audience Award	Favorite Replacement (Male)	Moulin Rouge! The Musical	Nominated	
2025	Broadway.com Audience Award	Favorite Replacement (Male)	Oh, Mary!	Nominated	
