= Unbreakable Kimmy Schmidt =

American comedy television series

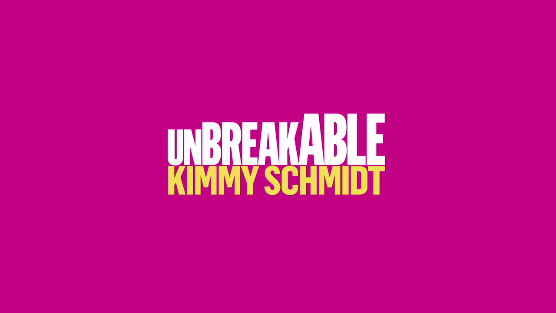
- Genre: Sitcom; Absurdist comedy
- Created by: Tina Fey; Robert Carlock
- Showrunners: Tina Fey; Robert Carlock
- Starring: Ellie Kemper; Tituss Burgess; Carol Kane; Jane Krakowski
- Opening theme: "Unbreakable" by Jeff Richmond
- Composers: Jeff Richmond; Schmoyoho (Note: While the theme song was written and composed by Jeff Richmond, Schmoyoho had composed a longer version for the show, with the help of Richmond via Netflix.)
- Country of origin: United States
- Original language: English
- No. of seasons: 4
- No. of episodes: 52 (list of episodes)

Production
- Executive producers: Tina Fey; Robert Carlock; Ellie Kemper; Jeff Richmond; Jack Burditt; David Miner; Sam Means
- Producers: Jerry Kupfer; Dara Schnapper
- Cinematography: John Inwood
- Editor: Ken Eluto
- Camera setup: Single-camera
- Running time: 22–53 minutes
- Production companies: Little Stranger, Inc.; Bevel Gears; 3 Arts Entertainment; Universal Television; Netflix Originals

Original release
- Network: Netflix
- Release: March 6, 2015 – January 25, 2019
- Release: May 12, 2020

Unbreakable Kimmy Schmidt is an American sitcom created by Tina Fey and Robert Carlock, starring Ellie Kemper in the title role. It premiered on March 6, 2015, on Netflix and ran for four seasons, ending on January 25, 2019. An interactive special premiered on May 12, 2020.

The series follows 29-year-old Kimmy Schmidt (Kemper) as she adjusts to life after being rescued from a doomsday cult in the fictional town of Durnsville, Indiana, where she and three other women were held captive by Reverend Richard Wayne Gary Wayne (Jon Hamm) for 15 years. Determined to be seen as something other than a victim and armed only with a positive attitude, she decides to restart her life by moving to New York City, where she quickly befriends her street-wise landlady Lillian Kaushtupper (Carol Kane), finds a roommate in struggling actor Titus Andromedon (Tituss Burgess), and gains a job as a nanny for melancholic and out-of-touch socialite Jacqueline Voorhees (Jane Krakowski).

Throughout its run, the series received critical acclaim, with critic Scott Meslow calling it "the first great sitcom of the streaming era". It received 20 Primetime Emmy Award nominations, including four nominations for Outstanding Comedy Series and a nomination for Outstanding Television Movie for the 2020 special Kimmy vs. the Reverend.

== Synopsis ==
Kimmy Schmidt (Ellie Kemper) was in eighth grade when she was kidnapped by Reverend Richard Wayne Gary Wayne (Jon Hamm). He held Kimmy and three other women captive for 15 years in an underground bunker and convinced them that a nuclear apocalypse had left them the sole survivors of humanity.

In the first season, the women are rescued, and go on to appear on the Today Show in New York City. After the show, Kimmy decides she doesn't want to return to Indiana or be seen as a victim, so she starts a new life in New York City. Roaming around the city, she comes across landlady Lillian Kaushtupper (Carol Kane), who offers Kimmy a chance to room with aspiring actor Titus Andromedon (Tituss Burgess) in her downstairs apartment. However, to get the apartment, Kimmy has to find a job. When she tries to get a job at a nearby candy store, she sees a boy stealing candy. She pursues him back to his home and encounters his mother, Jacqueline Voorhees (Jane Krakowski), a Manhattan trophy wife, who mistakes her for a nanny, and whom Kimmy mistakes as someone trapped in a cult. Jacqueline hires Kimmy as a nanny for her 10-year-old son. As Season 1 continues, Kimmy falls in love with Dong (Ki Hong Lee), a Vietnamese man from her G.E.D. class; encourages Jacqueline to leave her cheating husband; helps Titus rediscover his dreams of stardom; goes to court to testify against the Reverend, and discovers how the world has changed in the 15 years she was held captive.

In the second season, Kimmy is sick of working for Jacqueline and gets a job at a year-round Christmas store and then as an Uber driver. She tries to get over Dong, who enters a green card marriage with a much older G.E.D. student and is eventually deported. As Kimmy tries to move on, so do Titus and Jacqueline. Titus begins dating newly out construction worker Mikey Politano (Mike Carlsen) and Jacqueline attempts to adjust to life without a wealthy husband and returns to her Native American heritage, devoting herself to force the Washington Redskins to change their name. She begins dating socially awkward lawyer Russ Snyder (David Cross) after she realizes that his family, who despise him, own the Redskins. Kimmy reunites with Gretchen and Cyndee to save them from joining another cult and getting married on television, respectively. When Season 2 ends, Titus leaves to be a performer on a cruise and Lillian protests the invasion of hipsters in her neighborhood, while Kimmy makes amends with her mother (Lisa Kudrow) after advice from her therapist (Tina Fey) before receiving a phone call from the Reverend in prison, telling her that they need to get a divorce.

In the third season, Kimmy proceeds with the divorce from the Reverend but hits a snag when she learns that a devoted fan (guest star Laura Dern) wants to marry him. After getting her G.E.D., Kimmy decides to go to college. She happens into a rowing scholarship at Columbia University, where she is popular but fails academically. She forms a friendship with Perry (Daveed Diggs), a philosophy and religion transfer student who, like Kimmy, does not fit in with the rich, elitist Ivy League students. Titus returns from his stint on the cruise harboring a secret and, determined to come home to Mikey with money and a job, he records a novelty song called "Boobs in California" and auditions for Sesame Street. After being propositioned and sexually harassed by the puppet star of the series, Titus leaves and runs home to Mikey. Titus sees Mikey out with another man, and breaks up with him. Lillian is elected to the city council and attempts to block the construction of a supermarket chain for fear it will gentrify the neighborhood. She later starts a relationship with the owner of the chain (Peter Riegert). Meanwhile, Jacqueline and Russ marry and successfully execute their plan to force his family to change the name of the Redskins, but after Russ is run over by a car, he emerges from months in a body cast as a handsome heartthrob, earning his family's respect but turning his back on Jacqueline to gain their affection. After "Boobs in California" becomes a hit in Japan, Titus gets a mild burst of fame, which Jacqueline helps him negotiate. At the end of season three, Titus vows to win Mikey back from his new boyfriend, Jacqueline finds a new calling as Titus' agent, and Kimmy lands a job at a tech start-up.

In the fourth and final season, Kimmy is working at Giztoob, the tech company started by a former classmate at Columbia, and Jacqueline is representing Titus as his agent. Kimmy is horrified to discover Jacqueline's former boy toy Doug, a.k.a. DJ Fingablast, has become a men's rights activist and made a true crime documentary about the Reverend called Party Monster: Scratching the Surface. Outraged that the documentary sympathizes with the Reverend and paints Kimmy and the other Mole Women negatively, Kimmy writes a children's book that encourages boys to be kind. After acting in an anti-bullying performance for a middle school, Titus gets a job as director of the school play, pretends to write and star in a superhero television show called The Capist, starring Greg Kinnear, in an attempt to impress Mikey, and briefly joins the cast of Cats. Meanwhile, Lillian's boyfriend Artie dies and she is put in charge of his adult daughter's trust. An hour-long standalone episode separate from the main plot, "Sliding Van Doors", presents an alternate universe in which Kimmy is never kidnapped. The butterfly effect of this leads to Kimmy becoming an ambitious news anchor, Titus missing his audition for The Lion King and becoming a closeted movie star with his career managed by a cult run by Gretchen, Jacqueline marrying Mikey instead of Julian Voorhees, and Lillian running a Latin street gang. The series concludes with each of the main four characters finding success and purpose in new ventures, with Titus reuniting with Mikey and becoming a film star, Jacqueline finding both success and love with rival agent Eli (Zachary Quinto), Lillian becoming the new voice of the New York City Subway, and Kimmy's book becoming a huge success. The final scene of the series features Kimmy and her mother opening a roller coaster at the amusement park based on her book series, where a young boy tells Kimmy that her books make him feel safe.

The series was followed by an interactive sequel film, Unbreakable Kimmy Schmidt: Kimmy vs the Reverend, in which Kimmy, about to be married to British Prince Frederick (Daniel Radcliffe) realizes that Reverend Richard had a second bunker where he had trapped additional girls, and goes to West Virginia to rescue them and put her past behind her once and for all.

== Episodes ==
Season	Episodes		Originally released
1	13		March 6, 2015
2	13		April 15, 2016
3	13		May 19, 2017
4	12	6	May 30, 2018
4	12	6	January 25, 2019
Special			May 12, 2020

== Cast and characters ==
=== Main ===
- Ellie Kemper as Kimberly "Kimmy" Cougar Schmidt, the titular character. Armed with only unflagging optimism, a childlike sense of wonder and an eighth-grade education, she attempts to regain the life that was taken from her and navigate her way through the unfamiliar struggles of New York life.
- Tituss Burgess as Titus Andromedon (born Ronald Wilkerson), Kimmy's gay, flamboyant roommate and an aspiring actor and singer. Melodramatic and self-absorbed, Titus nevertheless cares deeply for, and is very protective of Kimmy. Despite his talent and ego, he is plagued by self-doubt after years of rejection in the business. Titus hails from Chickasaw County, Mississippi, and moved to New York City in 1998.
- Carol Kane as Lillian Kaushtupper, Kimmy and Titus' odd landlady. A proud born-and-bred New Yorker with a long, complex criminal history, she fights against the possible gentrification of her neighborhood (although it soon becomes clear that she hates any form of progress or technology). Despite her willingness to do anything to make a buck, she has a very big heart and will go out of her way to help her tenants.
- Jane Krakowski as Jacqueline White (formerly Voorhees; née Jackie Lynn White), a wealthy and insecure socialite who hires Kimmy as a nanny. Despite coming across as arrogant, condescending and out of touch, she is very fond of (and heavily reliant on) her new employee, who helps her gain perspective on her unhappy marriage. She is secretly of Lakota Native American descent and is passing for white. As the series progresses, she gradually reconnects with her family and her culture. She is the mother of Buckley Voorhees and the former step-mother of Xanthippe Lannister Voorhees. Her ex-husband is Julian Voorhees.

=== Recurring ===
- Sara Chase as Cyndee Pokorny, Kimmy's best friend from the cult.
- Lauren Adams as Gretchen Chalker, a willing member of the cult, who believes everything she was told.
- Sol Miranda as Donna Maria Nuñez, a cult member who pretends to not speak English during her time in the bunker, and is later revealed to be using the "Mole Woman" name to advertise her mole sauce.
- Jon Hamm as Reverend Richard Wayne Gary Wayne, the man who imprisoned Kimmy, Cyndee, Gretchen and Donna Maria in an underground bunker for fifteen years and led them to believe that they had survived the end of the world.
- Mike Carlsen as Mikey Politano, an Italian-American construction worker who questions his sexuality after hitting on Kimmy in season 1. In season 2, he starts dating Titus, and they have an on-again, off-again relationship for the remainder of the series.
- Dylan Gelula as Xanthippe ("Zan") Lannister Voorhees, the pretty, popular and bratty stepdaughter of Jacqueline, who is later revealed to be hiding her high achieving, 'good girl' personality. She is the older half-sister of Buckley Voorhees. After her father (Julian) divorces Jacqueline, she is sent to Connecticut to move back in with her mother, and only appears in one episode in season 2. She returns in season 3, attending Columbia University, where Kimmy starts college.
- Tanner Flood as Buckley Voorhees, Julian and Jacqueline's hyperactive, violent son. He is the younger half-brother of Xanthippe.
- Amy Sedaris as Mimi Kanassis, a rather dim-witted and annoying acquaintance of Jacqueline's who is desperate to regain social status after her divorce.
- James Monroe Iglehart as Coriolanus Burt, Titus' professional rival.
- Sheri Foster and Gil Birmingham (seasons 1–3) as Fern and Virgil White, Jacqueline's Lakota parents who hail from South Dakota.
- Mike Britt (seasons 1–2, 4) as Walter Bankston, a witness to the raid on the Bunker, whose remixed interview (set to music by The Gregory Brothers) serves as the show's theme song. Bankston is loosely based on Charles Ramsey, one of the rescuers of the captives of the Ariel Castro kidnappings.
- Ki Hong Lee (seasons 1–2) as Dong Nguyen, Kimmy's GED study buddy and love interest. An illegal immigrant from Vietnam, he spends much of the show hiding from the authorities under the name "Richard Pennsylvania". In Season 2, he was caught and later deported to Vietnam by the authorities.
- Adam Campbell (season 1) as Logan Beekman, a wealthy acquaintance of Julian's, who becomes intrigued by Kimmy after discovering she has no idea he is from one of New York's richest families. They briefly date before his jealousy over Dong spoils their romance.
- Andy Ridings (season 1) as Charles, Buckley's tutor, who has a crush on Kimmy.
- Susanna Guzman (season 1) as Vera, Jacqueline's housekeeper in season 1 and thus, Kimmy's co-worker. She believes Kimmy looks like "Wendy's Old Fashioned Hamburgers".
- Jason Kravits (season 1) as Gary Dubbin, Jacqueline's incompetent divorce lawyer.
- Brandon Jones (seasons 1–2) as Brandon Yeagley, Cyndee's childhood crush and later ex-fiancée.
- Julie Tice-Bubolz (seasons 1–3) as Yuko, a humanoid robot.
- John Ellison Conlee (seasons 1–2) as Rick, a cast member at Professor Dracula's, a Times Square theme restaurant where Titus works.
- Suzan Perry (seasons 1–2) as Sonja, an old and unusual student in Kimmy's GED class who marries Dong so that he can stay in the United States.
- Tim Blake Nelson (seasons 1, 4) as Randy Peterson, Kimmy's stepfather, a very incompetent state trooper who met, and later married, Kimmy's mother while searching for and failing to locate the missing Kimmy.
- Robin Rieger (seasons 1, 4) as Carla Tuesday, a Durnsville reporter who covers the Mole Women's rescue and the Reverend's trial.
- Tina Fey and Jerry Minor (season 1) as Marcia and Chris, incompetent prosecutors in the case against Richard Wayne. They are heavily implied to be Marcia Clark and Christopher Darden, the lead prosecutors in the O. J. Simpson murder case.
- Tina Fey (seasons 2–3) as Dr. Andrea Bayden, an alcoholic psychiatrist who begins treating Kimmy for the issues she developed from her experience in the bunker. She has a Jekyll-and-Hyde-type personality between her sober-daytime-self and her drunk-nighttime-self.
- Fred Armisen (seasons 2–3) as Robert "Bobby" Durst, a former flame of Lillian's. This character is a humorous representation of accused serial killer Robert Durst. Armisen returns in season 4 as "Robertina", Durst's sister, in the alternate universe.
- Anna Camp (seasons 2–3) as Deirdre Robespierre, a wealthy, intelligent and dangerously bored trophy wife who becomes Jacqueline's rival.
- David Cross/Billy Magnussen (seasons 2–3) as Russ Snyder, a rich pro-bono attorney who Jacqueline pursues and black sheep of his family. In season three, Russ is hospitalized after being run over by a car and his physical appearance is altered. He is played by Cross pre-accident and Magnussen post-accident.
- Harris Yulin (seasons 2-3) as Orson Snyder, Russ' father and owner of the Washington Redskins.
- Josh Charles (seasons 2–3) as Duke Snyder, Russ' favored brother, who tries to seduce Jacqueline.
- Doug Plaut (season 2) as Terry, Kimmy's boss at the year round Christmas Store.
- Chris Northrop (seasons 2-4) as Meth-Head Charlie, Kimmy and Titus' neighbor.
- Kenan Thompson (seasons 2–4) as Roland Peacock, Lillian's deceased husband.
- Derek Klena (seasons 2–4) as Doug / DJ Fingablast, a dog masseur and amateur DJ hired by Jacqueline to become her trophy boyfriend. He later makes the fictitious true crime documentary "Party Monster: Scratching the Surface" based on the Reverend.
- Lisa Kudrow (seasons 2, 4) as Lori-Ann Schmidt, Kimmy's absentee mother.
- Daveed Diggs (season 3) as Perry, a philosophy student at Columbia University and Kimmy's friend and love interest.
- Rachael Meyers (season 3) as Josie, a member of the Columbia University rowing team, roommate of Xanthippe and newfound friend to Kimmy.
- Chris Parnell as Junior (season 3, special), the son of one of the owners at the NFL Owners' Meeting and founder of the unsuccessful music festival "Festeroo"
- Peter Riegert (seasons 3–4) as Artie Goodman, an upscale grocery chain owner who initially engages in a feud with Lillian, before they begin a relationship.
- Noah Robbins (seasons 3–4) as Zach, Kimmy's classmate at Columbia and later boss at Giztoob.
- Bill Barretta (seasons 3–4) as Lonny Dufrene and Mr. Frumpus, a puppeteer who works on a fictionalized version of Sesame Street and his puppet character.
- Judah Friedlander (season 3) as Gordy, a conspiracy theorist musician who hires Titus to record the song "Boobs in California".
- Michael Benjamin Washington (season 3) as Ruben, a gay church choir director and Titus' love interest.
- Greg Kinnear (season 4) as himself, an actor who Jacqueline eventually represents.
- Bobby Moynihan (season 4) as Fran Dodd, a men's rights activist and bridal shop employee.
- Stephanie D'Abruzzo (season 4) as Jan, Kimmy's anthropomorphic backpack.
- Busy Philipps (season 4) as Sheba Goodman, Artie's irresponsible daughter.
- Elise Mestichelli (season 4) as C.H.E.R.Y./L., a humanoid robot and co-worker of Kimmy.

=== Guest ===
Season 1 (2015)
- Matt Lauer as himself, interviewing the Mole Women on The Today Show
- John McMartin as Grant, a war veteran friend of the Voorheeses
- Martin Short as Dr. Grant (pronounced "Franff"), Jacqueline's plastic surgeon
- Pat Battle as herself, providing a report on the news, advertising the play Titus wishes to audition for
- Richard Kind as Mr. Lefkovitz, Kimmy's GED teacher
- Mark Harelik as Julian Voorhees, Jacqueline's adulterous husband
- Nick Kroll as Tristafé, Jacqueline's instructor at Spirit Cycle, a parody of SoulCycle
- Kiernan Shipka as Kymmi, Kimmy's resentful half-sister
- Christine Ebersole as Helene, Xanthippe's biological mother
- Dean Norris as M. Le Loup, a coach who helps Titus pass as a straight man in order to improve his casting chances
- John Cullum as an actor on a fictitious 1938 musical film called "Daddy's Boy"
- Robert Osborne as himself, providing a short ending comment on the showing of a fictitious 1938 musical film called "Daddy's Boy"
- Horatio Sanz as Hector, a street performer mariachi who works with Titus in Times Square

Season 2 (2016)

- Zosia Mamet and Evan Jonigkeit as Sue and Bob Thompstein, a pair of hipsters from Austin, Texas
- Samuel Page as Keith Habersohl, a veteran who bonds with Kimmy over their PTSD
- Joshua Jackson as Purvis, a cashier at a local corner store
- Billy Eichner as himself, running into Kimmy while filming a segment of Billy on the Street
- Jeff Goldblum as Dr. Dave, a talk show therapist who encourages Cyndee to get married on the air
- Ice-T as himself, delivering the eulogy for an actor Titus knew
- Steve Buscemi, Patrick Stewart and Kelsey Grammer as Apple Watch voices
- Dean Winters and Will Arnett as Bunny and Kitty, titular stars of the fictional procedural show
- Judy Gold as Judy, the casting director who hires Titus for the cruise ship
- Richard Poe as Tucker Cobblepot, a wealthy older man whom Jacqueline tries to seduce for his money

Season 3 (2017)

- Laura Dern as Wendy Hebert, a woman who wants to marry the Reverend
- Becky Ann Baker as Stacey, a nurse at the hospital where Russ is treated
- Adrienne C. Moore as Black Cindy from Orange Is the New Black, whom Gretchen meets when she is sent off to prison
- Scott Adsit as Dale Bortz, an actor who impersonates Titus in a TV ad for the medication "Urethrex"
- Maya Rudolph as Dionne Warwick, the lead act for the cruise ship show Titus works on
- John Lutz as Ricky Earl, the stage manager of the cruise ship show Titus works on
- Ray Liotta as Paulie Fucillo, the owner of the gas station where Titus goes to poop
- Paula Pell as Bev, one of the owners at the NFL owners' meeting
- Rachel Dratch as Leonora and Dianne, Kimmy's philosophy professor at Columbia University and her wife (double role)
- Andrea Martin as Linda P., an HR representative from who Titus seeks advice
- Andy Cohen as himself, meeting with Jacqueline after she submits an audition tape for The Real Housewives of New York City
- Jim Gaffigan as Officer Krupke, a police officer who denies Kimmy's application to be a crossing guard
- Phyllis Somerville as Meemaw, Russ' grandmother
- David Garrison as Professor Walter, one of Kimmy's professors at Columbia

Season 4 (2018–19)

- Aidy Bryant as Tabby Bobatti, the Reverend's live-in girlfriend who did not know about the bunker
- Marsai Martin as Aisha, a student in the off-brand school production of Beauty and the Beast that Titus directs
- Juwan Crawley as Hudson, a talented boy who auditions for Titus' production of Beauty and the Beast
- Josh Cooke as Ethan Goodman, Artie's son
- Tariq Trotter as Damar Varnish, an interviewee in DJ Fingablast's documentary
- Jason Jones and Drew Gehling as Fred and Danford, attendees at the conference at which Kimmy represents Giztoob
- Paul Walter Hauser as Tripp Knob, Jacqueline's clueless subletter and later client
- Jon Bernthal as Ilan, a mysterious man who romantically pursues Titus
- Mark Linn-Baker and Joanna Gleason as Dave and Janice Hoffman, a couple to whom Kimmy forms an attachment as substitute parents
- Dan Byrd as Josh Hoffman, a boring coworker whom Kimmy agrees to date in order to get close to his parents
- Rob Huebel as Tad Frye, the host of a home renovation show who hires Titus to be his "reverse beard"
- Samantha Buck as Sophie Van Nuys, a talent agent who steals a client from Jacqueline
- Norm Lewis as Rumbleshanks, the lead role in a fictionalized version of Cats
- Ronan Farrow as himself, encouraging Titus to come forward with his story of sexual harassment by Mr. Frumpus
- Anders Holm as Bryan Pigslinger, Kimmy's college boyfriend and later husband in the alternate universe
- Soledad O'Brien as herself, a reporter in the alternate universe
- Zachary Quinto as Eli Rubin, a talent agent and Jacqueline's professional rival

Kimmy vs. the Reverend (2020)

- Daniel Radcliffe as Prince Frederick, Kimmy's fiancé and thirteenth in line to the throne of England
- Jack McBrayer as Sandy Parcell, a prison guard
- Heidi Gardner as Jenny, a wardrobe girl working on Titus' film set
- Zak Orth as Cody Santimonio, the writer of Titus' film
- Johnny Knoxville as C.J., a gas station attendant
- Josh Groban as himself, Kimmy's ex-boyfriend in a flashback
- Charlotte McKinney as herself, in Titus' dream
- Bowen Yang as Kim Jong-un
- Carol Kane as Fiona, Frederick's nanny

== Production ==
=== Development ===
The show was created by Tina Fey and Robert Carlock when NBC executives asked them to develop a show for Ellie Kemper. Fey said that they found an "innocence" about Kemper's face, but also noted a "strength" to it. One idea was for the show to center on Kemper's character waking up from a coma, but this idea was abandoned in favor of the cult survivor storyline. Kemper has stated that her inspiration for her portrayal of Schmidt was the recovery of Elizabeth Smart.

The show was initially under development for NBC under the title Tooken. NBC ultimately sold the series to Netflix. Fey said that this was partly due to NBC's "not feeling confident about watching comedies". Prior to the sale, NBC planned to air the series as either a mid-season replacement or as a summer series. It was sold to Netflix with a two-season order.

On June 13, 2017, it was renewed for a fourth and final season, with the first six episodes premiering on May 30, 2018. The second half was released on January 25, 2019. On May 8, 2019, it was announced that it would return with an interactive special, which premiered on May 12, 2020.

=== Casting ===
Casting announcements for the remaining roles were made in March 2014, with Tituss Burgess cast as Kimmy's roommate, Titus, and Carol Kane as Kimmy's and Titus's landlady, Lillian.

Shortly afterwards, Sara Chase was cast as Cyndee, Kimmy's closest friend during their years in the cult; and Lauren Adams as Gretchen, a 10-year member of the cult who believes everything she is told. Jane Krakowski was later cast as Jacqueline Voorhees, a wealthy Manhattanite who hires Kimmy as a nanny. Megan Dodds was originally cast before Krakowski replaced her.

=== Music ===
The show's theme song, "Unbreakable", was produced by The Gregory Brothers and written by Jeff Richmond. It is a tribute to The Gregory Brothers' YouTube show Songify the News – auto-tuned news interviews that became popular videos. It specifically parodies the mannerisms of Antoine Dodson in the "Bed Intruder Song". Richmond also wrote "Peeno Noir", a song performed by character Titus Andromedon during season 1, episode 6.

=== Artwork ===
Artwork for the show's opening sequence was produced by a team at Pentagram that included feminist artist Deva Pardue.

== Home video releases ==
Unbreakable Kimmy Schmidt DVD releases
Complete Series	DVD and Blu-ray release date
Complete Series	February 18, 2020

== Reception ==
The show has been widely acclaimed by television critics, who have praised the writing and cast.

=== Season 1 ===
On Rotten Tomatoes, the first season has a rating of 95%, based on 55 reviews, with an average rating of 7.5/10. The site's critical consensus reads, "Blessed with originality and a spot-on performance from Ellie Kemper, The Unbreakable Kimmy Schmidt is as odd as it is hilarious." On Metacritic, the first season has a score of 78 out of 100, based on 29 critics, indicating "generally favorable reviews".

Scott Meslow of The Week called the series "the first great sitcom of the streaming era", praising its wit, edge, and feminist tone. Brian Moylan of The Guardian noted that it is "the sort of show that could benefit from multiple viewings, because the jokes are so packed in you’re sure to miss something while laughing." TV Guide named it the "best new comedy of 2015". IGN reviewer Max Nicholson gave the first season an 8.3 out of 10 'Great' rating, saying "Tina Fey and Robert Carlock's Unbreakable Kimmy Schmidt is another winner in Netflix's original series catalog. Not only is it charming and funny, but it's unabashedly kooky, and Ellie Kemper nails the lead role."

The first season was nominated for seven Primetime Emmy Awards.

Category	Nominee(s)	Result
Outstanding Casting for a Comedy Series	Jennifer Euston and Meredith Tucker	Nominated
Outstanding Comedy Series	Unbreakable Kimmy Schmidt	Nominated
Outstanding Guest Actor in a Comedy Series	Jon Hamm as Reverend Richard Wayne Gary Wayne	Nominated
Outstanding Guest Actress in a Comedy Series	Tina Fey as Marcia	Nominated
Outstanding Stunt Coordination for a Comedy Series or Variety Program	Jill Brown	Nominated
Outstanding Supporting Actor in a Comedy Series	Tituss Burgess as Titus Andromedon	Nominated
Outstanding Supporting Actress in a Comedy Series	Jane Krakowski as Jacqueline Voorhees	Nominated

Some reviewers have criticized the show's portrayal of Native Americans, with Vulture referring to a prominent Native American subplot as "over-the-top," "sloppily marginalizing," "offensive," and "most frustrating because it doesn't serve a purpose, either narratively or comedically." BuzzFeed wrote that the show has a "major race problem" and cited the lack of a plurality of portrayals of Native Americans as the main issue with the subplot, stating that "the way Native Americans are represented on this show matters. It's not one representation among a cornucopia of representations; it's the single mainstream representation in years." The Daily Beast stated that when it comes to race, “especially in its portrayal of a key Vietnamese character, the show leaves much to be desired.”

In the wake of the controversy, Tina Fey responded: "I feel like we put so much effort into writing and crafting everything, they need to speak for themselves. There's a real culture of demanding apologies, and I'm opting out of that."

=== Season 2 ===
On Rotten Tomatoes, the second season holds a 100% approval rating, based on 24 reviews, with an average rating of 7.6/10. The site's critical consensus reads, "Not letting up in season two, Unbreakable Kimmy Schmidt is still odd in the best of ways, wonderfully building on its unique comedy stylings and brilliantly funny cast." On Metacritic, the second season has a score of 82 out of 100, based on 16 reviews, indicating "universal acclaim".

The second season was nominated for four Primetime Emmy Awards.

Category	Nominee(s)	Result
Outstanding Casting for a Comedy Series	Cindy Tolan	Nominated
Outstanding Comedy Series	Unbreakable Kimmy Schmidt	Nominated
Outstanding Lead Actress in a Comedy Series	Ellie Kemper as Kimmy Schmidt	Nominated
Outstanding Supporting Actor in a Comedy Series	Tituss Burgess as Titus Andromedon	Nominated

=== Season 3 ===
On Rotten Tomatoes, the third season holds a 97% approval rating, based on 29 reviews, with an average rating of 8.11/10. The site's critical consensus states: "Unbreakable Kimmy Schmidt continues to thrive with a comically agile cast, notable guest stars, and a forceful influx of funny." On Metacritic, the third season has a score of 78 out of 100, based on 12 reviews, indicating "generally favorable reviews".

The third season was nominated for five Primetime Emmy Awards.

Category	Nominee(s)	Result
Outstanding Comedy Series	Unbreakable Kimmy Schmidt	Nominated
Outstanding Lead Actress in a Comedy Series	Ellie Kemper as Kimmy Schmidt	Nominated
Outstanding Music and Lyrics	"Hell No"	Nominated
Outstanding Stunt Coordination for a Comedy Series or Variety Program	Jill Brown	Nominated
Outstanding Supporting Actor in a Comedy Series	Tituss Burgess as Titus Andromedon	Nominated

=== Season 4 ===
On Rotten Tomatoes, the fourth season holds a 94% approval rating, based on 32 reviews, with an average rating of 7.77/10. The site's critical consensus states: "Unbreakable Kimmy Schmidt ends with a final season that's as topical as it is cheerily irreverent." On Metacritic, the fourth season has a score of 85 out of 100, based on 6 reviews, indicating "universal acclaim".

The fourth season was nominated for two Primetime Emmy Awards.

Category	Nominee(s)	Result
Outstanding Comedy Series	Unbreakable Kimmy Schmidt	Nominated
Outstanding Supporting Actor in a Comedy Series	Tituss Burgess as Titus Andromedon	Nominated

=== Special ===
On Rotten Tomatoes, the Unbreakable Kimmy Schmidt: Kimmy vs. the Reverend special has an approval rating of 94%, based on 32 reviews, with an average rating of 7.81/10. The site's critical consensus reads: "Kimmy and company return as resilient as ever in a fun and fast paced special that makes excellent use of its interactive capabilities to produce maximum fabulosity."

The special was nominated for two Primetime Emmy Awards.

Category	Nominee(s)	Result
Outstanding Television Movie	Unbreakable Kimmy Schmidt: Kimmy vs. the Reverend	Nominated
Outstanding Supporting Actor in a Limited Series or Movie	Tituss Burgess as Titus Andromedon	Nominated
