= Jane Krakowski =

American actress (born 1968)

- Krakowski in 2026
- Born: Jane Krajkowski; October 11, 1968 (age 58); Parsippany, New Jersey, U.S.
- Education: Rutgers University, New Brunswick (BFA)
- Occupations: Actress; singer
- Years active: 1981–present
- Known for: 30 Rock; Ally McBeal; Unbreakable Kimmy Schmidt
- Partner(s): Robert Godley (2009–2013)
- Children: 1

Jane Krakowski (/krəˈkaʊski/; née Krajkowski; born October 11, 1968) is an American actress and singer. She starred as Jenna Maroney in the NBC satirical comedy series 30 Rock (2006–2013), for which she received four Primetime Emmy Award nominations for Outstanding Supporting Actress in a Comedy Series. Krakowski's other television roles have included Elaine Vassal in the Fox legal comedy-drama series Ally McBeal (1997–2002) and Jacqueline White in the Netflix comedy series Unbreakable Kimmy Schmidt (2015–2020). For the latter, she received another Primetime Emmy Award for Outstanding Supporting Actress in a Comedy Series nomination.

A trained singer, Krakowski has also worked on the stage. At age 18, she played the role of Dinah the Dining Car in the Broadway production of Starlight Express (1987). She has since won the Tony Award for Best Featured Actress in a Musical for the revival of Nine (2003). Other Tony-nominated roles include Grand Hotel (1989) and She Loves Me (2016). She received the Laurence Olivier Award for Best Actress in a Musical for her role in the West End revival of Guys and Dolls (2005). She received another nomination for her role in Here We Are (2025). In film roles, she has appeared as Cousin Vicki Johnson in National Lampoon’s Vacation (1983) and as Betty Rubble in The Flintstones in Viva Rock Vegas (2000).

== Early life ==
Jane Krakowski was born on October 11, 1968 and raised in Parsippany, New Jersey, the daughter of Edward A. Krajkowski (1938–2016), a chemical engineer employed at Picatinny Arsenal and former recording artist, and Barbara (née Benoit), a college theater instructor and producing artistic director for the Women's Theater Company. She has an older brother. Krakowski's father's family is Polish, and while she speaks very little Polish, her father and paternal grandparents were fluent.

Krakowski grew up immersed in the local theater scene as a result of her parents' involvement, saying in one interview: "Instead of hiring baby sitters, they brought me along with them." She took ballet lessons at age four, but later stopped because she had the wrong body shape, instead moving more towards Broadway dancing. She attended Parsippany High School and then the Professional Children's School in New York City and Mason Gross School of the Arts at Rutgers University, New Brunswick.

== Career ==
=== 1983–1997: early work and theater roles ===
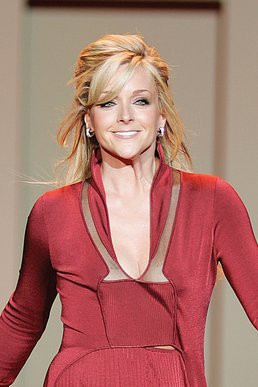
Krakowski at the 2007 Red Dress Collection for The Heart Truth

Following a 1981 television commercial at age 12 for the video game Solar Fox, Krakowski's first major role and feature film debut came at the age of 14, when she played Cousin Vicki Johnson in the 1983 road comedy National Lampoon's Vacation. Krakowski was originally cast in the 1983 horror film Sleepaway Camp, but dropped out just before filming began because she felt her character Judy's death scene with a curling iron was too violent. In 1984, she began appearing as Theresa Rebecca "T.R." Kendall in the NBC soap opera Search for Tomorrow, part of the NBC Daytime programming block; she continued the role until the show ended in 1986 and was nominated for Daytime Emmy Awards in 1986 and 1987. She also appeared in several episodes of the soap opera Another World in 1989.

At age 18, Krakowski originated the role of Dinah the Dining Car in the 1987 Broadway production of Starlight Express. She appeared in the 1989 Broadway musical Grand Hotel as the typist and would-be film star Flaemmchen, for which she was nominated for a Tony Award for Best Featured Actress in a Musical at the 44th Tony Awards. Her solo number, "I Want to Go to Hollywood," is included on the original cast recording. In 1995, she played the ditzy flight attendant April in the Roundabout Theater Company's revival of Company, followed by a starring role alongside Sarah Jessica Parker in the 1996 Broadway revival of Once Upon a Mattress.

=== 1997-2005: Ally McBeal and continued Broadway success ===
From 1997 to 2002, Krakowski played office assistant Elaine Vassal in the Fox comedy-drama series Ally McBeal; she received a nomination for the Golden Globe Award for Best Supporting Actress in a Series, Miniseries or Television Film at the 56th Golden Globe Awards in 1999. She portrayed Betty Rubble in the 2000 film The Flintstones in Viva Rock Vegas. She also appeared in the music video for The Chicks's song "Goodbye Earl" in 2000, and in a recurring role on the drama series Everwood in 2003.

At the 2000 American Comedy Awards, Krakowski won rave reviews when she performed a sexually charged musical tribute and love letter to Microsoft chairman Bill Gates. The following year, Krakowski appeared on the album Broadway Cares: Home for the Holidays, singing the song "Santa Baby". She also collaborated with Jim Brickman on the song "You" for Brickman's 2002 album Love Songs & Lullabies; the song became a hit on adult contemporary radio stations. Brickman and Krakowski later recorded a Christmas-themed alternate version of the song.

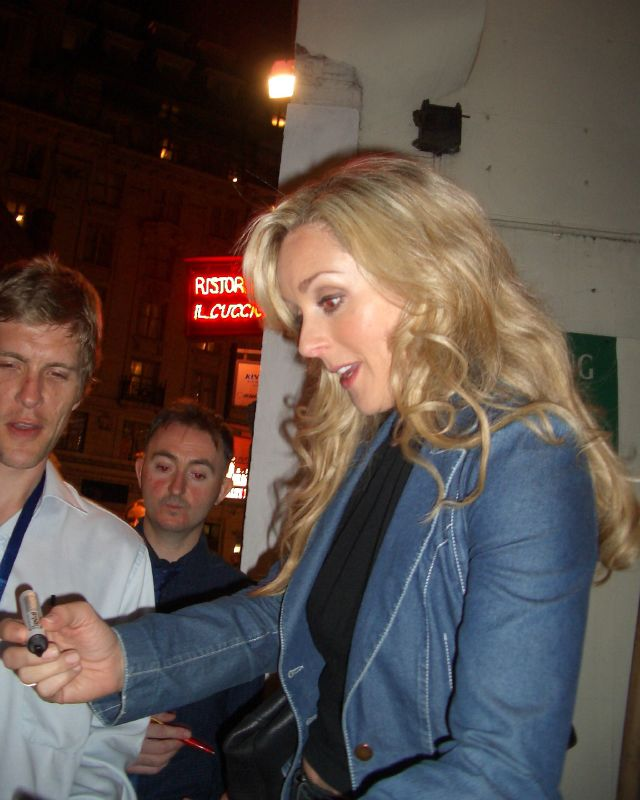
Krakowski signing autographs after a performance of Guys and Dolls

In 2003, she starred as Carla Albanese in the Broadway revival of Nine, for which she won the Tony Award for Best Featured Actress in a Musical at the 57th Tony Awards. Krakowski's performance was noted for a "breathtaking" aerial stunt she performed during the number "A Call from the Vatican". In 2005, Krakowski performed her own cabaret show, Better When It's Banned, at Lincoln Center, and starred as Miss Adelaide in Michael Grandage's West End revival of Guys and Dolls at London's Piccadilly Theatre, for which she received the 2006 Laurence Olivier Award for Best Actress in a Musical.

=== 2006–2020: Breakthrough with 30 Rock ===
From 2006 to 2013, Krakowski played the role of Jenna Maroney, a clueless and narcissistic actress, on the Tina Fey-created NBC comedy series 30 Rock. She was nominated for the Primetime Emmy Award for Outstanding Supporting Actress in a Comedy Series in 2009, 2010, 2011, and 2013.

Between 2007 and 2009, Krakowski performed in a workshop production of the musical Xanadu; a New York City Center production of Damn Yankees alongside Sean Hayes and Cheyenne Jackson; and a staged reading at Playwrights Horizons of the musical Mrs. Sharp.

Following 30 Rock's conclusion, Krakowski joined the cast of Fey's follow-up series, the Netflix comedy series Unbreakable Kimmy Schmidt, in the role of the condescending socialite Jacqueline White. Schmidt ran from 2015 to 2020 and garnered Krakowski her fifth Primetime Emmy Award nomination at the 67th Primetime Emmy Awards.

Krakowski starred as Ilona Ritter in the Roundabout Theatre Company's 2016 Broadway revival of Jerry Bock's and Sheldon Harnick's She Loves Me. For her performance, Krakowski won the 2016 Fred and Adele Astaire Award as Outstanding Female Dancer in a Broadway Show; the Outer Critics Circle Award for Outstanding Featured Actress in a Musical; and the Drama Desk Award for Outstanding Featured Actress in a Musical. She was also nominated for the Tony Award for Featured Actress in a Musical at the 70th Tony Awards.

=== 2021–present ===
Since 2021, Krakowski has hosted a Fox reboot of the 1950s game show Name That Tune, with former American Idol judge Randy Jackson as bandleader. Krakowski has said, "One of the reasons I wanted to do Name That Tune was to perform again in front of a live audience."

From 2021 to 2023, Krakowski portrayed The Countess/Bobbie Flanagan in the musical comedy television series Schmigadoon!, created by Cinco Paul and Ken Daurio.

In November 2021, Krakowski contracted a breakthrough case of COVID-19 and was forced to withdraw from NBC's Annie Live!, where she was to play Lily St. Regis.

Krakowski returned to the West End in 2025 for a 2-month run as Marianne Brink in Stephen Sondheim's final musical, Here We Are, earning a second nomination for the Laurence Olivier Award for Best Actress in a Musical.

From October 2025 to January 2026, she portrayed the role of Mary Todd Lincoln in the historical farce Oh, Mary!, written and originated by Cole Escola.

== Personal life ==
Krakowski became engaged to Robert Godley in 2009. They have a son, born in April 2011. The couple separated in 2013.

In January 2021, the Daily Mail alleged that Krakowski had a nine-month relationship with Mike Lindell, the inventor of My Pillow, between late 2019 and the summer of 2020. Both Krakowski and Lindell denied the allegation, and Lindell sued the Daily Mail for libel. The case was dismissed on the grounds that a "reasonable person" would not view anything in the Daily Mail article as defamatory.

== Filmography ==
=== Film ===
Film performances by Jane Krakowski
Year	Title	Role	Notes
1983	National Lampoon's Vacation	Cousin Vicki Johnson	
1987	Fatal Attraction	Christine	
1991	Stepping Out	Lynne	
1996	Mrs. Winterbourne	Christine	
1997	Hudson River Blues	Diane	
1998	Dance With Me	Patricia Black	
1999	Go	Irene Halverson	
2000	The Flintstones in Viva Rock Vegas	Betty O'Shale	
2002	Ice Age	Jennifer the Sloth	Voice
2003	Marci X	Lauren Farb	
2003	When Zachary Beaver Came to Town	Heather Wilson	
2004	Alfie	Dorie	
2005	Pretty Persuasion	Emily Klein	
2006	Open Season	Giselle	Voice
2007	Surf's Up	Sheila Limberfin	Voice, deleted scenes
2008	The Rocker	Carol	
2008	Kit Kittredge: An American Girl	Miss May Dooley	
2008	Open Season 2	Giselle	Voice
2009	Cirque du Freak: The Vampire's Assistant	Corma Limbs	
2014	Adult Beginners	Miss Jenn	
2014	Big Stone Gap	Sweet Sue Tinsley	
2015	Pixels	First Lady Jane Cooper	
2018	Henchmen	Jane	Voice
2020	The Willoughbys	Mother Willoughby	Voice
2021	My Little Pony: A New Generation	Queen Haven	Voice
2023	Your Christmas or Mine 2	Diane	
2026	The Man with the Bag		Completed
TBA	Nice Eggs †	Ellen	Post-production

=== Television ===
Television performances by Jane Krakowski
Year	Title	Role	Notes
1983	ABC Weekend Special	Lizzie Dodge	Episode: "Horatio Alger Updated: Frank and Fearless"
1984–1986	Search for Tomorrow	Theresa Rebecca "T.R." Kendall	Main cast (107 episodes)
1985	No Big Deal	Margaret	Television film
1989	Another World	Tonya	9 episodes
1989	When We Were Young	Linda Rosen	Television film
1991	Against the Law	Colleen Hanrahan	Episode: "Miss Mass"
1991	Women and Men 2: In Love There Are No Rules	Melba	Television film
1993	Alex Haley's Queen	Jane Jackson	2 episodes
1993	The Young Indiana Jones Chronicles	Dale Winter	Episode: "Young Indiana Jones and the Mystery of the Blues"
1994	Due South	Catherine Burns	Episode: "An Invitation to Romance"
1996	Early Edition	Dr. Handleman	Episode: "Baby"
1997–2002	Ally McBeal	Elaine Vassal	Main cast (112 episodes)
1998–1999	Mad TV	Herself	2 episodes
1999	Great Performances	Herself	Episode: "The Rodgers & Hart Story: Thou Swell, Thou Witty"
1999	Snoops	Herself	Episode: "Higher Calling"
2000–2005	CatDog	Sasquatch / Pussycat Catfield	Voice, 2 episodes
2002	Just a Walk in the Park	Rachel Morgan	Television film
2002–2003	Everwood	Dr. Gretchen Trott	2 episodes
2002–2004	Rocket Power	Breezy	Voice, 2 episodes
2004	Law & Order: Special Victims Unit	Emma Spevak	Episode: "Bound"
2004	Taste	Samantha Neal	Television pilot
2004	Hack	Mrs. Smith	Episode: "One for My Baby"
2004	A Christmas Carol	Ghost of Christmas Past / Lamplighter	Television film
2005	Mom at Sixteen	Donna Cooper	Television film
2006	Sex, Love, Power, and Politics	Sloan	Television pilot
2006–2013	30 Rock	Jenna Maroney	Main cast (138 episodes)
2008	A Muppets Christmas: Letters to Santa	Claire's Mom	Television film
2013	The Simpsons	Zhenya	Voice, episode: "The Fabulous Faker Boy"
2014	American Dad!	Charlotte	Voice, episode: "Roger Passes the Bar"
2014	Dead Boss	Helen Stephens	Television pilot
2014–2017	Modern Family	Dr. Donna Duncan	3 episodes
2015	Younger	Annabelle Bancroft	Episode: "Shedonism"
2015	Saturday Night Live	Jenna Maroney	Episode: "Tracy Morgan/Demi Lovato"
2015–2019	Unbreakable Kimmy Schmidt	Jacqueline White	Main cast (51 episodes)
2016	Robot Chicken	Various	Episode: "Yogurt in a Bag"
2016	She Loves Me	Ilona Ritter	Television film
2017	Sofia the First	Sizzle	Voice, episode: "The Royal Dragon"
2017	Difficult People	Lizzie McCormick	Episode: "Cindarestylox"
2017	BoJack Horseman	Honey Sugarman	Voice, episode: "The Old Sugarman Place"
2017	Tangled: The Series	Willow	Voice, episode: "The Way of the Willow"
2017	A Christmas Story Live!	Miss Shields	Television special
2017–2020	At Home with Amy Sedaris	Herself / Beverly	2 episodes
2017–2020	Match Game	Herself (panelist)	11 episodes
2018	Drunk History	Sheralee	Episode: "Sex"
2019	Last Week Tonight with John Oliver	Spokesperson	Episode: "June 2, 2019"
2019–2021	Dickinson	Emily Norcross Dickinson	Main cast (30 episodes)
2020	AJ and the Queen	Beth Barnes Beagle	Episode: "Fort Worth"
2020	Curb Your Enthusiasm	Veronica	Episode: "The Ugly Section"
2020	Unbreakable Kimmy Schmidt: Kimmy vs the Reverend	Jacqueline White	Television film
2020	30 Rock: A One-Time Special	Jenna Maroney	Television special
2020	RuPaul's Drag Race: All Stars	Herself	Episode: "Stand-Up Smackdown"
2021–2022	Ziwe	Mom / Jane	2 episodes
2021–2023	Schmigadoon!	The Countess / Bobbie Flanagan	Main cast (10 episodes)
2021–present	Name That Tune	Herself	Host (49 episodes)
2024	Elsbeth	Joann Lenox	Episode: "A Classic New York Character"
2025	Brilliant Minds	Arianna Burnett	Episode: "Lady Liberty"
2026	Life, Larry and the Pursuit of Unhappiness	Edith	Episode 6 ("Buzz")

=== Music videos ===
Music video performances by Jane Krakowski
Year	Song	Artist	Role
2000	"Goodbye Earl"	The Chicks	Wanda
2019	"Afterlife" (For Your Consideration Version)	Hailee Steinfeld	Herself
2022	"Surrender My Heart"	Carly Rae Jepsen	Herself

=== Theater ===
Stage performances by Jane Krakowski
Year	Title	Role	Venue	Notes
1978	The Sound of Music	Marta von Trapp	Various	Regional Tour
1981	A Little Night Music	Fredrika Armfeldt	Theatre at St. Peter's Church	Off-Off-Broadway
1987	Starlight Express	Dinah the Dining Car	Gershwin Theatre	Broadway
1989	Grand Hotel	Frieda "Flaemmchen" Flamm	Martin Beck Theatre	Broadway
1991	1776	Martha Jefferson	Williamstown Theatre Festival	Regional
1993	Face Value	Jessica Ryan	Cort Theatre	Broadway
1995	Company	April	Criterion Center Stage Right	Broadway
1996	One Touch of Venus	Gloria Kramer	New York City Center	Off-Broadway
1996	Tartuffe	Mariane	Circle in the Square Theatre	Broadway
1996	Once Upon a Mattress	Lady Larken	Broadhurst Theatre	Broadway
2000	Mack & Mabel	Mabel Normand	UCLA	LA Concert
2002	Funny Girl	Fanny Brice	New Amsterdam Theatre	Broadway Concert
2003	Nine	Carla Albanese	Eugene O'Neill Theatre	Broadway
2005	Guys and Dolls	Adelaide	Piccadilly Theatre	West End
2007	Xanadu	Clio / Kira	Workshop	Reading
2008	Damn Yankees	Lola	New York City Center	Encores!
2009	Mrs. Sharp	Mrs. Sharp	Workshop	Reading
2011	She Loves Me	Ilona Ritter	Stephen Sondheim Theatre	Broadway Concert
2016	She Loves Me	Ilona Ritter	Studio 54	Broadway
2018	Beauty and the Beast	Mrs. Potts	Hollywood Bowl	Los Angeles
2024	Gutenberg! The Musical!	The Producer (one night cameo)	James Earl Jones Theatre	Broadway
2024	Shit. Meet. Fan.	Eve	MCC Theater	Off-Broadway
2025	Here We Are	Marianne Brink	Lyttelton Theatre	London
2025–2026	Oh, Mary!	Mary Todd Lincoln	Lyceum Theatre	Broadway

== Discography ==
Krakowski released her debut solo album on July 15, 2010. It is an album of cover versions called Laziest Gal in Town. It released on DRG Records.

Selected recordings include:

- 1992: Grand Hotel, Studio Cast Recording (mostly original Broadway cast)
- 1995: Company, Broadway revival cast recording
- 1997: Once Upon a Mattress, Broadway revival cast recording
- 1997: Sondheim at the Movies (singing the Academy Award-winning song "Sooner or Later" from Dick Tracy)
- 1998: The Burt Bacharach Album
- 2002: A Broadway Valentine
- 2003: Nine, Broadway revival cast recording
- 2004: A Christmas Carol, television cast recording
- 2010: The Laziest Gal in Town, solo album
- 2016: She Loves Me, Broadway revival cast recording

== Awards and nominations ==
=== Actor Awards ===
Year	Award	Nominated work	Result
1998	Outstanding Performance by an Ensemble in a Comedy Series	Ally McBeal	Nominated
1999	Outstanding Performance by an Ensemble in a Comedy Series	Ally McBeal	Won
2000	Outstanding Performance by an Ensemble in a Comedy Series	Ally McBeal	Nominated
2001	Outstanding Performance by an Ensemble in a Comedy Series	Ally McBeal	Nominated
2008	Outstanding Performance by an Ensemble in a Comedy Series	30 Rock	Nominated
2009	Outstanding Performance by an Ensemble in a Comedy Series	30 Rock	Won
2010	Outstanding Performance by an Ensemble in a Comedy Series	30 Rock	Nominated
2011	Outstanding Performance by an Ensemble in a Comedy Series	30 Rock	Nominated
2012	Outstanding Performance by an Ensemble in a Comedy Series	30 Rock	Nominated
2013	Outstanding Performance by an Ensemble in a Comedy Series	30 Rock	Nominated
2014	Outstanding Performance by an Ensemble in a Comedy Series	30 Rock	Nominated

=== Critics' Choice Awards ===
Year	Award	Nominated work	Result
2011	Best Supporting Actress in a Comedy Series	30 Rock	Nominated
2016	Best Supporting Actress in a Comedy Series	Unbreakable Kimmy Schmidt	Won

=== Emmy Awards ===
Year	Award	Nominated work	Result
Daytime Emmy Awards
1986	Outstanding Ingenue in a Daytime Drama Series	Search for Tomorrow	Nominated
1987	Outstanding Ingenue in a Daytime Drama Series	Search for Tomorrow	Nominated
Primetime Emmy Awards
2009	Outstanding Supporting Actress in a Comedy Series	30 Rock	Nominated
2010	Outstanding Supporting Actress in a Comedy Series	30 Rock	Nominated
2011	Outstanding Supporting Actress in a Comedy Series	30 Rock	Nominated
2013	Outstanding Supporting Actress in a Comedy Series	30 Rock	Nominated
2015	Outstanding Supporting Actress in a Comedy Series	Unbreakable Kimmy Schmidt	Nominated

=== Golden Globe Awards ===
Year	Award	Nominated work	Result
1999	Best Supporting Actress – Series, Miniseries or Television Film	Ally McBeal	Nominated

=== Laurence Olivier Awards ===
Year	Award	Nominated work	Result
2006	Best Actress in a Musical	Guys and Dolls	Won
2026	Best Actress in a Musical	Here We Are	Nominated

=== Tony Awards ===
Year	Award	Nominated work	Result
1990	Best Featured Actress in a Musical	Grand Hotel	Nominated
2003	Best Featured Actress in a Musical	Nine	Won
2016	Best Featured Actress in a Musical	She Loves Me	Nominated

=== Miscellaneous awards and honors ===
Year	Organization	Award	Nominated work	Result
1990	Drama Desk Award	Outstanding Featured Actress in a Musical	Grand Hotel	Nominated
2001	Golden Satellite Awards	Best Actress – Television Series Musical or Comedy	Ally McBeal	Nominated
2003	Drama Desk Award	Outstanding Featured Actress in a Musical	Nine	Won
2016	Drama Desk Award	Outstanding Featured Actress in a Musical	She Loves Me	Won
2016	Outer Critics Circle Award	Outstanding Featured Actress in a Musical	She Loves Me	Won
2016	Astaire Award	Outstanding Female Dancer in a Broadway Show	She Loves Me	Won
2021	1st Critics' Choice Super Awards	Best Villain in a Movie	The Willoughbys	Nominated
2026	Broadway.com Audience Choice Awards	Favorite Replacement (Female)	Oh, Mary!	Pending
