= List of Pink Panther video games =

Following are video games based on the Pink Panther:

- The Pink Panther (1983), a hand-held LCD game from Tiger Electronics.
- Pink Panther (video game), 1988 video game.
- Pink Goes to Hollywood, 1993 video game.
- The Pink Panther: Passport to Peril, 1996 video game.
- The Pink Panther: Hokus Pokus Pink, 1997 video game.
- Pink Panther: Pinkadelic Pursuit, 2002 video game.
- Pink Panther Jewel Heist, 2015 arcade video game.
- Pink Panther's Epic Adventure (2015) for iOS and Android.
