= Professional Tennis Players Association =

Union for professional tennis players

PTPA
- Professional Tennis Players Association
- Founded: 2019; 7 years ago
- Location: Canada
- Key people: Vasek Pospisil, Co-Founder; Ahmad Nassar, Executive Director
- Website: ptpaplayers.com

The Professional Tennis Players Association (PTPA) is an association of male and female tennis players founded by the players Vasek Pospisil and Novak Djokovic (the latter of whom has since left the organisation). The group represents singles players in the top 500 and doubles players in the top 200 of the ATP rankings and WTA rankings.

It was founded by players who had previously been members of the Association of Tennis Professionals Players Council. Members of the PTPA include Vasek Pospisil. The PTPA is governed by a board of trustees of nine members, to be elected annually.

As the ATP is the representative of both players and tournaments, a greater degree of autonomy for players is sought by the members of the PTPA. According to proponents of the new association, the current structure makes having decisions in the best interests of the players difficult, given the conflicting and complex interests of tournaments, Grand Slam bodies and the International Tennis Federation (ITF). The PTPA said in a document that the goal of their organization was "not to replace" the ATP but to "provide players with a self-governance structure that is independent from the ATP and is directly responsive to player-members needs and concerns".

== History ==
The concept for the PTPA began in 2019, when Vasek Pospisil and Novak Djokovic found they shared a perception of shortcomings on how the ATP protected the interest of its players.

Across 2020, they aimed to form and consolidate a movement, and it was formally founded as a non-profit in Canada in 2021, with the aim to "create transparency and fairness throughout decision-making in professional tennis", with membership being open to both men and women ranked in the top 350 in singles and/or top 150 in doubles.

In 2025 they launched the Athlete Counsel & Equity (ACE) Program, an initiative to guarantee high level legal defense for players, independently of their income, accused of having violated the anti-doping rules, following the disparity of cases involving high and low profile players during 2024. On March 18, a lawsuit was brought against the major tennis governing bodies (ATP, WTA, ITF and ITIA) seeking better treatment which includes a reduction in tournaments players are required to compete in during the calendar year to advance in the rankings race, forcing players to compete virtually year-round increasing the risk of injury as well as physical wear and tear with only a month off, and fair compensation for their talent through equitable revenue sharing based on attendance (which in effect suggests an increase in pay) along with other grievances. The governing bodies reject the accusations alleged in the suit.

=== Launch ===
The initial announcement and launch of the PTPA was done at the US Open on August 29, 2020. The announcement was posted on Vasek Pospisil's Twitter account and included a picture of the members standing on the court in masks with the caption, "After today's successful meeting, we are excited to announce the beginning of the Professional Tennis Players Association (PTPA). The first player only association in tennis since 1972. #PTPA". After the initial launch there was not much movement, however on June 22, 2021 the PTPA released a formal press release on their official Twitter account announcing their advisory board and public communications firm, ANACHEL Communications Inc., as well as their website and social channels. They also launched their own website, www.ptpaplayers.com, which includes their mission and value statements, list of advisory board members, player stories, and an FAQ page to answer all questions those may have about the association. The official launch of the PTPA was concluded with a global press conferencethat included the founders of the association, Vasek Pospisil and Novak Djokovic, the executive director of the PTPA, Adam Larry, and CEO of ANACHEL Communications Inc., Carrie Gerlach Cecil. The press conference was opened to all tennis writers around the world and was livestreamed on YouTube for all to see.

== Response ==
Milos Raonic stated his intention to join the group: Raonic has expressed his displeasure with Andrea Gaudenzi, the chairman of the ATP on the body's handling of the COVID crisis. Speaking after his semifinal win at the Cincinnati Masters held in New York due to the pandemic, Raonic said:

"Players have had plenty of time to think and reflect and take a look at certain parts which they may not be happy with and discuss...A lot of us were kept in the dark by our leadership for six months. We were disappointed with many things. I voiced my opinion on many things, such as ... executives in other sports taking pay cuts to support us. As tennis players, we weren’t making a dime for months and months. ... Lower guys weren’t making a dime," Raonic said. "But our executives were staying home and didn’t feel it necessary to take any pay cuts. I pushed for that on every single phone call we had".

Gaudenzi was critical of the PTPA and said that "You have what other athletes in other sports would strive for — a seat at the boardroom table. That is what players fought for in the creation of the ATP Tour...It makes no sense why you would be better served by shifting your role from the inside to the outside of the governance structure".

Pospisil said in a statement that it was "very difficult, if not impossible, to have any significant impact on any major decisions made by our tour" and that "Our voices will finally be heard and we will soon have an impact on decisions that affect our lives and livelihoods".

In response, the ATP, the WTA, the four Grand Slam tournaments and the ITF released a statement in support of the ATP and said that "It is a time for even greater collaboration, not division; a time to consider and act in the best interests of the sport, now and for the future...When we work together, we are a stronger sport". The PTPA has drawn the opposition of players including Rafael Nadal and Roger Federer, the former writing on Twitter: "It is time for unity, not for separation. These are moments where big things can be achieved as long as the world of tennis is united". Andy Murray meanwhile argued that while he is "not totally against a player union", the WTA should be on its board and the current ATP management "should be given some time to implement their vision".

This is not the first time that professional tennis players have called for a players' only union or body. Former world number 1, Andy Roddick, tweeted on 29 August in response to the news, "It's almost like someone should have said something a decade ago". Roddick has called for a players union as far back as 2011.

In November 2020, after a refusal of the ATP to allow Djokovic and Pospisil to return to the ATP player council, they were said to have been nominated by their peers, Pospisil gave an interview to tennis.com podcast, to clarify why they accepted their nomination, and argued further about the need for the new association:

"We basically don't have any information and the tournaments don't need to provide anything and don't need to be transparent at all," he says. "And that's not a business partnership. And especially when we're the product, where people come in and pay money to watch the players play. It's nothing confrontational. We're not here to be confrontational at all."

== Support ==
Support of the PTPA has been widespread since the launch by both current and former players around the globe. A year after its foundation, it had over 500 members.

American tennis players John Isner and Ryan Harrison have voiced their support on Twitter and have identified as members of the association. Top 30 players such as Hubert Hurkacz, Reilly Opelka, and Pablo Carreno Busta have done the same.

Support from former players in the tennis world stems from Paul McNamee, Mats Wilander, and Patrick McEnroe. Denis Shapovalov has also voiced his support of the association.

== Leadership and Player Executive Committee ==
In August 2022, the PTPA announced former CEO of OneTeam Partners, Ahmad Nassar, as its Executive Director.

In January 2023, the following players were announced to be part of the association's inaugural Player Executive Committee:

- Paula Badosa (Spain), winner of 3 WTA titles and No. 2 ranked player in singles
- Novak Djokovic (Serbia), winner of 24 major titles and No. 1 ranked player in singles
- Hubert Hurkacz (Poland), winner of 5 ATP titles and No. 9 ranked player in singles
- John Isner (USA), winner of 16 ATP titles and No. 8 ranked player in singles
- Ons Jabeur (Tunisia), winner of 3 WTA singles titles and No. 2 ranked player
- Bethanie Mattek-Sands (USA), winner of 9 major titles and No. 1 ranked player in doubles
- Vasek Pospisil (Canada), winner of 1 major title and No. 4 ranked player in doubles
- Zheng Saisai (China), winner of 1 WTA title and No. 34 ranked player in singles
