= Alih Jey =

Dominican Republic musician

- Also known as: Alih Jey
- Born: Alih Jey de Peña Jiménez; May 5, 1984 (age 42)
- Origin: Santo Domingo, Dominican Republic
- Genres: Latin pop, pop rock
- Occupations: Singer-songwriter, musician
- Instruments: Guitar, keyboards, vocals
- Years active: 2001–present
- Label: Universal Geffen

Alih Jey (born May 5, 1984) is a Dominican rock music singer and songwriter.

== Biography ==
She was born as Alih Jey de Peña Jiménez. Her family is well known in the Dominican show business industry: her father, Anibal de Peña, and her mother, Alida Iluminada Jiménez, are well known musicians there as well. Alih Jey demonstrated from an early age that she wanted to follow in her parents' footsteps.

At fourteen, she began to compose songs, which she would later record. At seventeen, she was signed by the Latin American division of Universal Music. Alih Jey released her debut album, Alih Jey, in 2001. Her first single, "It's ok", became an instant hit. Her first album was bilingual, as she is fluent in English apart from her native Spanish language.

Her second album Gotas De Piel was released to great critical acclaim in 2005. Her hit "Muñequita Tuya" was quickly put on high rotation in Latin music radio stations in the US. Other songs in her album like "Vino en Tu Bar" solidified her as a force to be reckoned with. During this time, she also collaborated on many projects as a songwriter, placing songs on several other singers' albums as well.

In 2005, Alih Jey toured alongside Mexican star Paulina Rubio during Rubio's Pau-Latina tour across the United States. Coincidentally, the tour ended in Alih Jey's homeland, Dominican Republic.

In 2006, she severed ties with record label Universal Music Latino and proceeded to work on a new independent record, Necia, released the following year.

In September 2008, Necia garnered a Latin Grammy nomination for Best Solo Rock Album.

She has played and toured many times with Miami local artist Jorges.

She also sang the theme song to the 2011 show Suburgatory called "Pleasant Nightmare".
