= Splitting Up Together =

American comedy television series

- Genre: Sitcom
- Based on: Bedre skilt end aldrig by Mette Heeno
- Developed by: Emily Kapnek
- Starring: Jenna Fischer; Oliver Hudson; Bobby Lee; Diane Farr; Lindsay Price; Olivia Keville; Van Crosby; Sander Thomas
- Opening theme: "Everything's Okay" by Lenka
- Composer: Jared Faber
- Country of origin: United States
- Original language: English
- No. of seasons: 2
- No. of episodes: 26

Production
- Executive producers: Mette Heeno; Mie Andreasen; Hella Joof; Jeff Kleeman; Dean Holland; Ellen DeGeneres; Emily Kapnek
- Producers: Marlis Pujol; Scott Sites; Rachel Abarbanell
- Cinematography: John Tanzer
- Camera setup: Single-camera
- Running time: 22 minutes
- Production companies: Piece of Pie Productions; A Very Good Production; Warner Bros. Television

Original release
- Network: ABC
- Release: March 27, 2018 – April 9, 2019

Splitting Up Together is an American sitcom developed by Emily Kapnek that aired on ABC from March 27, 2018, to April 9, 2019. The series stars Jenna Fischer, Oliver Hudson, Bobby Lee, Diane Farr, Lindsay Price, Olivia Keville, Van Crosby, and Sander Thomas.

On May 10, 2019, ABC cancelled the series after two seasons.

== Premise ==
The series chronicles what happens when a couple's marriage is suddenly reignited by their divorce. The couple has three children who live in the house with one parent on alternating weeks while the other parent lives as a single person who stays in the garage apartment in the back of the house. The garage-dwelling "single" partner is free to date while having no responsibilities in the house or for the children. The "parent" partner is free to preside over the house and family as they deem best. Each week the parents learn a little more about what it is they are lacking in the parenting and "romantic" parts of their lives, and in doing so become better parents and better romantic partners. Often the insight they gain allows them to see why their spouse felt unhappy in the marriage; thus helping them to improve as a person. This increasingly improved person they become also becomes slightly more alluring to their ex-spouse making their complete separation seem less likely.

== Cast ==
=== Main ===
- Jenna Fischer as Lena
- Oliver Hudson as Martin
- Bobby Lee as Arthur
- Diane Farr as Maya
- Lindsay Price as Camille
- Olivia Keville as Mae
- Van Crosby as Mason
- Sander Thomas as Milo

=== Recurring ===
- Geoff Pierson as Henry
- Trent Garrett as Wes
- Monica Barbaro as Lisa Apple
- Kelsey Chow as Charlotte

=== Notable guest stars ===
- Fred Armisen as Dr. Rydakto (episode: "Letting Ghost")
- Rowan Blanchard as China
- Angela Kinsey as Jeannie Johnson (episode: "We Need to Talk About Karen")

== Production ==
=== Development ===
On August 29, 2016, it was announced that ABC had picked up Splitting Up Together as a put pilot, a single-camera comedy series. Emily Kapnek, Ellen DeGeneres, Jeff Kleeman, Mett Heeno, Hella Joof, and Mia Andreasen serve as executive producers. On February 1, 2017, it was announced that ABC had officially ordered a pilot for the series. On April 5, 2017, it was revealed that the series would be a production of Warner Bros. Television. On May 12, 2017, it was announced that ABC had given Splitting Up Together a series order. On January 8, 2018, it was announced that the series would premiere on March 27, 2018. On May 11, 2018, it was announced that ABC had renewed the series for a second season. On July 24, 2018, it was announced that the second season would premiere on October 16, 2018. On October 22, 2018, it was announced that ABC had ordered three additional episodes for the second season. On November 7, 2018, it was announced that the series had received a full-season order for its second season.

=== Casting ===
On February 28, 2017, it was announced that Jenna Fischer was cast in the series. On March 1, 2017, it was announced that Oliver Hudson was cast in the series. On March 6, 2017, it was announced that Diane Farr was cast in the series. On May 12, 2017, it was announced that Olivia Keville, Van Crosby, Sanders Combs, Bobby Lee, and Lindsay Price were cast in the series. On November 16, 2017, it was announced that Geoff Pierson would recur in the series. On August 28, 2018, it was announced that Costa Ronin would be joining the series. On September 28, 2018, it was announced that Angela Kinsey would appear in an episode of the series. On October 10, 2018, it was announced that Ali Larter would recur in the second season.

=== Filming ===
The family home, and the couple's inability to sell it at the time of the divorce is central to the series. It is a Southern California craftsman style home, is featured in the title credits and in a number of episodes. The property's actual interior was utilized in the pilot. However, most production occurs in a replica of that interior on a soundstage at the Warner Bros. Studio in Burbank.

== Episodes ==
=== Series overview ===
| Season | Episodes | Originally released | |
| Season | Episodes | First released | Last released |
|---|---|---|---|
| 1 | 8 | March 27, 2018 | May 22, 2018 |
| 2 | 18 | October 16, 2018 | April 9, 2019 |

=== Season 1 (2018) ===
| No. overall | No. in season | Title | Directed by | Written by | Original release date | Prod. code | U.S. viewers (millions) |
|---|---|---|---|---|---|---|---|
| 1 | 1 | "Pilot" | Dean Holland | Emily Kapnek | March 27, 2018 | T11.10115 | 6.96 |
Guest stars: Geoff Pierson as Henry, Lucas Near-Verbrugghe as Dr. Kasper, Kelsey Asbille as Charlotte
| 2 | 2 | "Devil May Care" | Dean Holland | Emily Kapnek | April 3, 2018 | T12.15852 | 4.83 |
Guest stars: Trent Garrett as Wes, Lucas Near-Verbrugghe as Dr. Kasper
| 3 | 3 | "Street Meat" | Dean Holland | Brian Rubenstein | April 10, 2018 | T12.15853 | 4.13 |
Guest stars: Trent Garrett as Wes, Kelsey Asbille as Charlotte
| 4 | 4 | "Soups Jealous" | Helen Hunt | Brian Gallivan | April 17, 2018 | T12.15854 | 3.62 |
Guest stars: Trent Garrett as Wes, Alice Lee as Grace
| 5 | 5 | "Nevertheless... She Went Clubbing" | Dean Holland | Neel Shah | May 1, 2018 | T12.15855 | 3.80 |
Guest stars: Geoff Pierson as Henry, Monica Barbaro as Lisa Apple, Finesse Mitchell as Cy
| 6 | 6 | "Letting Ghost" | Jay Karas | Emma Barrie | May 8, 2018 | T12.15856 | 3.53 |
Special guest star: Fred Armisen as Dr. Rydakto Guest stars: Monica Barbaro as Lisa Apple, Trent Garrett as Wes, Patty Guggenheim as Meegan
| 7 | 7 | "Star of Milo" | Morgan Sackett | Ally Israelson | May 15, 2018 | T12.15857 | 3.64 |
Guest stars: Geoff Pierson as Henry, Monica Barbaro as Lisa Apple, Travis Schuldt as Frank
| 8 | 8 | "Heat Wave" | Dean Holland | Emily Kapnek | May 22, 2018 | T12.15858 | 4.02 |
Guest stars: Geoff Pierson as Henry, Monica Barbaro as Lisa Apple

=== Season 2 (2018–19) ===
| No. overall | No. in season | Title | Directed by | Written by | Original release date | Prod. code | U.S. viewers (millions) |
|---|---|---|---|---|---|---|---|
| 9 | 1 | "Sign Language" | Dean Holland | Emily Kapnek | October 16, 2018 | T12.16151 | 3.29 |
Guest stars: Geoff Pierson as Henry, Monica Barbaro as Lisa Apple, Travis Schuldt as Frank
| 10 | 2 | "Asking for a Friend" | Michael Engler | Sierra Teller Ornelas | October 23, 2018 | T12.16152 | 2.90 |
Guest stars: Monica Barbaro as Lisa Apple, Travis Schuldt as Frank, Marc Evan Jackson as Gene, Valee as himself
| 11 | 3 | "We Need to Talk About Karen" | Dean Holland | Owen Ellickson | October 30, 2018 | T12.16153 | 3.28 |
Special guest star: Angela Kinsey as Jeannie Johnson Guest stars: Geoff Pierson as Henry, Costa Ronin as Vladislav, Marc Evan Jackson as Gene, Travis Schuldt as Frank, Milly Shapiro as Emma Rebecca
| 12 | 4 | "War of the Wagners" | Adam Davidson | Brian Gallivan | November 13, 2018 | T12.16154 | 2.91 |
Guest stars: Geoff Pierson as Henry, Costa Ronin as Vladislav
| 13 | 5 | "Yes, Deer" | Dean Holland | Brian Rubenstein | November 20, 2018 | T12.16155 | 2.73 |
Guest stars: Costa Ronin as Vladislav, Trent Garrett as Wes, Patty Guggenheim as Meegan, Ashley Rae Spillers as Holly
| 14 | 6 | "Glowing Pains" | Jay Karas | Ally Israelson | November 27, 2018 | T12.16156 | 2.78 |
Guest stars: Geoff Pierson as Henry, Monica Barbaro as Lisa Apple, Lance Lim as Gun-Woo, Cate Freedman as Rochelle, Helen Hong as Sunny, Kevin Bigley as Mr. Dodson, Jake Ryan as Nathaniel
| 15 | 7 | "Paige Turner" | Dean Holland | Sierra Teller Ornelas | December 4, 2018 | T12.16157 | 2.78 |
Guest stars: Costa Ronin as Vladislav, Ali Larter as Paige, Lance Lim as Gun-Woo, Jordan Feldman as Farro
| 16 | 8 | "Messy" | Jay Karas | Owen Ellickson | December 11, 2018 | T12.16158 | 2.98 |
Guest stars: Rowan Blanchard as China, Costa Ronin as Vladislav, Ali Larter as Paige, Marc Evan Jackson as Gene, Sydney Taylor as Bronwyn, Alex Lange as Luke, Jake Ryan as Nathaniel
| 17 | 9 | "Contact High" | Dean Holland | Emma Barrie | January 8, 2019 | T12.16159 | 3.48 |
Guest stars: Geoff Pierson as Henry, Ali Larter as Paige, Marc Evan Jackson as Gene, Kevin Bigley as Mr. Dodson, Brian Huskey as Dr. Weiss, Lizze Broadway as Zoey, Lynnette Gaza as Miriam
| 18 | 10 | "China-Curious" | Maggie Carey | Ally Israelson | January 15, 2019 | T12.16160 | 2.63 |
Guest stars: Rowan Blanchard as China, Sydney Taylor as Bronwyn
| 19 | 11 | "Baby's First Job Interview" | Daniella Eisman | Brian Rubenstein | January 22, 2019 | T12.16161 | 2.64 |
Guest star: June Diane Raphael as Tamryn Tomas Vandaloo
| 20 | 12 | "Luv Ya 2" | Michael McDonald | Emma Barrie & Owen Ellickson | February 12, 2019 | T12.16162 | 2.61 |
Guest star: Marc Evan Jackson as Gene
| 21 | 13 | "Everything's Okay" | Dean Holland | Alex Blagg & Emily Kapnek | February 19, 2019 | T12.16163 | 2.43 |
Guest stars: Geoff Pierson as Henry, Marc Evan Jackson as Gene and Monica Barbaro as Lisa Apple
| 22 | 14 | "Annie, Are You Okay?" | Michael McDonald | Ally Israelson | February 26, 2019 | T12.16164 | 2.53 |
Guest stars: Kimberly Hebert Gregory as Sunshine, Monica Barbaro as Lisa Apple, Marc Evan Jackson as Gene, Geoff Pierson as Henry, and Travis Schuldt as Frank
| 23 | 15 | "The Pump Station" | Dean Holland | Brian Rubenstein | March 19, 2019 | T12.16165 | 2.40 |
Guest stars: Monica Barbaro as Lisa Apple, Michael Harney as Don Apple and Lee Garlington as Dottie Apple
| 24 | 16 | "Melancholicky" | Maggie Carey | Emma Barrie | March 26, 2019 | T12.16166 | 2.45 |
Guest stars: Monica Barbaro as Lisa Apple, Kevin Bigley as Mr. Dodson and Poonam Basu as Sarah Lawrence Rep
| 25 | 17 | "Go Out the Lights" | Jay Karas | Sierra Ornelas & Alex Blagg | April 2, 2019 | T12.16167 | 2.30 |
Guest stars: Monica Barbaro as Lisa Apple and Travis Schuldt as Frank
| 26 | 18 | "Welcome Home" | Dean Holland | Owen Ellickson | April 9, 2019 | T12.16168 | 2.50 |
Guest stars: Monica Barbaro as Lisa Apple, Michael Harney as Don Apple and Lee Garlington as Dottie Apple

== Reception ==
=== Critical ===
On the review aggregator website Rotten Tomatoes, the series has an approval rating of 38% based on 21 reviews, with an average rating of 5.71/10. Metacritic, which uses a weighted average, assigned a score of 54 out of 100 based on 9 critics, indicating "mixed or average reviews".

=== Ratings ===
==== Overall ====
Viewership and ratings per season of Splitting Up Together
| Season | Timeslot (ET) | Episodes | First aired | | Last aired | | Avg. viewers (millions) | 18–49 rank |
| Season | Timeslot (ET) | Episodes | Date | Viewers (millions) | Date | Viewers (millions) | Avg. viewers (millions) | 18–49 rank |
|---|---|---|---|---|---|---|---|---|
| 1 | Tuesday 9:30 PM | 8 | March 27, 2018 | 6.96 | May 22, 2018 | 4.02 | 4.32 | TBD |
| 2 | Tuesday 9:30 PM | 18 | October 16, 2018 | 3.29 | April 9, 2019 | 2.50 | 2.76 | TBD |

==== Season 1 ====
Viewership and ratings per episode of Splitting Up Together
| No. | Title | Air date | Rating/share (18–49) | Viewers (millions) | DVR (18–49) | DVR viewers (millions) | Total (18–49) | Total viewers (millions) |
|---|---|---|---|---|---|---|---|---|
| 1 | "Pilot" | March 27, 2018 | 2.1/8 | 6.96 | 0.8 | —N/a | 2.9 | —N/a |
| 2 | "Devil May Care" | April 3, 2018 | 1.4/5 | 4.83 | 0.9 | 2.27 | 2.3 | 7.09 |
| 3 | "Street Meat" | April 10, 2018 | 1.2/4 | 4.13 | 0.7 | —N/a | 1.9 | —N/a |
| 4 | "Soups Jealous" | April 17, 2018 | 1.0/4 | 3.62 | 0.7 | —N/a | 1.7 | —N/a |
| 5 | "Nevertheless... She Went Clubbing" | May 1, 2018 | 1.1/4 | 3.80 | 0.62 | 1.70 | 1.72 | 5.51 |
| 6 | "Letting Ghost" | May 8, 2018 | 1.0/4 | 3.53 | —N/a | —N/a | —N/a | —N/a |
| 7 | "Star of Milo" | May 15, 2018 | 1.0/4 | 3.64 | 0.55 | 1.46 | 1.51 | 5.10 |
| 8 | "Heat Wave" | May 22, 2018 | 1.0/4 | 4.02 | 0.6 | 1.62 | 1.6 | 5.64 |

==== Season 2 ====
Viewership and ratings per episode of Splitting Up Together
| No. | Title | Air date | Rating/share (18–49) | Viewers (millions) | DVR (18–49) | DVR viewers (millions) | Total (18–49) | Total viewers (millions) |
|---|---|---|---|---|---|---|---|---|
| 1 | "Sign Language" | October 16, 2018 | 0.9/4 | 3.29 | 0.5 | 1.44 | 1.4 | 4.77 |
| 2 | "Asking for a Friend" | October 23, 2018 | 0.7/3 | 2.90 | 0.5 | 1.42 | 1.2 | 4.32 |
| 3 | "We Need to Talk About Karen" | October 30, 2018 | 0.9/4 | 3.28 | 0.5 | 1.35 | 1.4 | 4.64 |
| 4 | "War of the Wagners" | November 13, 2018 | 0.7/3 | 2.91 | 0.5 | 1.42 | 1.2 | 4.34 |
| 5 | "Yes, Deer" | November 20, 2018 | 0.6/3 | 2.73 | 0.4 | 1.29 | 1.0 | 4.01 |
| 6 | "Glowing Pains" | November 27, 2018 | 0.7/3 | 2.78 | 0.4 | 1.20 | 1.1 | 3.99 |
| 7 | "Paige Turner" | December 4, 2018 | 0.6/3 | 2.78 | 0.5 | 1.15 | 1.1 | 3.93 |
| 8 | "Messy" | December 11, 2018 | 0.7/3 | 2.98 | 0.4 | 1.08 | 1.1 | 4.06 |
| 9 | "Contact High" | January 8, 2019 | 0.7/3 | 3.48 | 0.4 | 1.32 | 1.1 | 4.80 |
| 10 | "China-Curious" | January 15, 2019 | 0.7/3 | 2.63 | 0.5 | 1.32 | 1.2 | 3.95 |
| 11 | "Baby's First Job Interview" | January 22, 2019 | 0.6/3 | 2.64 | 0.5 | 1.26 | 1.1 | 3.90 |
| 12 | "Luv Ya 2" | February 12, 2019 | 0.6/3 | 2.61 | 0.5 | 1.14 | 1.1 | 3.75 |
| 13 | "Everything's Okay" | February 19, 2019 | 0.6/3 | 2.43 | 0.4 | 1.16 | 1.0 | 3.59 |
| 14 | "Annie, Are You Okay?" | February 26, 2019 | 0.6/3 | 2.53 | 0.4 | 1.16 | 1.0 | 3.69 |
| 15 | "The Pump Station" | March 19, 2019 | 0.6/3 | 2.40 | 0.4 | 1.23 | 1.0 | 3.63 |
| 16 | "Melancholicky" | March 26, 2019 | 0.6/3 | 2.45 | 0.4 | 1.16 | 1.0 | 3.61 |
| 17 | "Go Out the Lights" | April 2, 2019 | 0.6/3 | 2.30 | 0.4 | 1.14 | 1.0 | 3.43 |
| 18 | "Welcome Home" | April 9, 2019 | 0.6/3 | 2.50 | 0.4 | 1.17 | 1.0 | 3.67 |
