= List of Suburgatory episodes =

Suburgatory is an American television sitcom that aired from September 28, 2011 to May 14, 2014, on ABC. The series follows a single father who decides to get away from New York City to the suburbs so he can give his teenage daughter a better life. However, the move to suburbs has the daughter wondering if they just entered the world of The Stepford Wives after they see how "perfect" their new locale is, right down to the neighbors who welcome them into the cul-de-sac.

== Series overview ==
Season	Episodes	Originally released	
Season	Episodes	First released	Last released
1	22	September 28, 2011	May 16, 2012
2	22	October 17, 2012	April 17, 2013
3	13	January 15, 2014	May 14, 2014

== Episodes ==
=== Season 1 (2011–12) ===
No. overall	No. in season	Title	Directed by	Written by	Original release date	Prod. code	US viewers (millions)
1	1	"Pilot"	Michael Fresco	Emily Kapnek	September 28, 2011	276054	9.81
After discovering that his 15-year-old daughter Tessa (Jane Levy) had a box of condoms in her room, single father George (Jeremy Sisto) relocates with her from New York to the suburbs. While he wants to be a better parent and hopes to provide better living conditions for Tessa, she struggles to come to terms with the oddity of suburban life.
2	2	"The Barbecue"	Michael Fresco	Bob Kushell	October 5, 2011	3X7103	9.11
Tessa is in love with her exact opposite, jock next-door neighbor Ryan Shay (Parker Young), much to the dismay of her new friend and Ryan's sister, Lisa (Allie Grant). This feeling starts when Tessa and George are invited by Ryan and Lisa's mom, Sheila (Ana Gasteyer) to her house for dinner. Tessa and Lisa go down to the Rumpus Room where Ryan and his friends are. Dalia (Carly Chaikin) dares Ryan to kiss Tessa, and when they do, Tessa starts falling for Ryan and vice versa, they kiss again underneath the bleachers. Meanwhile, George is pressured by Noah (Alan Tudyk) into throwing a barbecue.
3	3	"The Chatterer"	Michael Fresco	Emily Kapnek	October 12, 2011	3X7102	8.92
When George joins the PTA, he becomes well-liked by all the moms, which has Sheila, the de facto PTA leader, feeling threatened. Meanwhile, Tessa joins the school newspaper and with some help from fellow outcast Malik (Maestro Harrell), turns it into a tabloid-style paper. But when Malik is overtaken by popularity Tessa has to go to desperate measures to get back her friend. Also at the end of this episode, Tessa reveals to her father she isn't going to college.
4	4	"Don't Call Me Shirley"	Ken Whittingham	Patricia Breen	October 19, 2011	3X7104	8.82
When Sheila's precious Shirley Temple doll collection is stolen, Tessa can't help but be amused and admits to the crime, despite being innocent, in a bid to move back to New York. Meanwhile, afraid of being burgled themselves, Dallas (Cheryl Hines) and Dalia stay at the Altman house, annoying Tessa.
5	5	"Halloween"	Adam Davidson	Andrew Guest	October 26, 2011	3X7105	9.73
Tessa believes she has found the perfect costume for Halloween when she channels her inner "suburban girl", but her fellow students get more of a fright when her costume reminds them of Misty (Chloe Bridges) their recently "departed" classmate. Lisa and Malik attempt to exorcise Tessa to remove the former friend's spirit before Misty visits revealing that she didn't die as Lisa thought, she just moved to a boarding school called 'A better place'. George tries to help Dallas find the fun in Halloween, but receives a shock of his own when Dallas' husband Steven (Jay Mohr) returns home from his business trip.
6	6	"Charity Case"	Ken Whittingham	Adam Barr	November 2, 2011	3X7106	8.50
Tessa attempts to get her fellow students motivated in helping a charity, however the charity they choose to help isn't what Tessa was hoping for (help for people with oily skin). So Tessa decides to introduce her classmates to a transsexual homeless person as a lesson, but the plan backfires. Instead, her shallow classmates think that Tessa is trying to tell them that she is poor and so Tessa starts receiving charitable gifts from her classmates. Meanwhile, a huge dental bill from Noah puts a strain on his and George's friendship.
7	7	"Sweet Sixteen"	Adam Davidson	Corinne Marshall	November 16, 2011	3X7107	8.19
Dallas gets Dalia to plan Tessa's sixteenth birthday party, even getting her favorite band, 'Average shelf Life', to perform. Tessa is excited until Dalia shoves her own vision over Tessa's intended plans and shuns Tessa's friends saying they're 'not in my vision for this party' leaving Tessa annoyed. Meanwhile, George throws out his back and Sheila becomes his obsessive caretaker, even though George is terrified of her.
8	8	"Thanksgiving"	Alex Hardcastle	Emily Kapnek	November 23, 2011	3X7108	8.35
Tessa can't stand the thought of spending Thanksgiving in the 'burbs, so Dallas takes her for a day in the city. While out having fun, the two come across George making out with a woman, Zoe, even though he said he'd be working. Tessa openly confronts George about his lying at the Royces' Thanksgiving dinner, ruining the event. Meanwhile, Sheila and Lisa are at odds over an Amish dress Sheila wants Lisa to wear for dinner making Lisa attempt to rebel.
9	9	"The Nutcracker"	Randy Zisk	Patricia Breen	December 7, 2011	3X7109	8.02
Tessa decides to reunite George and his old flame Zoe (Gloria Votsis), because she blames herself for their breakup. But George is instead captivated by Aimee (Ellen Woglom), Tessa's art teacher. George then throws a tree-trimming party hoping for Aimee to become his girlfriend but Tessa's plans to reunite George and Zoe backfire when George admits he hated being with Zoe. George finds himself under the mistletoe with a special someone.
10	10	"Driving Miss Dalia"	Ken Whittingham	Brian Chamberlayne	January 4, 2012	3X7110	8.75
Tessa gets her driver's license and Dalia hires her to drive her around to stalk her crush, Scott Strauss (Thomas McDonell), who ends up falling for Tessa. George decides to join the local country club, but Noah refuses to sponsor him.
11	11	"Out in the Burbs"	Elliot Hegarty	Bob Kushell	January 11, 2012	3X7111	8.75
Tessa is asked to guide Josh Sherman (Dan Byrd), the new guy in school. After seeing him stare at the school jocks, she then believes that he is gay, unaware that he is really an undercover narcotics officer investigating the use of steroids. Lisa has a crush on Josh and tries to prove to Tessa that Josh is in fact straight. When Tessa asks Mr. Wolfe (Rex Lee) what she should do, she inadvertently inspires Mr. Wolfe to "come out" to the student body. George begins to re-evaluate his relationship with Dallas, after thinking that she is making sexual advances towards him. Dallas opens a crystal paper weight store.
12	12	"The Casino Trip"	Ken Whittingham	Andrew Guest	January 18, 2012	3X7112	7.05
George wins an all expenses paid trip to Atlantic City and takes Noah and Fred (Chris Parnell) with him on a "guy's weekend". Fred admits he has a gambling problem and is insistent that Sheila can tell what he's feeling. George catches Dallas' husband Steven chatting up a woman. Lisa believes that Tessa's meeting with Scott will end up with them having sex and so she lends Tessa her love box, containing condoms and syrup. Tessa tries to be alone with Scott, but it doesn't work out as planned. George gets a shocking surprise when he finds a box of condoms in Tessa's room again.
13	13	"Sex and the Suburbs"	Julie Anne Robinson	Adam Barr	February 8, 2012	3X7113	7.27
After finding a box of condoms in Tessa's room, George wants to keep Tessa in the house as much as possible so he plans a family game night with Tessa's friends. Tessa begins to gloat to Dalia about how Scott chose to be with her, but the more time she spends with Scott the less attraction she has for him. Ryan is shown to be jealous of Tessa and Scott's relationship. Dallas finally learns that Steven has been unfaithful to her. Jocelyn (Arden Myrin) seduces George and they finally have sex.
14	14	"The Body"	Phil Traill	Patricia Breen	February 15, 2012	3X7114	6.92
When Tessa sees that the school is only interested in athletics and not academics, she decides to run for class president against Kenzie and Kaitlin. George becomes obsessed with a flower bud in his garden. Ryan injures himself in a wrestling match and George gives him advice in his time of need. George admits he used to be involved in a band and attempts to write a song.
15	15	"Fire with Fire"	Alex Hardcastle	Emily Kapnek	February 22, 2012	3X7115	6.76
To get back at Tessa for "stealing" Scott Strauss, Dalia invites Lisa to be part of her "in" group, which Lisa eagerly accepts. So Tessa tries to recruit Kimantha (Abbie Cobb) into her group. Malik feels neglected after Lisa's betrayal to himself and Tessa. Meanwhile, frustrated with Noah's laziness and lack of attention to her requests, his wife Jill (Gillian Vigman) begins hitting the town with the newly-single Dallas and her new latin lover Yoni (Wilmer Valderrama), leading her to seriously consider divorcing Noah.
16	16	"Poetic Injustice"	Elliot Hegarty	Andrew Guest	February 29, 2012	3X7116	6.85
Tessa becomes jealous when her new poetry teacher is more fascinated with Dalia's poems than her own. Fred and Sheila compete against George and Dallas in croquet after Dallas parades a high number of men around the field distracting Sheila and Fred from their game. Fred becomes convinced that Sheila has been fantasizing about George after reading her diary.
17	17	"Independence Day"	Ken Whittingham	Emily Cutler	March 14, 2012	3X7117	6.21
Dallas invites her sorority sisters to celebrate the opening of her store, but her party is gatecrashed by an uninvited sorority member (Robin Givens). George meets up with Tessa's maternal grandmother after reading the poem Tessa wrote. Meanwhile, Tessa tries to show George that she can be independent by working for Dallas and buying her own wheels.
18	18	"Down Time"	Alex Hardcastle	Brian Chamberlayne	April 11, 2012	3X7118	6.04
Dallas' divorce is finalized and George is worried about her, so he invites her to shop for a mattress with Noah. Malik and Lisa confess their feelings and begin to date. Lisa feels sorry for Tessa and tries to set her up with Evan the school nerd. Tessa and Ryan go out together, and are spotted by Lisa, who surprisingly takes it well. Dalia begins seeing a therapist Dr. Richard Rohl (James Lipton) and later makes a breakthrough with Noah, who buys her a new pet to keep her company.
19	19	"Entering Eden"	Gail Mancuso	Patricia Breen	April 18, 2012	3X7119	5.69
George begins dating Eden (Alicia Silverstone), a woman he met at the town's farmer's market. George later finds out that Eden is going to be the surrogate mother of Noah and Jill's child. Tessa helps Dalia find Dallas' missing dog, which their counselor Mr. Wolfe had found and wants to keep as his own.
20	20	"Hear No Evil"	Peter Lauer	Andrew Guest	May 2, 2012	3X7120	5.79
George signs a contract promising Noah that he will not have sexual relations with Eden until she gives birth to the Werners' child. George becomes concerned about Tessa when she becomes more enthusiastic about working at Dallas' store. Lisa starts to believe that she was adopted by Fred and Sheila.
21	21	"The Great Compromise"	Randy Zisk	Charlie Carlisle & Aimee Jones	May 9, 2012	3X7121	5.94
Eden moves in with George and Tessa, shaking up the household. Sheila may be compromising Noah's relationship with Eden. Malik and Lisa look into attending a summer camp.
22	22	"The Motherload"	Ken Whittingham	Emily Kapnek	May 16, 2012	3X7122	5.42
The residents of Chatswin have an all-out celebration for the town's moms, leaving a void for Tessa. Dalia wants to go to Israel for Mothers' Day without Dallas. George and Eden attend a baby shower for Noah and Jill, but Eden is taken aback by the Werners' endangered animal theme. Fred surprises Sheila with a performance by her favorite artist, while Lisa discovers that Ryan was adopted.

=== Season 2 (2012–13) ===
No. overall	No. in season	Title	Directed by	Written by	Original release date	Prod. code	US viewers (millions)
23	1	"Homecoming"	Ken Whittingham	Emily Kapnek	October 17, 2012	3X7751	7.54
Tessa returns to Chatswin after spending the summer in Manhattan with her grandmother. Upon returning, she continues to be interested in her mother's life and decides to perform at the local talent show. While Jill is out of town for a book tour, Noah tries to get Carmen, Dallas' maid, to work for him. Lisa blackmails Sheila and Fred, after telling them she knows that Ryan is adopted.
24	2	"The Witch of East Chatswin"	Victor Nelli	Annie Weisman	October 24, 2012	3X7753	7.37
Tessa believes she being haunted by a witch (Rachel Dratch). George and Noah dress up as each other for Halloween, after Dallas had openly hoped that George would portray "Ken" to her "Barbie".
25	3	"Ryan's Song"	Alex Hardcastle	Andrew Guest	October 31, 2012	3X7752	6.32
Lisa helps Ryan pursue Tessa after she feels guilty for not telling him that he was adopted, but Ryan mistakes her generosity for pity that he's seriously ill. Meanwhile, Dallas invites her life coach Tabitha (H. Jon Benjamin) on her first date with George. Tessa babysits Opus when Noah and Carmen go to the opera.
26	4	"Foam Finger"	Alex Hardcastle	Brian Rubenstein	November 7, 2012	3X7754	7.55
George is confused by Dallas' behavior, when she overacts before they actually get romantic with each other. Tessa worries about Dalia when she becomes friends with her father's fiance Wan'Er (Dyana Liu) and abandons Kimantha, Kenzie and Kaitlin.
27	5	"The Wishbone"	Uta Briesewitz	Brian Chamberlayne	November 14, 2012	3X7756	7.07
Tessa's mother, Alex (Malin Åkerman) unexpectedly shows up in Chatswin for Thanksgiving. Malik comes over to the Shay's house for Thanksgiving dinner, and annoys Lisa when he actually gets along well with Sheila. Sheila accidentally walks in on a naked Malik getting out of the shower, embarrassing Lisa.
28	6	"Friendship Fish"	Phil Traill	Drew Hancock	November 28, 2012	3X7755	6.73
Now that Lisa and Malik have broken up, Lisa decides to spend an entire weekend with Tessa, even though Tessa had plans to spend the weekend alone in her room with her new tablet computer. George's friends from Manhattan, Theo and Cyrus (Brandon Keener and Eugene Byrd), visit him unexpectedly and ridicule his new posh life in the suburbs.
29	7	"Krampus"	Julie Anne Robinson	Emily Kapnek	December 5, 2012	3X7757	6.09
George arranges for Tessa to spend Christmas with Alex in Manhattan. Ryan finally finds out that he is adopted and doesn't want anything to do with his sister Lisa (Allie Grant) or the rest of the Shays anymore. Dalia makes a viral music video, to try to get Carmen to work for her again. Jill returns home from her book tour and feels uncomfortable about Carmen taking care of Opus, leaving Noah in the middle.
30	8	"Black Thai"	Alex Hardcastle	Patricia Breen	January 9, 2013	3X7758	6.84
Tessa insults Dalia after finding out she received a better gift for getting a high score on her PSATs. To make amends, George makes Tessa go to Dalia's hip hop dancing class, where a dance battle between the two girls ensue. Malik's parents (Tim Meadows and Paula Newsome) invite the Shays for dinner, where Ryan who now goes by the name "Eugene Goldfarb" is staying. Noah and Jill ask for Mr. Wolfe's help on getting Opus eligible for a prestigious day care.
31	9	"Junior Secretary's Day"	Elliot Hegarty	Matt Ward	January 16, 2013	3X7759	6.06
Tessa gets her wisdom teeth removed and later gets hopped up from the wisdom teeth medication, making her act very strangely. Fred hides in the Altman's basement, scared to tell Sheila that he was demoted to a junior secretary at his job.
32	10	"Chinese Chicken"	Alex Hardcastle	Andrew Guest	January 23, 2013	3X7760	6.09
With the rest of the school now aware that Tessa and Ryan are dating, Tessa feels alienated by the other football girlfriends who spend all their time serving their boyfriends. George, Noah and Fred start a Dads-only band, until Sheila intrudes.
33	11	"Yakult Leader"	Alex Hardcastle	Matt Ward	January 30, 2013	3X7762	4.73
Feeling that Yakult is not herself, Dallas hires Yoni (Wilmer Valderrama) to treat the dog, which puts a wedge between Dallas and George's relationship. Sheila asks Tessa to set Lisa up for a blind date.
34	12	"Body Talk"	Michael Patrick Jann	Brian Rubenstein	February 6, 2013	3X7761	5.73
Tessa signs up to host a talk show about teen issues for the school, however the show is taken over by Ryan, who instead talks about his body. Tessa is taken aback when the student viewers are far more interested in Ryan's topic. Dallas finds out that her house is actually located in East Chatswin, meaning all of her Chatswin privileges are revoked while Dalia has to attend another high school.
35	13	"Blowtox and Burlap"	Julie Anne Robinson	Anne Weisman	February 13, 2013	3X7763	5.91
Tessa and Ryan spend Valentine's Day evening watching an arthouse film, that has Ryan emotionally moved, but ends up confusing Tessa. Malik continues to try to win Lisa back. Sheila's mother (Mary Kay Place), intrudes on Shelia and Fred's Valentine's Day plans. Dallas undergoes a major botox procedure, which ends up making her look disfigured, forcing George to eat an 18-course meal all by himself, prepared by Chef Julio (Michael Voltaggio)
36	14	"T-Ball & Sympathy"	Phil Traill	Patricia Breen	February 20, 2013	3X7764	5.74
Tessa becomes a relationship adviser while Ryan is at an away game. Tessa agrees to help Mr. Wolfe, who suspects that Chef Alan is being unfaithful with his ex-boyfriend Chef Norman (J. P. Manoux). George is left stuck in the middle when Dallas and Noah manage competing T-Ball teams.
37	15	"Leaving Chatswin"	Elliot Hegarty	Drew Hancock	February 27, 2013	3X7765	6.12
Marty, a friend of George's and Noah's at the country club, passes away. George is left with the ashes upon discovering that Marty had very few close friends or family members. Tessa and Ryan think about their lives after high school, after Ryan says he spent his three days away visiting college recruiters.
38	16	"How to Be a Baby"	Victor Nelli	Brian Chamberlayne	March 6, 2013	3X7766	4.60
After revealing his love for Carmen to George, Noah tries to make his feelings a reality despite his marriage to Jill. Tessa interns for "published author" Jill, thinking the experience will look good on her college applications. The actual experience, however, becomes a strange one. Dalia agrees to give Mr. Wolfe a makeover, after his breakup with Chef Alan.
39	17	"Eat, Pray, Eat"	Elliot Hegarty	Charlie Carlisle & Aimee Jones	March 20, 2013	3X7767	4.19
Dallas feels neglected after seeing that George does not have much interest in a Deryck Whibley-autographed guitar that she bought him for his birthday. So to make up for George's disinterest, Dallas indulges herself in Italian food with Jill. Tessa begins to think that living in the suburbs for so long has made her dull. Noah once again tries to seek Carmen's attention.
40	18	"Brown Trembler"	Phil Traill	Patricia Breen	March 27, 2013	3X7768	5.33
George is asked by the mothers of Chatswin to help Noah, who has been living in the local hotel with Opus, following his divorce from Jill. George has Noah and Opus move in with him, which doesn't turn out well. Tessa helps Fred be more hip in order to get a new job. Dallas forces Dalia to throw out some of her things, to overcome her hoarding addiction.
41	19	"Decemberfold"	Linda Mendoza	Andrew Guest	April 3, 2013	3X7769	5.83
George becomes obsessed about his figure to make the December page of the annual "Fathers of Chatswin" calendar. Dalia becomes jealous when Noah's college-age daughter spends time with Tessa. Tessa and Lisa discover some strange secrets about Dalia.
42	20	"Go, Gamblers!"	Alex Hardcastle	Matt Ward	April 10, 2013	3X7770	5.60
Tessa helps Ryan with his decision on which college to attend. George contemplates moving in with Dallas, but Dallas becomes disappointed when it appears George is doing so to save money, rather than for romantic reasons. Sheila tries to sell George's house to Leslie (Johanna Braddy), a young single mother. Dalia, still fuming about Tessa sticking her nose where it didn't belong, reveals one of Tessa's secrets to Ryan.
43	21	"Apocalypse Meow"	Ken Whittingham	Annie Weisman	April 17, 2013	3X7771	5.33
Dallas and George try to figure out a way to tell Tessa that he's sold their house and the two are moving in together. The rift between Tessa and Dalia becomes physical. Tessa tells George that she'll never live under the same roof as Dalia. Despite her dating his therapist, Noah continues to obsess over Carmen.
44	22	"Stray Dogs"	Emily Kapnek	Emily Kapnek	April 17, 2013	3X7772	5.45
George buys a house for Dallas, and is then visited by her ex-husband, Steven. Sheila convinces Mr. Wolfe to throw a Chastity Ball at school, believing strongly that Lisa will be crowned queen. An emotionally distraught Tessa seeks solace in the bathroom stall.

=== Season 3 (2014) ===
On May 10, 2013, ABC renewed Suburgatory for a thirteen-episode third season, which premiered on January 15, 2014. Former regular cast member Rex Lee did not appear in season three, while Alan Tudyk was demoted to recurring status.

No. overall	No. in season	Title	Directed by	Written by	Original release date	Prod. code	US viewers (millions)
45	1	"No Me Gusta, Mami"	Ken Whittingham	Emily Kapnek	January 15, 2014	4X5651	5.30
Tessa returns to her mother's apartment to find George there, along with yet another good-bye note from Mom. George admits that Chatswin was a mistake and proposes that the two move back to the city, but they eventually move back into their Chatswin home as renters. With Ryan away at college, Sheila throws herself into her real estate work, much to the dismay of some neighbors, while the still-at-home Lisa is irritated by her parents referring to themselves as "empty nesters". Meanwhile, Dalia surprisingly misses George being around, and blames Dallas.
46	2	"Victor Ha"	Amy Heckerling	Andrew Guest	January 22, 2014	4X5652	5.91
Lisa convinces her parents to go on a romantic getaway to get over Ryan being gone, though Lisa has ulterior motives. On the way to the Catskills, however, Fred and Sheila stop by a foster home and adopt a 9-year old boy named Victor Ha. Meanwhile, George tries to talk things out with Dalia to help her get over his breakup with Dallas. This irritates Tessa, who is still furious with Dalia.
47	3	"Open Door Policy"	Ken Whittingham	Patricia Breen	January 29, 2014	4X5653	5.10
George is still heartbroken over his breakup with Dallas, to the point where he refuses to leave the couch and has hired Nora (Natasha Leggero) to walk his dog Biederman. Tessa calls her grandfather, George's divorced father Emmett (Geoff Pierson), to get George back in the dating scene. Meanwhile, Ryan comes back home to visit with his new girlfriend June (Lindsey Shaw), whom Tessa views as a clone of herself.
48	4	"The Birds and the Biederman"	Clare Scanlon	Brian Rubenstein	February 5, 2014	4X5654	6.09
George and Dallas have Tessa and Dalia speak for them, as part of a plan for them to have separate territories so they don't run into each other in Chatswin. Tessa begins to feel left out after finding out that Lisa has become good friends with June. Sheila is stressed from work, which starts to interfere with her romance with Fred at home. George and Dallas finally do run into each other at the dog park and have an uncomfortable conversation. Dallas then sees George run over to greet Nora.
49	5	"Blame it on the Rainstick"	Adam Davidson	Brian Chamberlayne	February 26, 2014	4X5656	5.22
In order to graduate, Tessa is required to take a skin tanning class taught by Dallas. Feeling that the class is unimportant, Tessa skips it to spend time with a free-spirited, nomadic band led by Caris (Mae Whitman). Noah is released from court-mandated anger management and has a much calmer attitude, which George finds creepy.
50	6	"About a Boy-Yoi-Yoing"	Rodman Flender	Annie Weisman	March 5, 2014	4X5655	5.72
Fred introduces George to a trendy new juice bar, with George breaking the pact he made with Tessa to avoid getting sucked into Chatswin culture. Evan (Sam Lerner), a nerd at school, invites Tessa, Lisa and Malik to his pirate-themed birthday party. Tessa only agrees to go so as not to hurt Evan's feelings, but she does so later anyway.
51	7	"I'm Just Not That Into Me"	Claire Scanlon	Andrew Guest	March 12, 2014	4X5657	5.39
Tessa meets Mark, her male counterpart at a college party and they soon begin dating. George becomes concerned for Lisa, when she tells him that she wants to marry Malik. Dallas and Dalia sign up for a dating service. While Dalia has a long list of qualifications for her ideal date, Dallas can't think of anything.
52	8	"Catch and Release"	Robert Duncan McNeill	Patricia Breen	March 26, 2014	4X5658	5.24
Lisa puts her plans in motion to propose to Malik, with Tessa being hesitant to give her blessing. Inspired by Lisa, Tessa tries to figure out if she still has feelings for Ryan, despite the fact that he and June are still dating. George becomes concerned that Nora may be too rude after seeing her interact with her employees, and he wonders if he should still date her.
53	9	"The Ballad of Piggy Duckworth"	Stuart McDonald	Brian Chamberlayne	April 2, 2014	4X5659	5.37
Dallas' mother passes away, with Tessa accompanying Dallas to her mother's funeral in the South. While there, Tessa helps Dallas confront the feelings of her mother and family. George and Noah have Fred accompany them on a group date. While there, a woman named Linda (Amanda Schull) hits on Fred, and he tries in vain to keep Sheila from finding out.
54	10	"No, You Can’t Sit with Us"	Silver Tree	Annie Weisman	April 23, 2014	4X5660	5.46
Tessa helps a preteen girl with low self-esteem compete in a child beauty pageant, pitting her against Dalia and her protégé. George, Noah, Fred and Victor go on a camping trip.
55	11	"Dalia Nicole Smith"	Tricia Brock	Brian Rubenstein	April 30, 2014	4X5661	5.51
When Dalia is refused admission to the only college she applied to, Dallas tries to figure out what her daughter's calling in life will be. George forces a reluctant Tessa to double date with Karen and Kenny (Christina Moore and Patrick de Ledebur), a charming mother and son they met during Tessa's college tour.
56	12	"Les Lucioles"	Alex Hardcastle	Emily Kapnek	May 7, 2014	4X5663	4.99
Lisa and Malik's wedding day arrives with Tessa planning the big day. Malik's parents are still opposed to the wedding and refuse to show up. Tessa decides to act on her lingering romantic feelings for Ryan, with June then sternly warning her to stay away from him.
57	13	"Stiiiiiiill Horny"	Julie Anne Robinson	Andrew Guest	May 14, 2014	4X5662	5.23
George is confused by his strong feelings after hooking up with Dallas on the night of Lisa and Malik's wedding. Newlyweds Lisa and Malik begin to argue almost immediately after declaring their vows. After losing her friend Lisa to marriage and failing at an attempt to reconnect with Ryan, Tessa joins some elderly ladies in a quilting circle. She eventually comes to realize that, despite June's objections, she must act on her feelings for Ryan one last time.
