= Selfie (TV series) =

American TV series

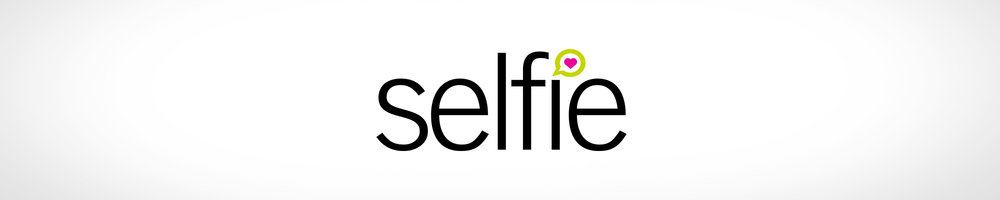
- Also known as: 再造淑女 (China)
- Genre: Sitcom; Romantic comedy
- Created by: Emily Kapnek
- Starring: Karen Gillan; John Cho; Da'Vine Joy Randolph; Allyn Rachel; David Harewood
- Composer: Jared Faber
- Country of origin: United States
- Original language: English
- No. of seasons: 1
- No. of episodes: 13

Production
- Executive producers: Julie Anne Robinson; Emily Kapnek
- Producers: Jill Danton; Amelie Gillette
- Camera setup: Single-camera
- Running time: 21–22 minutes
- Production companies: Piece of Pie Productions; Warner Bros. Television

Original release
- Network: ABC (episodes 1–7); Hulu (episodes 8–13)
- Release: September 30 – December 30, 2014

Selfie is an American television sitcom starring Karen Gillan and John Cho. Created and executive produced by Emily Kapnek for Warner Bros. Television, the series debuted on ABC during the 2014–15 television season. The series premiered on September 30, 2014. The pilot was made available early through video on demand and online streaming media on Twitter on August 20, 2014.

The show was canceled mid-season by ABC on November 7, 2014. On November 13, after broadcasting the seventh episode, ABC announced that they would pull the remaining episodes of Selfie and replace them with encore episodes of Shark Tank and Thanksgiving/Christmas specials.

On November 25, 2014, the first of the remaining six episodes was released online on Hulu and WatchABC.com. The rest followed on a weekly basis, with the last episode airing on December 30, 2014.

Despite being a short-lived series, critics later showed interest in Selfie as more episodes were released. There were also many supporters for the fan campaign to bring back the show. TV Guide called Selfie the "Best Turnaround" series of the decade. The series gained popularity in China on social media in the early 2020s. Selfie was considered for a movie revival, but the project did not move forward after Warner Bros. declined to sell the film rights.

== Premise ==
The series follows the life of Eliza Dooley, a sales representative at KinderKare Pharmaceuticals. She is obsessed with the idea of achieving fame through the use of social media platforms, including Instagram and Twitter, where she regularly posts selfies. She begins to worry that "friending" people online is not a substitute for real friendship, and she seeks help from co-worker Henry Higgs, a marketing image guru.

The character names are a reference to Eliza Doolittle and Henry Higgins, the main characters of the 1912 George Bernard Shaw play Pygmalion, further popularized by the 1956 musical My Fair Lady. In the play and musical, Henry is tasked with improving Eliza's social status, and ends up falling in love with his own creation. The Shaw play is in turn inspired by a story from Greek mythology, that of Pygmalion, a sculptor who fell in love with a statue he had created. The series featured modern social problems and music.

== Cast and characters ==
=== Main ===
- Karen Gillan as Eliza Dooley
- John Cho as Henry Higgs
- Da'Vine Joy Randolph as Charmonique Whitaker
- Allyn Rachel as Bryn, Eliza's nerdy neighbor
- David Harewood as Sam Saperstein, chairman of KinderKare Pharmaceuticals

=== Recurring ===
- Giacomo Gianniotti as Freddy (based on Freddy Eynsford-Hill), Eliza's boyfriend and a lawyer at KinderKare Pharmaceuticals
- Allison Miller as Julia Howser, a pediatric urologist that Henry dated
- Samm Levine as Terrence, a KinderKare office floater (later promoted to customer service) who marries Sam's daughter Maureen in the pilot episode, becoming the son-in-law of Sam and Yazmin Saperstein
- Brian Huskey as Larry, a lab technician at KinderKare Pharmaceuticals
- Matty Cardarople as Charlie, Henry's assistant
- Jennifer Hasty as Joan, fellow KinderKare Pharmaceuticals employee and Saperstein's secretary
- Patti Troisi as Linda, another KinderKare employee
- Nikhil Pai as Raj, KinderKare's new Human Resources employee
- Hayley Marie Norman as Maureen Saperstein, married to Terrence, daughter of Sam and Yazmin Saperstein
- Natasha Henstridge as Yazmin Saperstein, the wife of Sam Saperstein, mother of Maureen and mother-in-law of Terrence
- Kelsey Ford as Prue, Bryn's friend and member of the book club
- Colleen Smith as Wren, Bryn's friend and member of the book club
- Amanda Jane Cooper as Eyelet, Bryn's friend and member of the book club
- Sapir Azulay as Thistle, Bryn's friend and member of the book club
- Keith L. Williams as Kevin, Charmonique's son
- Tim Peper as Ethan, Henry's friend at KinderKare. Ethan appeared in the pilot episode, and was in promotional images with the main cast, but left the show after that

== Episodes ==
No.	Title	Directed by	Written by	Original release date	Prod. code	US viewers (millions)
TV
1	"Pilot"	Julie Anne Robinson	Emily Kapnek	September 30, 2014	276081	5.31
Eliza Dooley, a narcissistic pharmaceutical sales representative who finds herself attracted to social media, experiences travel sickness while aboard a business plane after finding out that the man she slept with often was married. Also aboard the plane is Henry Higgs, a successful marketing rep, who expresses his extreme dislike for social media and those who use it constantly. After being the subject of humiliation when her sickness bags explode over her, she decides to seek help from Henry Higgs after discovering that her social media popularity does not translate into off-line friendships. He begins by getting Eliza to ask people how they are, instead of just talking about how she is, and to make pleasant conversation. When Henry invites Eliza to his boss' daughter's wedding, she requests the help of her nerdy neighbor, Bryn, to find something suitable to wear. However, after the wedding, where Eliza uses her phone to play games, the two of them argue. Eliza calls Henry an anti-social, judgmental, critical workaholic, and Henry calls Eliza a lost cause. Eliza shares a conversation with receptionist Charmonique about something other than herself, and Charmonique compliments her, stating that whatever she was doing with Henry was working. Afterwards, Eliza finds Henry at his house, and apologizes for her earlier remarks and actions, and the two become friends again. Note: There are two different pilots. The original pilot is longer (26 minutes) and alternate pilot used on streaming services is shorter (21 minutes). The opening and ending scenes were the main differences.
2	"Un-Tag My Heart"	Phil Traill	Amelie Gillette	October 7, 2014	4X6853	3.77
Eliza explains the use of social media to Henry. After finding her flirting with Freddy, another employee, Henry forces Eliza to think about how she is perceived in the office. After observing the key points of her relationship with Freddy, she comes to realize that she is no more than a booty call for him. Taking advice from one another, Eliza attempts to obtain a hobby other than casual sex, while Henry creates a Facebook account. Henry finds that social media is addictive, and Eliza needs help getting Freddy to think about her more seriously. Eliza decides to take on a club, so she decides to join in on her book club, though she is quickly found out as not having read the book. Meanwhile, after being warned not to by Eliza, Henry starts to look in on his ex-girlfriends on Facebook. He then visits one at her house to apologize for tagging himself in her photo as her baby by accident, due to Henry having no Facebook experience. After deciding that having sex with Freddy would give her the strength to not have sex with Freddy again, Eliza gets hit by a car and falls down a manhole, before getting admitted to a hospital. Henry checks in on Eliza, but ends up accidentally tagging himself in one of her photos as a bedpan. Henry promptly deletes his account. Freddy also visits Eliza, but instead of it being a booty call, Freddy simply wants to make sure that if she needs a lift or help, he's there for her. Note: Un-Tag My Heart" and "A Little Yelp from My Friends" episodes are chronologically switched.
3	"A Little Yelp from My Friends"	Alex Hardcastle	Jessica O'Toole & Amy Rardin	October 14, 2014	4X6852	3.44
Henry is continuing to try to get Eliza to talk to people instead of using her phone continuously, but his project on her still isn't working. Sam Saperstein orders his employees to work on their interpersonal connectivity, initially by getting them to rate their connection on a scale up to ten with the employee sitting next to them. All goes well, up until Joan, a fellow employee who still has a grudge against her, gives Eliza a zero, though she believes that Eliza's bound to not notice since she's always staring at her phone. This is due to after having found herself extremely hungry, Eliza had eaten Joan's gazpacho. This leads Henry and Eliza to the realization that their most valuable office relationship is with each other, and Henry gives Eliza the job of befriending Joan. Eliza tries be friends with Joan by stalking her Yelp account with the help of Charmonique, and attends one of the dance classes that she attends. Eliza is eventually caught out by Joan about her Yelp-stalking, and admits that she was just trying to get to know her. Meanwhile, Larry attempts to get closer Henry after his wife leaves him, which Henry finds awkwardly frustrating, given that he's not an overly social person. Henry convinces Larry that his penchant for flash mobs won't get his wife back, and that a simpler gesture would work. Larry buys flowers and his wife appreciates this. However, Raj from KinderKare's HR department commences with the flash mob anyway, to Larry's horror.
4	"Nugget of Wisdom"	Alex Hardcastle	Emily Kapnek	October 21, 2014	4X6854	3.82
Henry challenges Eliza to help others during the weekend, so she offers to babysit Charmonique's young son, Kevin, while Charmonique is at her high school reunion, in an attempt to reconnect with Mitchell McMoney (Isaiah Mustafa), her high school sweetheart. However, Mitchell has become a priest and spends the evening berating Charmonique for having a child out of wedlock. Charmonique realizes that she is a great mother to Kevin, tells Mitchell that she regrets nothing about her life choices, and that she loves herself. Charmonique ends up dancing by herself at the reunion, but does so happily. While babysitting Kevin, Eliza tries to one up Fit Brit (Amber Rose), a fellow socialite. Henry tries to come up with a way to improve a chewable vitamin that put KinderKare Pharmaceuticals on the map.
5	"Even Hell Has Two Bars"	Todd Holland	Mathew Harawitz	November 4, 2014	4X6856	3.67
Sam Saperstein invites Eliza and Henry to spend the weekend at his Santa Barbara estate. Henry uses the opportunity to aim for a promotion. Eliza tries to loosen up the other guests, which only foils Henry's attempts to prove himself. Henry gets the promotion though, and the two reconcile, with Henry admitting to have grown accustomed to her face. Note: Despite airing directly before the episode "Never Block Cookies", the two episodes are chronologically switched. Terrence mentions his promotion to customer service at the start of "Even Hell Has Two Bars" but is promoted towards the end of "Never Block Cookies".
6	"Never Block Cookies"	Eric Appel	Brian Rubenstein	November 4, 2014	4X6855	3.23
Seeing how stressed Henry is, Eliza and Charmonique try to liven up his love life. In the process of getting Henry ready for (unbeknownst to him) a night out with dozens of potential dates, Eliza and Henry share a possible spark of romance, which they both quickly ignore. Upon realizing what Eliza and Charmonique have planned, Henry storms out, but runs into Julia, a woman who is as stiff and socially awkward as he is. They leave together. Terrence tries to seek the approval of his father-in-law Sam Saperstein. Upon realizing that Terrence does not become angry, (Sam even tells Terrence that Terrence is not good enough to be married to Sam's daughter), Sam decides that such a personality is well suited for customer service, and promotes him.
7	"Here's This Guy"	Christine Gernon	Brian Chamberlayne	November 11, 2014	4X6857	3.25
Henry begins a courtship with Julia, a pediatric urologist, eliciting jealously from Eliza over the decreasing time they share together. After Eliza posts immature comments about Julia on a review site for doctors, Henry calls off his sessions with Eliza, who is preparing to introduce a speaker at a pharmaceutical conference. Eliza apologizes to Julia and bakes her a cake in the shape of the human urinary tract, upon which the two come to an understanding, if not a friendship. After making the introduction, Eliza finds that Henry did attend after all, and cries with happiness when he agrees to continue their lessons.
Hulu
8	"Traumatic Party Stress Disorder"	Joe Nussbaum	Sierra Teller Ornelas	November 25, 2014	4X6858	N/A
For Henry's fortieth birthday, Eliza gets him tickets to see his favorite band, Blues Traveler. The concert creates friction between him and his girlfriend Julia, who is turned off by Henry's outgoing side being brought out by the music. Eliza also throws Henry a surprise birthday party, inviting the KinderKare staff while he is away at the concert, but upon arrival he is upset, with Julia having left. While Henry regrets yelling at Eliza and his coworkers, Julia returns later and admits her own discomfort. She admits that she can be cold at times, but that she is dedicated to their relationship, and upon kissing Henry, offers to spend the night. The next day, Henry admits to Eliza that he had a very good birthday.
9	"Follow Through"	Claire Scanlon	Eric Ledgin	December 2, 2014	4X6859	N/A
Henry convinces Eliza to follow through on her good ideas (specifically about a way to boost diaper cream sales). Upon getting asked to meet his parents, Eliza realizes that her relationship with Freddy is getting serious, which freaks her out. Meanwhile, after turning down the advances of Wren, one of Bryn's friends, Henry tries to convince Bryn to make Sam's favorite sandwich, which was being withheld. At dinner with Freddy's parents, Eliza realizes that her relationship with Freddy isn't really love and breaks up with him. Back in her apartment's elevator, she thinks about her friendship with Henry, the memories of her and Henry and how Henry is her only true ally who would always be there for her. When the elevator door opens, Henry is there (having come to apologize to Wren during a book club meeting). Eliza seductively, on the other side of the elevator, "reveals herself" in front of Henry, following through on her idea that the two of them could be together. Henry freaks out and leaves, but Eliza decides not to get discouraged, and vows to continue to follow through.
10	"Imperfect Harmony"	Elliot Hegarty	Sarah Tapscott	December 9, 2014	4X6860	N/A
Eliza attempts to find out Henry's feelings towards her, and in one confrontation, she admits to have fallen in love with him. Henry is in denial of his own obvious feelings towards Eliza, while also doubting that Eliza has any real feelings towards him. Henry decides that the risk is worth it to pursue a relationship with Eliza, but backs off after talking to a drunk Freddy at an office party. Henry wonders if a fear of commitment is why Eliza dumped Freddy and is pursuing him instead. Eliza is insulted by this theory, and tells Henry that she can see through his own relationship with Julia and how he is not in love with her. Julia, who was going to surprise Henry at the party, overhears and exits. Henry claims to be following after her, causing Eliza to revert to her party girl mentality, drinking heavily and ending up in bed with Freddy again. Henry, meanwhile, has not gone after Julia and begins to regret his choice of not being with Eliza.
11	"Perestroika"	Claire Scanlon	Jessica O'Toole & Amy Rardin	December 16, 2014	4X6861	N/A
Tension begins to brew in the workplace between the two after Henry cannot reciprocate his feelings towards Eliza. A dire financial situation befalls her, due to her reckless spending, which forces her to be evicted from her apartment. With no one to turn to, she seeks out Henry's help on her finances to control her spending, which in turn reconciles their friendship between them. Eliza and Julia have an unexpected confrontation, leading Eliza to realize that Henry and Julia are no longer a couple. Meanwhile, Eliza and Freddy decide to take their relationship to a more serious stage.
12	"Psyche" "Stick in the Mud"	Danny Leiner	Mathew Harawitz & Brian Rubenstein	December 23, 2014	4X6862	N/A
Eliza's sister, Bethany (Stephanie Koenig), visits. This reveals a childhood sibling rivalry once shared between them, which Eliza is unable to let go. KinderKare Pharmaceuticals holds its annual charity event, but decides to forgo the usual 10 km run for an obstacle mud run. This displeases Henry, as this event is Freddy's forte. Eliza suggests that Freddy mentor him on this event. During training, Freddy cannot help but harbor animosity towards Henry and their fighting during the actual race allows Charmonique to pull off a surprise win. An important lesson is learned through this ordeal, in which differences are overcome between Henry and Freddy as well as Eliza and Bethany.
13	"I Woke Up Like This"	Eric Appel	Amelie Gillette & Brian Chamberlayne	December 30, 2014	4X6863	N/A
With Henry's help, Eliza confronts her old school rival, Corynn McWatters (Julianna Guill), who has been selling a book in which she claims the unpopularity, loneliness, and bullying that Corynn had in fact inflicted upon Eliza during middle school. Through this Eliza learns to accept and embrace her former, more awkward self, and to see herself as a role model given how far she has come in life. Henry has challenged himself to skateboard on a ramp after merely having pretended to be a skateboarder ever since high school. Breaking an arm in the process, he now sports a cast with "NO FEAR" written on it, and reflects upon his adventures with Eliza. Henry decides that he has the courage to eventually express his feelings to Eliza, but will wait until the right time.

=== Ratings ===
Viewership and ratings per episode of Selfie
No.	Title	Air date	Rating/share (18–49)	Viewers (millions)	DVR (18–49)	DVR viewers (millions)	Total (18–49)	Total viewers (millions)
1	"Pilot"	September 30, 2014	1.6/5	5.31	0.3	0.78	1.9	6.09
2	"Un-Tag My Heart"	October 7, 2014	1.1/4	3.77	0.4	0.97	1.5	4.74
3	"A Little Yelp From My Friends"	October 14, 2014	1.0/3	3.44	0.3	0.85	1.3	4.29
4	"Nugget of Wisdom"	October 21, 2014	1.1/4	3.82	0.3	0.84	1.4	4.65
5	"Even Hell Has Two Bars"	November 4, 2014	0.9/3	3.67	—N/a	—N/a	—N/a	—N/a
6	"Never Block Cookies"	November 4, 2014	0.9/3	3.23	—N/a	—N/a	—N/a	—N/a
7	"Here's This Guy"	November 11, 2014	0.9/3	3.25	—N/a	—N/a	—N/a	—N/a

== Release ==
=== Broadcast ===
Selfie released the pilot episode early on Twitter on August 20, 2014. The show officially premiered on September 30, 2014, Tuesday, at 8:00PM PST on the ABC Network. It was up against competition in the same time slot with NCIS (season 12) on CBS, The Voice (season 7) on NBC, and The Flash on The CW, and Utopia on FOX, which later changed programming to MasterChef Junior (season 2). The first 7 episodes aired on ABC and after its cancellation, the remaining 6 episodes aired on Hulu.

Four episodes were aired out of order by the ABC network. The second and third episodes, "Un-Tag My Heart" and "A Little Yelp From My Friends," were switched along with the fifth and sixth episodes, "Even Hell Has Two Bars" and "Never Block Cookies." The original order is shown in the production codes and on the writers' whiteboard.

=== International broadcast ===
Warner Channel in Latin America aired Selfie on October 4, 2014. Warner TV Asia in some Southeast Asian countries aired the show on December 3, 2014. The series was also shown in South Africa on Vuzu Amp on January 15, 2015 and later on Vuzu on April 29, 2015. Kanal 5 premiered the series in Sweden on May 22, 2015. It was introduced on RTÉ2, television channel in Ireland on June 15, 2015. On July 6, 2015, the show aired on the ETC channel in the Philippines. In South Asia, Selfie was broadcast in India on November 8, 2015 on Zee Café, a premium channel. The series premiered in Australia on streaming platform Stan in 2015. The series began on TV2 in New Zealand on August 30, 2015. In Poland, the show appeared on Comedy Central Family Poland on August 25, 2016.

=== Home media ===
For a limited time, Selfie streamed on the ABC website and Hulu. It was on Hulu from November 25, 2014 to May 2015 and returned on May 1, 2016 until April 30, 2019. No official DVD or Blu-ray was made. Currently, Warner Brothers Television has not released Selfie on any streaming platforms.

== Production ==
=== Development ===
On October 8, 2013, ABC gave a put pilot commitment to Selfie, which was described as a comedy inspired by Pygmalion and My Fair Lady. The pilot was later picked up on January 30, 2014. On May 8, 2014, it was ordered to series.

Originally, the series started as an attempt to create a romantic comedy. Emily Kapnek explained, “We kind of came into the 'Pygmalion' element from behind.” She continued, "We started off talking about relationships, shows and potentially romantic comedies, and what the modern obstacles are. The presence of the ever-present phone and laptop and tablets at dinner tables and bedrooms and every sort of occasion… We learned that there was inherently a Pygmalion aspect, and we embraced it.”

=== Casting ===
It was reported on February 18, 2014 that Karen Gillan would star as Eliza Dooley. On February 24, 2014, Tim Peper and Da’Vine Joy Randolph were cast for the pilot. Allyn Rachel joined the show on February 24, 2014. David Harewood was added to the cast as Sam Saperstein on March 6, 2014. John Cho was announced as the male lead for Henry Higgs on March 13, 2014.

The producers initially intended to cast Henry Higgs as a white Englishman who was several generations older modeling after the original character. The casting process was very extensive. The creator, Emily Kapnek said, "We looked at tons of different actors, and really once we kind of opened our minds and said let’s get off of what we think Henry is supposed to be and just talk about who is, we just need a brilliant actor—and John [Cho]’s name came up." She also mentioned that the ABC network was the first to suggest color-blind casting. At the time, Keli Lee was the Executive Vice President of Talent and Casting at ABC who suggested Cho for the role. Julie Anne Robinson, one of the directors and executive producers who later worked on Bridgerton, advocated casting Cho and had to persuade "top to bottom of everybody in that chain" that he was the perfect choice for the role, which took a long time to consider. Robinson fought for Cho and won, saying, "That's what I'm most proud of about that whole pilot." Asians are often under-represented on American TV and it is very rare to see Asian males as romantic leads. Cho became the first Asian American man to play a romantic lead on a U.S. romantic comedy television series.

Humphrey Ker was one of the final candidates considered for the role of Henry.

Keli Lee also recommended David Harewood for the character Sam Saperstein, which was originally written as a white Jewish man, but Harewood gave a brilliant and funny performance.

=== Filming ===
Since Karen Gillan was filming Guardians of the Galaxy at the time, she had to shave her head for the role of Nebula and then wear a wig as Eliza on Selfie. In the pilot, she wore a generic wig for most of the first episode, then later switched to a personal wig that was made from her real hair after the character's makeunder scene and for the rest of the show. Her personal wig was made by the same costume department that worked on Star Wars: The Force Awakens.

Emily Kapnek decided that Gillan, who is Scottish, should portray Eliza as an American, which Kapnek felt was appropriate for the series. She explained, "It’s a very different story when you tell the story of a Scottish girl shunned by her coworkers. It obviously takes on an entirely different meaning. It was important to the material that she be American."

In the sixth episode, "Never Block Cookies" written by Brian Rubenstein and aired before the cancellation was announced, the writer described the behind the scenes with Gillan and Cho's characters, Eliza and Henry, having an intimate moment, which lead to an almost kiss. Rubenstein said that he remembered that moment in particular: “Emily [Kapnek] came down and was sort of orchestrating how that whole thing would go. Just the chemistry between those two was really cool to watch; it felt that way on set.”

=== Costume design ===
Costume designer Danielle Launzel described her work on Selfie, "We sometimes have up to 60 costume changes for all of the characters in one episode. That means there will be a lot of shopping and fittings to do over a five day period."

Launzel also collaborated with the actors in order to find the right look for their story each week to ensure that the wardrobe she choose is an extension of the show's story. Launzel commented, “By the time an actor has a fitting, I have already read the next episode and figured out how many changes their character has and what they are doing in the scenes that might affect their clothes. During the fitting the actor and I will work together to decide what they should wear for all of his or her 'story' days."

=== Promotion ===
There were advertisement posters and a billboard promoting the show. The cast and crew had interviews and joined the Television Critics Association press tour. Cho and Gillan both appeared on Good Morning America, The View, and separately on Jimmy Kimmel Live!. Cho also appeared on The Queen Latifah Show. A video tag was created to encourage other social media personalities to participate. The studio created character social media profiles for Eliza Dooley under the handle @The_Doolio on Twitter and Instagram to promote the show and encourage fan engagement. Additionally, the cast and crew would also live tweet when episodes air.

== Post-airing ==
After the show was canceled, a fan campaign was created and the remaining six filmed episodes of Selfie were released on the ABC website and Hulu on November 25, 2014 until May 2015. The series was originally intended to have a full first season with 26 episodes in total. One of the writers, Brian Rubenstein, mentioned to The A.V. Club in 2017, "I know we had a plan for what the next 13 [episodes] was going to be for their story, but I can’t for the life of me think of it right now!"

He also said, "You need time to figure out the show, and come together and fully realize what it is.” The writer continued, “It’s very rare that a comedy is just roaring out of the gate. You need to give things time to find the voice. I can’t speak to the business side of things recovering or ratings growing or whatever that is, but it does suck that we are on such a short leash—and we all do feel it, but at the same time there’s nothing we can do about it.”

Rubenstein was surprised Selfie was still being brought up even long after the show was finished. He recalled being confused at work when a writer’s assistant suddenly asked him several questions about the show. The assistant informed him that the series was on Hulu's front page at the time. Rubenstein remarked, "So that’s really cool that it can live on in that way.”

In October 2025, Karen Gillan mentioned her experience on the show, "I had the time of my life on Selfie. I tried completely different things every single take. It was a field day living in that space. I had so much fun with that character. And to be in an American sitcom was a dream. I grew up watching Friends, and then filmed opposite their stage on the Warner Bros. lot. I would stare in disbelief. It was a pinch-me moment."

== Cancellation and fan campaign ==
Despite reasonable potential for the series, Selfie had problems attracting an audience. Ratings slipped after the first episode to an undesirable 0.9, and remained stagnant through the season. It was also up against long-running shows like NCIS and The Voice in the same time slot. As a result of this, ABC announced that Selfie would be cancelled on November 7, 2014.

Fans began a #SaveSelfie campaign to keep the television show on the air. A fan from Kentucky, Erica Lawson, created a change.org petition for a second season renewal with over 65,000 supporters. In order to bring more awareness to the movement, fans also made fan media, held contests, and fundraised for charity. The fundraiser was created on December 24, 2014 by Clinton Alvord with the support of Lawson and other fans. It was inspired by the show's character, Henry who regularly donates to UNICEF. They raised $1000 for UNICEF on Crowdrise (later acquired by GoFundMe) by January 31, 2015. Another fan, Heather Johnson, retweeted as many #SaveSelfie hashtags as possible, created "Save Selfie" t-shirts and caps, and along with other fans mailed lipsticks to the president of ABC Studios to demonstrate loyalty to the show. She also tweeted a picture of herself with her boyfriend using the same pose as actors on the show depicting a similar relationship as a White-American woman and Asian-American man highlighting that representation in media is important.

The seventh episode of Selfie was aired on November 11, 2014, which would be later realized to be the final aired episode on network television. On that same day, Guy Aoki, founder of Media Action Network for Asian Americans (MANAA), pitched in to help with the cause by contacting ABC President Paul Lee and diversity head Tim McNeal inquiring what could be done to save the show. McNeal said while Lee was a big champion of the sitcom, the rating numbers were not there. When sponsors place ads on a television program, the network guarantees a target number. If it does not reach the audience target number, the network would have to refund the money to the sponsors and end up losing money. The next step would to ask advertisers to be patient to give the series a chance grow, but the ABC network did not give any more opportunities to broadcast the rest of the episodes. The ABC President said, "Unfortunately once we make those decisions it's impossible to go back on them...It was a very difficult decision because it was a very, very good show." However, in the following year, he favored and renewed other shows with declining ratings, such as Marvel’s Agent Carter, Galavant and American Crime, giving them more time to grow their audience instead. Aoki noted that Selfie series trended on Twitter in the Los Angeles area peaking at #5 with 50,000 tweets about the show in a month. Many fans from around the world like the U.S., U.K., Italy, China, Brazil, and Russia expressed their grief over the cancellation.

On November 19, Kapnek tweeted that all remaining episodes of the series would be released online on Hulu, Hulu Plus, and ABC.com, with official confirmation in news articles coming a few days later. The official pages managed by ABC did not advertise or update about the remaining episodes.

While many fans were complacent with news, MANAA was still determined that the studio should try to shop to another network. After Johnson attended a meeting with MANAA, she attempted to contact the Warner Brothers president at the time, Peter Roth, since the show was produced by the same company. However, Roth's secretary hung up on both the fan and Aoki. She also sent an email message to Roth's office, only to receive a message from Selfie's publicist. Aoki followed up and noted while the company was "definitely aware" of the #SaveSelfie movement, they could not reveal if there was any plan to save the series. Since the studio put the episodes for free online, it was determined that they were not interested in shopping to another television network. However, persistent efforts from the fans helped push the online release of the remaining episodes on Hulu and ABC.com sooner than normally expected, which was about two weeks after the cancellation. Compared to the early cancellation of Manhattan Love Story on ABC, which also aired the same Tuesday night as Selfie, it took over a month for the rest episodes of Manhattan Love Story to be released. And in another case, Don't Trust the B— in Apartment 23, also previously canceled by the same network, it took about four months to release its remaining episodes after the show left the air.

Selfie was listed as one of the most popular shows and popular episodes on Hulu's home page.

After the show ended, Selfie continued to have a dedicated following of fans years later.

== Reception ==
=== Critical response ===
Initially, reviews were unfavorable towards the show's pilot episode. Hillary Busis of Entertainment Weekly wrote on October 3, 2014 about the first episode that “There could be a decent show trapped within Selfie … Too bad the show’s cruel sense of humor and reliance on instantly dated references … may very well drive away viewers before they can see what Selfie and Eliza become.” In addition, EW staff criticized the show's flawed portrayal of social media and stated that "technology and social media is integrated far more naturally into the lives of most people." Kevin Fallon of The Daily Beast remarked, "It’s not often that a comedy is both this endearing and repugnant. It’s hard to remember when a sitcom was as relatable and inviting as it is alienating." Soraya Nadia McDonald of The Washington Post was critical of the inaccurate portrayal of millennials and the underdeveloped supporting characters. Brian Lowry of Variety wrote, "There’s much to be said about social media self-obsession in the digital age, but almost nothing memorable about it in this latest spin."

However, later reviews began to show interest in the television show. Eric Francisco from Inverse mentioned, "But a funny thing happened on the way to cancellation: Selfie got better. Cho and Gillan displayed more comfort in their roles — and their chemistry became electric, then downright hot." He pointed out that "it seemed that it took a cancellation for people to realize that Selfie was the first American comedy series to feature an Asian-American romantic male. Busis changed her opinion of the show in a follow-up on EW. Vulture lamented its cancellation. Salon did too, calling Henry and Eliza 'the most promising interracial couple on TV.'" After picking up the series again on a whim, Busis said that Selfie was "a show that’s firmly on the upswing—and I’m bummed to see it cut down just when it was starting to realize its potential." Vanity Fair remarked, "Selfie was cancelled just when it was getting great..The fizz-pop chemistry between Karen Gillan and John Cho is not to be missed." The New Republic observed, "'Selfie' has quietly turned into one of the funniest, most delightful sitcoms on TV." Francisco stated, "Selfie wasn’t perfect, but it deserved to grow — and Cho deserves another chance at leading a major TV series; it seems as if networks gave him just one chance, while most white actors get shot after shot at a successful show."

=== Awards and nominations ===
In November 2014, Selfie was nominated for the "Favorite New TV Comedy" People's Choice Award for 2015. However, their name was removed one month after the show's cancellation even though the remaining episodes were still being released on Hulu and was not included in the group of finalists. Fans and the creator expressed disappointment in the delayed decision without having an official explanation from People.

== Legacy ==
=== Cultural impact ===
John Cho became the first Asian American man to play a romantic lead on a U.S. romantic comedy series with his role on Selfie. Asian Americans have historically been underrepresented in Hollywood and Asian men have rarely been portrayed in romantic lead roles. Karen Gillan noted that the more she meets fans of the show, she realized how important having Cho as a romantic Asian male lead and was proud of that achievement.

Even years after, Selfie is still referenced and praised in articles. The series has been featured on lists about recommended shows or shows cancelled too soon like on Nerdist, Entertainment Weekly, E!, Thrillist, USA Today, Collider, and TVLine. In December 2019, Megan Vick from TV Guide stated, "Selfie remains the best turnaround of the decade, that we started to appreciate too late." In September 2020, Kirby Beaton of BuzzFeed published an article titled "Selfie Was The Millennial Show We All Needed And I Miss It Every Damn Day." In October 2020, Alexis Nedd from Mashable wrote that Selfie would greatly benefit with a different name. She commented, "Eliza and Henry deserved a second chance, a continued rebrand, and most importantly — a better title." The show displayed good comedy, engaging characters, consistent emotional arc, and strong chemistry between the romantic leads. Nedd also noted that it was "one of the first sitcoms to address social media addiction and influencers with nuance and understanding." In August 2021, Elizabeth Logan of Glamour reviewed a romantic comedy film, He's All That, but also brought up Selfie stating its premise was perhaps ahead of its time. Logan remarked, "If the algorithm is listening, I have a suggestion: Netflix, buy up the few episodes of Selfie. Your audience is primed for it." In January 2022, Lyvie Scott of Slash Film commented, "A 'Selfie' reprisal would have plenty to play with — and it wouldn't hurt to see Gillan and Cho pick up their fantastic rapport once more." In March 2025, Clarence Snell from Screen Rant remarked, "The series is sweet, and even now it still deserves a second season."

=== Fandom ===
Selfie gained a cult following after its broadcast. When the cancellation was announced, dedicated fans attempted to revive the show by displaying their support on social media with hashtag #SaveSelfie, email messages, phone calls, $1000 donation to UNICEF on Crowdrise, and a change.org petition with over 65,000 signatures. However, no other television network picked up the series. Hulu and ABC.com were only able to show the rest of the unaired episodes for a limited time.

After the show ended, several fans throughout the years have given support to Karen Gillan regarding Selfie at conventions and asked what were her thoughts about the possible ending for Eliza and Henry. She replied that Eliza and Henry would have been married and had Korean ginger babies.

In July 2015 at a Nerd HQ event, actor Alan Tudyk recommended Selfie to the audience and highly praised Gillan by saying, "I don't know what goes on with ABC and all the Warner Brothers. I don't know how they decide what stays and what goes, but I feel like if they had given that show a real shot, Karen would have been getting Emmys. I don't know any other comedic actress on television that was delivering such a solid performance week after week after week."

In January 2018, in an interview with John Cho on one of NPR's podcasts, Pop Culture Happy Hour, Linda Holmes said, "People still really miss and talk about Selfie. It goes by on my Twitter feed relatively frequently how much people miss it." Cho replied that he also misses the show. He mentioned that it was very fulfilling for him and that he had such a good time working on the series. Cho was a guest on the podcast of They Call Us Bruce Lee episode 47 in August 2018. One of the hosts, Phil Yu remarked that fans from all different backgrounds would like to see Cho reprise his role on Selfie. Cho responded that he thought about the idea of having a musical film of Selfie, going back to its roots with My Fair Lady.

In a January 2019 Bustle interview, Gillan also supported the thought of making a movie version so that Henry and Eliza's story could have closure. In May 2019, Gillan answered in a podcast that she still gets asked about the show and said, "Yes! Oh, my God. It's actually so crazy how much of a lifespan this thing has had considering it was only 13 episodes." She also stated that she would love to work with Cho again on another project.

In 2020, Gillan commented about the strong fan base for the short series.

In an interview with Refinery29 in July 2021, Gillan responded that she still gets constant tweets from fans saying they miss the show. The actress was open to the idea to revisit the show with Cho and suggested a smaller project. She was also informed that she is most known for Selfie on her IMDb page.

Da'Vine Joy Randolph said in May 2022 that it meant a lot to her and the cast that people still talk about the series eight years later. She also mentioned that she would join a Selfie revival and suggested a movie or limited series. Randolph later commented that she loved working on the show and that her character was one of her favorite roles. In July 2022, when asked about Cho's thoughts on the show's cancellation, he answered, "I'm still stunned to see how many people still love that series. And yeah, I was bummed when it got canceled. I just thought that was a good show." He also mentioned his castmates and the crew, "It's hard to get a whole lot of talented people on one show. And so my philosophy is, when you got them, keep it going."

In January 2023, Cho stated he has not received many offers for romantic comedy roles since Selfie. In July 2023, he also reacted to fans' comments about bringing the show back. Cho responded that he had a positive experience working on the series, enjoyed acting with Gillan, and thought the writing was sharp. He also remarked, "Hopefully, I can work with some of those people again."

In March 2024, Cindy White of The A.V. Club talked about how she wanted more seasons of Selfie and that Cho and Gillan had a lot of chemistry. Gillan responded that she loved the TV show and that it was "so, so much fun to work on." In June 2024, Karen Gillan spoke with Collider about the fandom's continuing love and support for the series. Gillan commented, "The reaction to that TV show is actually extraordinary. People still talk about it. There are all these fan accounts trying to get it to come back...I definitely want to collaborate with (creator) Emily Kapnek again on something because I really love that character and wanna do something else with her. We’re gonna be cooking something up, for sure."

In December 2025, a clipped video edit of Selfie went viral and received over 37 million views.

In September 2026, actor Simu Liu expressed his appreciation for Selfie in response to a post about how Hollywood has overlooked Asian men in leading roles. In October 2026 at the SCAD Savannah Film Festival, Cho mentioned he still gets asked about Selfie all the time.

=== International recognition ===
Selfie had a resurgence in China beginning in 2021 due to trending videos featuring the characters Eliza and Henry on social media platforms like Douyin, Weibo (3 million views) and Bilibili (2 million views). The show is known as a different title in Chinese: 再造淑女; pinyin: zài zào shū nǚ; lit. 'Remaking a Lady', 'Reinvented Lady' and has an above average score of 8.5 out of 10 on Douban. Chinese audiences had positive reactions to the show and mentioned that it was similar to Korean dramas, which are popular internationally. Viewers praised the slow burn romance, chemistry between the leads, and the main character's personal growth. The series has continued to attract audiences since then. Fans even used episode scripts as study guides to learn English, dress up as the main characters in cosplay, created fan art, and made commentary videos that received more than 1,000 comments.

An Internet meme was also created for the series. Chinese: 山猪吃不了细糠; lit. 'A wild boar can’t eat fine bran'. Someone who is rough or unrefined (like a wild boar) can’t handle something refined or high quality (fine bran). A similar English phrase would be "Don't cast your pearls before swine." It implies that valuable things should not be wasted on people who will not appreciate them. Chinese fans used the phrase jokingly to suggest that American viewers failed to appreciate a good show.

Many Chinese fans were sad and disappointed that Selfie did not continue with a second season and that the main characters did not end up together.

== Revival ==
Selfie, better known as 再造淑女 in Chinese, gained popularity in China through social media in 2021. Many fans had a strong demand for a second season since there was no closure to the story. Chinese actress and U.S. producer from Stars Collective Films Entertainment Group, Liu Yuxin (English name: Yoyo Liu) posted an image of the main actors, Karen Gillan and John Cho on March 17, 2023. Stars Collective was founded by CEO Peter Luo of Starlight Media, a Beverly Hills financing and production company and also a subsidiary of Starlight Culture Entertainment. Luo financed films such as Crazy Rich Asians, Marshall and The Garfield Movie. Liu later mentioned she was in talks of a Selfie movie sequel. In January 2024, Liu was asked in the comments on a Weibo post if there's a chance for Selfie to return, she replied that Warner Brothers will not release the copyright, but she will try her best to communicate with the original cast and crew to create another story. Warner Brothers, under the leadership of CEO David Zaslav at the time, retained control of the rights. Currently, a revival project has not been approved.

== In popular culture ==
- Selfie was featured in Pop Culture Jeopardy! season 1, episode 5 on December 11, 2024
