= Dr. Sulfur's Night Lab =

1996 educational video game

- Developer: McGraw Hill Home Interactive
- Platform: Windows
- Release: 22 October 1996
- Genre: Educational
- Mode: Single-player

Dr. Sulfur's Night Lab is a 1996 educational video game developed by McGraw Hill Home Interactive for Windows. The game guides players through science experiments whilst teaching basic chemistry. Dr. Sulfur's Night Lab was part of a line-up of the first original CD-ROMs released by the publisher, alongside Pony Express Rider, Pyramid: Challenge of the Pharaoh's Dream and The Fennels Figure Math.

The game received generally positive reviews, with praise directed at the game's interactivity and simulation of a science laboratory.

== Gameplay ==
Gameplay screenshot

Dr. Sulfur's Night Lab features a range of games and science experiments to demonstrate principles of chemistry. It simulates a virtual chemistry laboratory called the 'R&D Lab' including creatures that assist in players experimenting with organic chemicals, metals, salts, nonmetals and other small molecules by using tools from the 'Chem Cart'. The objective of the game is to assist Dr. Sulfur and his assistants in performing chemistry experiments after creatures he created named Elemutants caused havoc in his laboratory and destroyed his data. Experiments include to identify unknown compounds, create an explosion from chemicals or balance acids with bases. Other game modes include quizzes in which players must identify the correct chemical element from a list of choices.

== Reception ==
Publishers Weekly commended the game for being as "hands-on as computer programs get" and finding it "a perfect blend of silliness, stimulation and education". The Indian River Press Journal considered the game "educational, fun and historically interesting", although found its presentation of the laboratory as a "sinister place" could discourage children from investigating science. Describing the game as "interesting and challenging", Science and Children praised the game as having appeal to students of all skill levels, and that it was the "perfect safe substitute" to a chemistry set for students. Although the Daily News found the puzzles featured "helpful" clues, the author considered them difficult as a "science-fair veteran".

In a retrospective review, Video Game History Foundation librarian Phil Salvador wrote about Dr. Sulfur's Night Lab for his website The Obscuritory. Salvador praised the game, stating it was one of the "most accomplished" and "most ambitious" science education titles of its era due to the realistic scope of its "fully-featured" chemistry lab simulation. However, he critiqued the game for countering the inaccessibility of its science content with "wacky characters", "arbitrary learning activities", and focus on games, finding their inclusion "baffling" and "an attempt to appeal to a wider audience".
