= Pyramid: Challenge of the Pharaoh's Dream =

1996 video game

Pyramid: Challenge of the Pharaoh's Dream is a 1996 education adventure game for Windows and Macintosh developed by Knowledge Adventure and published by Edusoft SA, published in Sweden by Knowledge Adventure and Levande Böcker.

The player is an archeologist, travelling to Egypt to discover the secrets of the Pyramid of Giza. Their travels are interrupted however by the gods Anubis and Ra who guide the player and direct them to fulfil the pharaoh's goal - for the pyramid to be built for his eternal rest. The player completes challenges to collect scrolls, which they give to the gods to have further sections of the game unlocked.

The game sees the player build a pyramid using period tools and discover facts about the culture of Ancient Egypt.

The game's genre has been defined as a real role play and strategy game. Sets and special effects were created by the Academy Award-winning production house Dream Quest Images. The game contains "Virtual flight" technology and photo-realistic sets.

McGraw-Hill Home Interactive announced the title alongside Dr. Sulfur's Night Lab, The Fennels Figure Math, Pony Express Rider, in April 1996, with a release date of November '96 for Windows '95, and Q1/'97 for the Apple Macintosh. They were to be published in the US initial, with international distribution to follow. In August 1996, John Koronaios was appointed as vice president of sales and worldwide distribution, with tasks in "establishing the MHHI sales force, developing partnerships with retailers and distributors and creating a strong distribution network both nationally and internationally" for their four titles. MHHI donated 3,000 copies of their children's CD-ROM titles to the Smart Valley, Inc. SmartSchools PC Day program on November 16, 1996. The game was submitted for a National Parenting Center Seal of Approval. and was awarded this.

La Revista compared the title to The Pink Panther: Passport to Peril. PC Mag praised the "terrific graphics". Presenting the Past felt it was "funny and surprisingly accurate". Daily News wrote the game "puts the learning back into fun". Microtimes felt the title offered an "accurate depiction" of the life and times of Ancient Egypt.
