= Urban Legend (musicians) =

- Origin: Los Angeles, California
- Genres: Latin, Samba, Zouk, Funk, Electro, Cumbia, Alternative hip hop, Charanga, Dance, Reggae fusion, Bossa nova
- Years active: 2005-present
- Labels: Blind Lemon Music
- Members: J-Radical, Kool Kojak
- Website: www.urban-legend-music.com

Urban Legend is a Latin-American production team duo consisting of J-Radical & Kool Kojak.

Their first CD “Tranquilidad Cubana”, was released in 2006, it earned them 4 top 5 singles on the CMJ world charts. In 2010 they released their second CD “Tropical Techniques”, which was released on January 4; the album features guest appearances from Debi Nova, Destani Wolf, La Bruja, Chana, Marthin "Chino" Chan among others. The duo found a record label called "Blind Lemon Music", in which they have released both albums.

Urban Legend's songs have been featured on TV shows such as Dexter, Cane and Marthin Chan’s Indie 101 on MTV3.

== Discography ==
- "Tranquilidad Cubana" - (November 16, 2006)
- "Tropical Techniques" - (January 4, 2010)
