= Suburgatory =

- Genre: Sitcom
- Created by: Emily Kapnek
- Based on: Suburgatory: Twisted Tales from Darkest Suburbia by Linda Keenan
- Starring: Jeremy Sisto; Jane Levy; Ana Gasteyer; Rex Lee; Carly Chaikin; Allie Grant; Chris Parnell; Alan Tudyk; Cheryl Hines
- Narrated by: Jane Levy
- Opening theme: "Pleasant Nightmare" by Alih Jey
- Composer: Jared Faber
- Country of origin: United States
- Original language: English
- No. of seasons: 3
- No. of episodes: 57 (list of episodes)

Production
- Executive producers: Emily Kapnek; Michael Fresco
- Producers: Peter Burrell; Morgan Sackett (pilot only); Jill Danton; Ken Whittingham; Annie Weisman; Andrew Guest
- Camera setup: Single-camera
- Running time: 22 minutes
- Production companies: Piece of Pie Productions; Warner Bros. Television

Original release
- Network: ABC
- Release: September 28, 2011 – May 14, 2014

Suburgatory is an American television sitcom created by Emily Kapnek that aired on ABC from September 28, 2011, to May 14, 2014. The series originally aired on Wednesday nights at 8:30/7:30 Central following The Middle. The title is a portmanteau, devised by former CNN Senior Producer Linda Keenan, of the words "suburban" and "purgatory". On May 9, 2014, Suburgatory was canceled by ABC after three seasons.

== Premise ==
The series follows single father George Altman, who has been raising his daughter Tessa in a New York City apartment and providing for her with his job as an architect ever since his wife divorced him when Tessa was still an infant. Upon discovering a box of condoms in Tessa's bedroom drawer, he decides they should move to the suburbs, believing this environment will be more wholesome. Once in the suburban community of Chatswin, the Altmans quickly discover how much they do not fit in with the upper middle class lifestyles of their neighbors, and must learn to navigate the politics of their new surroundings.

== Episodes ==
Season	Episodes	Originally released	
Season	Episodes	First released	Last released
1	22	September 28, 2011	May 16, 2012
2	22	October 17, 2012	April 17, 2013
3	13	January 15, 2014	May 14, 2014

== Cast ==
Actor	Character	Season 1	Season 2	Season 3
Jeremy Sisto	George Altman	Main	Main	Main
Jane Levy	Tessa Altman	Main	Main	Main
Carly Chaikin	Dalia Oprah Royce	Main	Main	Main
Allie Grant	Lisa Marie Shay LeFrique	Main	Main	Main
Cheryl Hines	Dallas Royce	Main	Main	Main
Ana Gasteyer	Sheila Shay	Main (Note: Recurring until episode 14 of season 1.)	Main	Main
Alan Tudyk	Noah Werner	Main	Main	Recurring
Rex Lee	Lee Wolfe	Main (Note: Recurring in pilot episode, main thereafter.)	Main	
Chris Parnell	Fred Shay	Recurring	Main	Main

=== Main cast ===
- Jeremy Sisto as George Altman, a single father and architect from New York City, who decides to move upstate to the suburbs wanting a better life for his daughter, Tessa.
- Jane Levy as Tessa Altman, George's daughter, who is less than thrilled about her new suburban surroundings. She maintains a romanticized idea of living in the city.
- Carly Chaikin as Dalia Oprah Royce, a materialistic and fashion-driven valley girl in the popular group at school who becomes Tessa's rival.
- Allie Grant as Lisa Marie Shay LeFrique, Tessa's best friend. She is rather awkward and often very embarrassed by her family.
- Alan Tudyk as Noah Werner, George's best friend, who is a dentist. He often helps George assimilate into suburban culture, having moved out of the city some years earlier.
- Cheryl Hines as Dallas Royce, Dalia's mother and George's neighbor and later girlfriend.
- Rex Lee as Mr. Wolfe, the school guidance counselor, who is always in a good mood. He is openly gay, after being inspired by Tessa to come out.
- Ana Gasteyer as Sheila Shay, George and Tessa's nosy neighbor who lives directly across the street.
- Chris Parnell as Fred Shay, Sheila's husband and Lisa's father. He is also the adoptive father to Ryan and Victor.

=== Recurring cast ===
- Maestro Harrell as Malik LeFrique, he became good friends with Tessa while working with her on the school newspaper. He has had an on-and-off relationship with Lisa.
- Parker Young as Ryan Shay, the dim-witted football jock and Lisa's often embarrassing older brother. He is the most popular person at school, and appears to be as superficial as most other Chatswin residents. He is Tessa’s main love interest.
- Bunnie Rivera as Carmen, Dallas' housekeeper, who is later hired by Noah.
- Sam Lerner as Evan, a nerdy classmate who had a crush on Dalia.
- Todd Sherry as Tom, father of the twins Kaitlin and Kenzie.
- Gillian Vigman as Jill Werner, Noah's emotionally cold wife, who divorces him in season 2.
- Abbie Cobb as Kimantha, one of Dalia's friends. (seasons 1–2)
- Kara Pacitto and Katelyn Pacitto as Kenzie and Kaitlin, Dalia's friends, who are also twin sisters.
- Malin Åkerman as Alex, George's ex-wife and Tessa's mother. (season 2)
- Miriam Flynn as Helen, Alex's mother, Tessa's Grandmother (seasons 1–2)
- Geoff Pierson as Emmett Altman. George's father, Tessa's grandfather. (season 3)
- Arden Myrin as Jocelyn, an employee at the local country club who is attracted to George. (season 1)
- Jay Mohr as Steven Royce, Dalia's father and Dallas' ex-husband. (seasons 1–2)
- Alicia Silverstone as Eden, George's ex-girlfriend and the surrogate mother of Noah and Jill's child, Opus.
- Thomas McDonell as Scott Strauss, a college-aged crush of Dalia's who becomes Tessa's love interest for a story arc. (seasons 1–2)
- Evan Arnold as Chef Alan, Mr. Wolfe's boyfriend who works as the chef in the high school cafeteria.
- Alex Boling as Alex, Tom's best friend (seasons 1–2)
- Natasha Leggero as Nora, the owner of a pet shop and George's (potential) girlfriend. (season 3)
- Lindsey Shaw as June, Ryan's girlfriend who Tessa feels is a lot like her. (season 3)
- Ely Henry as Reggie, a nerdy student at Chatswin High. (seasons 2–3)
- Bryson Barretto as Victor Ha Shay, a little boy whom the Shays adopt to replace Ryan after he leaves for college. He is especially polite and always eager to please others, especially his foster family. (season 3)

== Development and production ==
The series first appeared on ABC's development slate in October 2010. On January 14, 2011, ABC placed a pilot order, written by Emily Kapnek and directed by Michael Fresco, who also served as executive producers. The half-hour comedy was produced by Warner Bros. Television.

Casting announcements began in February 2011, with Jane Levy the first actor cast, playing the role of Tessa Altman, a Manhattan teen who has been raised for the last fifteen years by a single father, George. Tessa dreads the idea of living in the suburbs. Next to join the series was Alan Tudyk in the role of Noah Werner, George's college buddy and a dentist who moved to the suburbs some years earlier. Allie Grant then joined the series as Lisa Shay, a socially awkward girl at school who befriends Tessa. Jeremy Sisto and Carly Chaikin followed with Sisto playing George Altman, Tessa's architect father who moves her from Manhattan to the suburbs, and Chaikin playing Dalia Royce, Tessa's neighbor who quickly becomes her nemesis at school. Cheryl Hines was next cast in the role of Dallas Royce, a well-to-do housewife and the mother of Dalia. She tells George that her absentee husband (Jay Mohr) "travels a lot". Rex Lee was the last actor cast, playing Mr. Wolfe, Tessa's clueless high school guidance counselor. He was originally a guest star but was upped to a series regular after the pilot. Saturday Night Live (SNL) alumna Ana Gasteyer plays the Altmans' domineering neighbor, Sheila Shay, whom they vainly try to avoid. Fellow SNL alum Chris Parnell plays Fred, her husband, who toes the line. The Shays have two children: Lisa, who is Tessa's closest thing to a friend, and Ryan (Parker Young).

On May 13, 2011, ABC ordered the pilot to series, to air in the fall of the 2011–12 United States network television schedule. Suburgatory premiered on September 28, 2011, and aired on Wednesday nights at 8:30/7:30 central following The Middle. After initially ordering 11 episodes, ABC picked up Suburgatory for a full season on October 13, 2011. On December 16, 2011, it was announced that Alicia Silverstone would have a recurring role as Eden, a potential love interest for single father George. This marked the third time Silverstone and Jeremy Sisto had worked together, since first working on the 1995 American comedy film Clueless, and the 1995 thriller Hideaway.

On March 23, 2012, ABC announced that the series was renewed for the 2012–2013 television season. It would air after Modern Family, on 9:30/8:30 central timeslot replacing the new series The Neighbors which was originally scheduled to air in that timeslot.

Suburgatory was renewed for a third season. However, there were budget cuts due to a reduction in the license fee. Alan Tudyk and Rex Lee did not return as regular cast members, although Tudyk made a few guest appearances. The final season aired on January 15, 2014 until May 14, 2014. The show was canceled in early May 2014. It was reported that Warner Brothers was exploring options for a new home including TBS, but ultimately the show was not shopped to another network.

=== Theme song ===
The theme song, "Pleasant Nightmare", was written by Jared Faber and Emily Kapnek and is sung by Alih Jey. The theme song is slightly different in episode 22 (the last episode of season 1). In the season 2 premiere, Tessa performs a longer version of the song, which she says her mother wrote. George performs the song for Dalia as the season 2 finale ends.

== Location and setting ==
The series takes place in the fictional town of Chatswin. The onscreen map animation displayed in the opening credits zooms in on the affluent New York City suburbs of southern Westchester County as the geographic location of "Chatswin". The Westchester County 914 area code is also referenced in the show. The 10805 postal code of the New Rochelle community is used as the Chatswin postal code of main character George Altman.

The series takes its title from Suburgatory: Twisted Tales from Darkest Suburbia, a book by former CNN Senior Producer Linda Keenan, based in part on her experiences after she moved from New York City to three affluent suburbs, the first of which was in Westchester County. The book, released on October 11, 2011, thirteen days after the show premiered, is described on the front cover as "The Title behind the ABC Sitcom".

== Release ==
=== Broadcast ===
Suburgatory aired on ABC on September 28, 2011 until May 14, 2014.

=== Home media ===
In August 2025, Suburgatory was made available on Howdy, a subscription-based platform owned by Roku. In December 2025, the series was added to Tubi. It was also released on Netflix in February 2026.

== Reception ==
Suburgatory attracted generally positive reviews. The first season holds an 83% rating on Rotten Tomatoes, an average rating of 7.1/10, sampled from reviews from 35 critics. Its consensus reads: "Suburban satires are nothing new, but Suburgatory offers enough abrasive wit and left-field jokes to keep it fresh." Metacritic gives the first season an initial score of 71 out of 100, calculated from reviews from 25 critics. On Rotten Tomatoes, the second season holds a score of 92%, with an average score of 8.1/10, based on 12 reviews, the consensus reads "Suburgatory's second season continues to cleverly balance its cheesy clichés and suburban spoofs." On Rotten Tomatoes, the third season holds a score of 100%, with an average score of 7.2/10, based on eight reviews.

"Kapnek manages to make a show that is both satiric and emotionally engaging", said David Wiegand of the San Francisco Chronicle, "two varieties of comedy [that] don't always work well together". On the other end, Neil Genzlinger of The New York Times blasted the show: "[It] begins with a tenuous premise, uses it to leap to an inaccurate dichotomy and supports that with tired, unfunny stereotypes."

Carly Chaikin received critical praise for her role as Dalia Royce. Critics described her as the series' breakout star. For her performance, Chaikin was nominated for the Critics' Choice Television Award for Best Supporting Actress in a Comedy Series and a Teen Choice Award for Choice TV Villain, among others, but did not win any of them.

=== Ratings ===
The debut episode did well, scoring a 3.3 among the 18–49 demos with 9.81 million viewers tuning in.

Season	Timeslot (ET)	# Ep.	Premiere		Finale		TV Season	Rank	Viewers (in millions)
Season	Timeslot (ET)	# Ep.	Date	Premiere Viewers (in millions)	Date	Finale Viewers (in millions)	TV Season	Rank	Viewers (in millions)
1	Wednesday 8:30 pm	22	September 28, 2011	9.81	May 16, 2012	5.35	2011–2012	#71	7.25
2	Wednesday 9:30 pm Wednesday 8:30 pm (April 3–17)	22	October 17, 2012	7.54	April 17, 2013	5.45	2012–2013	#68	6.63
3	Wednesday 8:30 pm	13	January 15, 2014	5.30	May 14, 2014	5.23	2013–2014	#84	5.51

=== Awards and nominations ===
Suburgatory was nominated for a 2012 People's Choice Award for "Favorite New TV Comedy", but lost to 2 Broke Girls, another show from Warner Bros. Television.

Year	Award	Category	Recipients and nominees	Outcome
2012	People's Choice Award	Favorite New TV Comedy	Suburgatory	Nominated
2012	Critics' Choice Television Award	Best Comedy Supporting Actress	Cheryl Hines	Nominated
2012	PAAFTJ Television Awards	Best Directing for a Comedy Series	Alex Hardcastle for "Thanksgiving"	Nominated
2012	PAAFTJ Television Awards	Best Production Design in a Comedy Series	Joseph P. Lucky for "Pilot"	Nominated
2013	Critics' Choice Television Award	Best Actor in a Comedy Series	Jeremy Sisto	Nominated
2013	Critics' Choice Television Award	Best Comedy Supporting Actress	Carly Chaikin	Nominated
2013	Teen Choice Awards	Choice TV Show: Comedy	Suburgatory	Nominated
2013	Teen Choice Awards	Choice TV Villain	Carly Chaikin	Nominated
2013	PAAFTJ Television Awards	Best Comedy Series	Suburgatory	Nominated
2013	PAAFTJ Television Awards	Best Writing for a Comedy Series	Andrew Guest for "Chinese Chicken"	Nominated
2013	PAAFTJ Television Awards	Best Supporting Actor in a Comedy Series	Parker Young	Nominated
2013	PAAFTJ Television Awards	Best Supporting Actress in a Comedy Series	Carly Chaikin	Nominated
2013	PAAFTJ Television Awards	Best Cast in a Comedy Series	Jeremy Sisto, Jane Levy, Carly Chaikin, Allie Grant, Cheryl Hines, Ana Gasteyer, Chris Parnell, Alan Tudyk, Rex Lee, Parker Young	Nominated
2013	PAAFTJ Television Awards	Best Artistic/Visual Achievement in a Comedy Series	Todd Dos Reis, Joseph P. Lucky, Archie D’Amico, Ann Marie Luddy & Danielle Launzel for "The Wishbone"	Nominated

== International broadcasts ==
The series has been picked up in Canada by City, where it is simulcast with the ABC broadcasts. In Latin America the series premiered on October 31, 2011, on Warner Channel. The show premiered on January 3 in Sweden on Kanal 5. In the Republic of Ireland the show began broadcasting on RTÉ Two from March 21, 2012 airing Wednesdays at 19:00. In Spain, it premiered on Cosmopolitan TV on January 13, 2012. The series began airing on the Nine Network's GO! Channel in Australia from February 5, 2012, until it was taken off air in 2012–2013 after poor ratings losing to 7TWO, The Comedy Channel from Foxtel now airs the sitcom. It premiered in Serbia on Serbian HBO Comedy on February 27, 2012, the Serbian name of the show is Čistilište u predgrađu. It also premiered in Poland on Polish HBO Comedy, on February 27, 2012, as Podmiejski czyściec (Suburban Purgatory). The show began airing in New Zealand on TV2 on February 14, 2012. In the United Kingdom, Suburgatory started airing on Channel 4's digital channel E4 from July 17, 2012. For Germany, ProSiebenSat.1 has picked up the series and will start airing it on Wednesday nights beginning on August 29. It is also shown in Denmark on TV2 Zulu. In Portugal, it was aired Monday to Friday, at 18:30, from November 22, 2012, until December 21, 2012, on RTP2. In Brazil, the show premiered on January 3, 2013, at 3:30 AM in the SBT. In Greece the show premiered on July 15, 2013, on Star Channel airing Monday to Friday at 2:30 PM, airing the first 2 Seasons. In Asia, the show started airing on Star World from January 16, 2014. The show also aired briefly, on Malaysia's, NTV7 in 2013. In France, the show premiered on Canal+ Family on May 3, 2013. The series finale aired on March 23, 2015. The show also aired on HD1 from April 24, 2014.

== Reunion ==
In January 2026, Jane Levy, Parker Young, Carly Chaikin and creator Emily Kapnek reunited during an interview for Vulture. When asked about a pitch for the show's revival, Kapnek replied that it would involve a return to Chatswin. She explained, "The idea of Tessa coming back to Chatswin with one of her own — there’s a lot of fun opportunities there. And weirdly, a lot of people in our cast have hit me up about this. I’m not sure if network TV is ready for Suburgatory Pt. 2, but it would be delightful!"
