= Emily Kapnek =

American actress (born 1972)

- Born: March 27, 1972 (age 54); Manhattan, New York, U.S.
- Occupations: Writer, actress, television producer
- Years active: 1996–present
- Known for: Creator of As Told by Ginger, Suburgatory, and Selfie
- Spouse: Dan Lagana (m. 2008)
- Children: 2 sons

Emily Kapnek (born March 27, 1972) is an American television writer, producer and voice actress. Kapnek is best known for creating the animated program As Told by Ginger as well as the television series Suburgatory and Selfie. She was a consulting producer on the television series Parks and Recreation and has written the theme songs for several shows.

== Career ==
Before her career in television writing began, Kapnek wrote the story and script for the 1996 adventure comedy edutainment computer game The Pink Panther: Passport to Peril, which she also partially designed, when she was age 23-24. She collaborated with composer Jared Faber in writing lyrics for the game's music, and they each voice-acted supporting characters in the game. She returned to write the script for the sequel, The Pink Panther: Hokus Pokus Pink, published in 1997, once again collaborating with Faber for both the soundtrack and supporting voiceover roles.

In 1999, Kapnek rose to mainstream prominence as the creator of the Nickelodeon animated series As Told by Ginger which was produced by Eryk Casemiro, Gábor Csupó, and Arlene Klasky. Kapnek also voiced the character of Noelle Sussman. In 2005, Kapnek had two pilots produced. Wiener Park starred Donal Logue and Fred Willard for FOX and Emily's Reasons Why Not for ABC, which starred Heather Graham and was based on a novel of the same name. The latter was picked up to series and premiered on January 9, 2006, but was cancelled after the first episode.

In 2007, Kapnek wrote and was a consulting producer for Aliens in America, which aired on The CW. In 2008, Kapnek wrote a pilot for Fox titled The Emancipation of Ernesto, which starred Wilmer Valderrama.

In 2009, Kapnek served as a co-executive producer and wrote two episodes for the HBO show Hung which premiered on June 28, 2009, and ran for three seasons. From 2010 to 2011, Kapnek was a consulting producer on the third season of the NBC series Parks and Recreation, which starred Amy Poehler and Nick Offerman. Kapnek penned the episode "Ron and Tammy Part Two." In January 2011, it was announced ABC had picked up the pilot for Suburgatory, a show which Kapnek created. The series starred Jeremy Sisto and Jane Levy. Suburgatory premiered on September 28, 2011 and ran for three seasons. She had a Warner Bros. Television-affiliated production company called Piece of Pie Productions. In the same year, Kapnek created Selfie, which starred Karen Gillan and John Cho. Selfie ran for just one season but developed a cult following after its cancellation. There were talks of a Selfie movie revival in 2023, but Warner Bros declined to release the film rights. In 2015, Kapnek was given a pilot commitment for Front Man, a new FOX series created by Kapnek, which would have been produced by Elizabeth Banks, and Max Handelman. However, the pilot did not move to production. In 2018, Kapnek wrote and produced the ABC pilot Splitting Up Together, starring Jenna Fischer and Oliver Hudson which was picked up to series and ran for two seasons on ABC.

Kapnek's new banner, Specifica Productions, launched in 2019 as part of her deal with ABC Studios, a three-year contract. Her former production company was Piece of Pie Productions, which worked with Warner Bros. Television. In February 2020, an ABC pilot order was signed for a show starring Quintessa Swindell for Wild Child, but there were no further developments on the project. In November 2021, it was reported that Kapnek is working again with Selfie star Karen Gillan and Danny Elfman on a musical animation for Disney+ called Rhona Who Lives by the River. In July 2026, it was announced that Emily Kapnek will be the showrunner and writer for the HBO series Alan Opts Out, which is based on the book by Courtney Maum.

== Personal life ==
In December 2008, Emily Kapnek married Dan Lagana. They have two children, Oszkar Nosek and Guy Lagana.

Kapnek is Jewish.

== Filmography ==
Year	Title	Credited as			Notes
Year	Title	Creator	Writer	Executive producer	Notes
1996	The Pink Panther: Passport to Peril	No	Yes	No	Computer game, also partial designer, voice actress and song lyricist
1997	The Pink Panther: Hokus Pokus Pink	No	Yes	No	Computer game, also partial designer, voice actress and song lyricist
1998–1999	Hercules	No	Yes	No	2 episodes
1999	Rocket Power	No	Yes	No	2 episodes
2000	Psyko Ferret	No	Teleplay	No	Television short
2000	The Wild Thornberrys	No	Yes	No	1 episode ("Monkey See, Monkey Don't")
2000	Noah Knows Best	No	Yes	No	3 episodes
2000–2006	As Told by Ginger	Yes	Yes	Yes	As writer (14 episodes); As co-executive producer (22 episodes); As executive producer (12 episodes); Also consulting producer (23 episodes); Also voiced Noelle Sussman (6 episodes)
2001	Pepper Ann	No	Yes	No	2 episodes
2001	The Wacky Adventures of Ronald McDonald	No	Yes	No	1 episode ("Have Time, Will Travel"); Additional material by ("Birthday World")
2005	The Legend of Frosty the Snowman	No	Yes	No	Direct-to-video; Also creative producer
2005	Wiener Park	No	Yes	Yes	Pilot
2006	Emily's Reasons Why Not	Developed by	Yes	Yes	As writer (2 episodes); As executive producer (6 episodes)
2007–2008	Aliens in America	No	Yes	No	As writer (3 episodes); Also consulting producer (17 episodes)
2008	The Emancipation of Ernesto	Yes	Yes	Yes	Pilot
2009	Hung	No	Yes	Co-executive	As writer (2 episodes); As co-executive producer (9 episodes)
2010–2011	Parks and Recreation	No	Yes	No	1 episode ("Ron & Tammy: Part Two"); Also consulting producer (23 episodes)
2011–2014	Suburgatory	Yes	Yes	Yes	Also director ("Stray Dogs"); As writer (10 episodes); As executive producer (11 episodes)
2014	Selfie	Yes	Yes	Yes	As writer (2 episodes); As executive producer (13 episodes)
2018–2019	Splitting Up Together	Developed by	Yes	Yes	Based on the Danish series Bedre skilt end aldrig As writer (3 episodes); As executive producer (26 episodes)
TBA	Rhona Who Lives by the River †	Yes	Yes	Yes	Post-production
