= Jared Faber =

American composer

- Also known as: J-Radical
- Origin: Los Angeles, California, U.S.
- Genres: Electronica; alternative; experimental
- Occupations: Musician, composer, producer
- Instruments: Guitar, keyboard, bass, vocals, drums
- Years active: 1996–present
- Label: Blind Lemon Music
- Website: www.jaredfaber.com

Jared Faber (also known as J-Radical) is an American musician, composer, and producer who works primarily in television and film. He composed the theme songs for Oobi, As Told by Ginger, Emily's Reasons Why Not, and Suburgatory. He has won multiple Grammy Awards and been nominated for an Emmy Award.

== Career ==
Faber was raised in New York City, where he attended High School of Performing Arts, and later continued his music education at Berklee College of Music, studying jazz arranging and composition. He is half of the production team Urban Legend, with partner Kool Kojak, and founded the label "Blind Lemon Music". Faber resides and is established working in Los Angeles.

Faber's first professional credits are the soundtracks for the adventure educational PC video games The Pink Panther: Passport to Peril and The Pink Panther: Hokus Pokus Pink, with lyrics by Emily Kapnek, who also wrote the scripts for both video games and would go on to frequently collaborate with him on their work in television.

Faber composed the music for the ABC series Emily's Reasons Why Not starring Heather Graham. In addition to the episodic scoring, Faber co-wrote the theme song with series creator Kapnek, which was performed by R&B singer Macy Gray. Faber and Kapnek collaborated again for Kapnek's next ABC series Suburgatory, for which they wrote the theme song "Pleasant Nightmare", performed by Alih Jey.

Faber's forays into Latin music have led to him scoring the Fox pilot “Ernesto” starring Wilmer Valderrama, which had a decidedly Mexican style as well as collaborating with Valderrama and Rosario Dawson on the viral web series, "Voto Latino".

Faber contributed music to the film The Long Shots starring Ice Cube, featuring its song Faber co-wrote and produced, performed by Chris Pierce and Sy Smith.

== Credits ==
=== Television ===
Title	Role	Producer	Network
Suburgatory	Score and theme song composer	Warner Bros.	ABC
Emily's Reasons Why Not	Score and theme song composer	Sony/Pariah	ABC
Oobi	Score and theme song composer	Little Airplane Productions	Noggin; Nickelodeon
As Told by Ginger (2000-06)	Score and theme song composer	Klasky Csupo	Nickelodeon
Clifford's Puppy Days	Score and theme song composer	Scholastic Entertainment	PBS
Kenny the Shark	Score and theme song composer	Discovery Kids	NBC
Bear in the Big Blue House	Score composer	Jim Henson Productions	Disney Channel
The Mr. Men Show	Score composer	Renegade Animation	Cartoon Network
Ernesto	Score composer	20th Century Fox	FOX
Friday: The Animated Series	Score composer	CubeVision	MTV
Being Bobby Brown	Score composer	B2 Productions	Bravo
Garage Boy	Score composer	KaBlam!	Nickelodeon
Leold	Score composer	Olive Jar Animation	N/A
Goldie and Boy Koi	Score composer	Nickelodeon Creative Lab	Nickelodeon
I Am Poem	Score composer	Nickelodeon Creative Lab	Nickelodeon
The Epic Tales of Captain Underpants	Score composer	DreamWorks Animation	Netflix
CSI Miami	Featured song	CBS Productions	CBS
Dexter	Featured music	Showtime	CBS/Showtime
Indie 101	Featured music	MTV	MTV3
Nip/Tuck	Featured music	FX	FX
High School Stories	Featured music	MTV	MTV
Taina (2001–02)	Additional music	Dorado Ent.	Nickelodeon
Sheep in the Big City	Additional music	Curious Pictures	Cartoon Network
The Tiny Chef Show	Score composer	Imagine Kids+Family; Tiny Chef Productions	Nickelodeon

- * 2006 Emmy nomination for excellence in music composition-direction

=== Film ===
Title	Role	Director	Studio/Production Co.
Mardi Gras	Composer	Phil Dornfeld	Sony Pictures / Screen Gems
The Long Shots	Additional music	Fred Durst	Dimension / MGM
The Legend of Frosty the Snowman (2005)	Score composer	Gregg Sullivan	Classic Media
Holly Hobbie and Friends	Song and score composer	Mario Piluso	Nickelodeon
Catch That Kid	Featured music	Bart Freundlich	20th Century Fox
Drop Back 10	Score Composer	Stacy composer	Independent
Elefun & Friends: A Tangled Tale	Score composer	Darrell Van Citters	Renegade Animation
Bartok the Magnificent	Music Production Supervisor	Don Bluth	20th Century Fox
Lamb to the Slaughter	Score composer	Nicole Barnett	Independent
Amazing Me	Score composer	Chris Linn	Stand Back Productions
Teen Titans Go! To the Movies (2018)	Score composer	Peter Rida Michail; Aaron Horvath	Warner Bros.

=== Video games ===
Title	Role	Developer	Distributor
The Pink Panther: Passport to Peril	Song and Score Composer	Wanderlust Interactive	BMG Interactive (now known as Rockstar Games)
The Pink Panther: Hokus Pokus Pink	Song and Score Composer	Pink Wanderlust Interactive	BMG Interactive (now known as Rockstar Games)
The Magic School Bus Explores the Human Body	Composer and Sound Designer	Music Pen/Scholastic	Microsoft
Wiggins in Storyland	Song and Score Composer	Music Pen	Virgin Interactive
Lenny's Time Machine	Composer and Sound Designer	Music Pen	Viacom Interactive
Lenny's Multimedia Circus	Song and Score Composer	Music Pen	Viacom Interactive
Coolsville (Unreleased)	Song and Score Composer	Music Pen	MediaVision

== Discography ==
Title/Artist	Role	Label
Beto Cuevas – Transformación	Writer/Producer	Warner Latino
Urban Legend – Tropical Techniques	Writer/Producer	Blind Lemon Music
Urban Legend – Tranquilidad Cubana	Writer/Producer	Blind Lemon Music
La Bruja – For Witch it Stands	Writer/Producer	1830 Records
2007 LAMC Compilation (Latin Alternative Music Conf.)	Writer/Producer	Nacional Records
Holmes – Stop Go	Guitar/Bass	GG
Queer Eye 4 the Straight Guy Premium Compilation	Writer/Producer	Sugo
Monte La Rue Deluxe 2 – Various Artists	Writer/Producer	United
Café Samba – Various Artists	Writer/Producer	Varese Records
Brazil Remixed – Various Artists	Writer/Producer	Groove Gravy Records
Hot Melodi – NuJazz Lounge Vol. 1	Writer/Producer	EQ Music
Masterworks Reworked – Various Artists	Writer/Producer	Groove Gravy Records
Nu Jazz Sessions (vol. 1 & 2) – Various Artists	Writer/Producer	Groove Gravy Records
Chill Pil (vol. 1 & 2) – Various Artists	Writer/Producer	Groove Gravy Records
Tao of Groove – Fresh Goods	Guitar/Bass	Groove Gravy Records
Freedom Bremner – House of Freedom	Producer	N/A
Depression Blues – Various Artists	Writer/Producer/Guitar	Delta Music
Roy Shakked: A Funky Little Christmas	Guitar	Delta Music
Soundtrack to Pink Panther's Passport to Peril	Writer/Producer/Guitar/Keyboards	Laser Light
Michael Gaylord – History Remembers	Guitar	Independent
Marti Jones – My Tidy Doily Dream	Writer	Dixon Archival
Jazz Delicious – Various Artists	Writer/Producer	S2S
El Condor Pasa	Guitar	Dimelo! Records
Best of Nick Tunes – Various Artists	Writer/Producer	Rhino Records
