= Carrie Gerlach Cecil =

American writer and businessperson

- Education: Arizona State University
- Spouse: Chuck Cecil
- Children: 1
- Writing career
- Genre: Fiction

Carrie Gerlach Cecil is an American writer, television show producer, public speaker, and businessperson. She wrote the novel on which the television show Emily's Reasons Why Not was based.

== Early life and education ==
Carrie Gerlach grew up in Phoenix and Tucson, Arizona. She attended Sabino High School, where she was a cheerleader. She attended the University of Arizona in Tucson where she met her future husband, Chuck Cecil; however, their relationship did not hold, and she later transferred to Arizona State University.

She eventually relocated to New York, after visiting The Hamptons. She was an intern at MTV in the 1980s.

Gerlach moved to Los Angeles and started working at a Hollywood public relations firm. She left that job and worked for Turner Network Television. She also provided independent public relations work, providing support for the movies Air Force One and Return to Paradise in the 1990s. During that time, Gerlach and Chuck Cecil reestablished contact and their relationship. The two eventually married and moved to Nashville, Tennessee when Cecil got a coaching job for the Tennessee Titans.

== Career ==
Gerlach Cecil is the CEO of a communications firm and founded a social media training and education firm for athletes. She authored the 2004 Emily's Reasons Why Not, which was turned into an ABC television show and cancelled after one episode.

She also wrote a Christian-themed book titled One Sunday.

She writes a football-related column for the Arizona Daily Star and did a feature on her husband Chuck Cecil's legendary play intercepting a ball in the end zone and running it all the way back more than 100 yards for a touchdown to seal a team victory.

She was involved in the proposed Divas for Jesus television show.

== Personal life ==
She is married to Chuck Cecil, a University of Arizona football hall of fame player, NFL player, and coach. They have one daughter and have lived in Manhattan Beach, California when Chuck Cecil has not been coaching.
