= Bedre skilt end aldrig =

- Genre: Comedy drama
- Created by: Mette Heeno
- Starring: Maria Rossing; Peter Plaugborg
- Country of origin: Denmark
- Original language: Danish
- No. of seasons: 1
- No. of episodes: 8

Production
- Executive producers: Mie Andreasen, Pernille Bech Christensen, Mette Heeno

Original release
- Release: 29 February 2016 – present

Bedre skilt end aldrig (translated "Better divorced than never") is a Danish comedy-drama TV series on TV 2.

The series was premiered at the Berlin Film Festival in January 2016 and then aired on TV2 in Denmark. It was nominated for several Robert Awards (the Danish equivalent of the Oscar award) in 2017.

== Premise ==
The series tells the story of a married couple with two young girls who decide to end their relationship, but take turns living with the girls in the house they have together, on alternating weeks living solo in the basement.

== Cast ==
- Maria Rossing as Line
- Peter Plaugborg as Martin

== Episodes ==
- Episode 1 (29 February 2016) – Line and Martin invite family and friends over to tell them of their divorce, but not all of their guests think it is a good idea.
- Episode 2 (7 March 2016) – Line has a basement week and meets secretly with a co-worker. She is ready to embark on new adventure and love, while Martin desperately struggles to keep track of houses, kids and herself in the upstairs. He wonders if he is ready for divorce.
- Episode 3 (14 March 2016) – Line has a children's weekend and has snapped the author Kasper into the house, but feels guilty, especially having a stranger staying next to the children. At the same time, Martin realizes that he was not completely finished with Line, and he has to fight hard to win her attention before it's too late.
- Episode 4 (4 April 2016) – Line is caught in bed with Kasper in front of the children. Martin and Line are seriously unfriendly, and Martin takes on Rune while he leaves the babysitting of the children to Line's parents who come to sleep. Line's sister Maja announces that she wants to be inseminated and needs help in findining a donor. The cozy family evening is challenged, as not everyone is excited about the idea of donor children and new family forms.
- Episode 5 (11 April 2016) – Line has gathered the old mothers group for Christmas lunch, and Martin has promised to take care of the girls in the basement while Line is partying in the living room. Not everyone knows Line has been divorced, and now she must defend her decision to the girlfriends, who do not all believe in the idea of a 'happy divorce'.
- Episode 6 (18 April 2016) – Line has a basement week, but a strange woman, Charlotte, knocks on the door looking for Martin. Line does not like a new woman in the house and suddenly afraid of losing her family.
- Episode 7 (25 April 2016) – Martin has a basement week and has a visit from Charlotte, but feels guilty towards Line, who is upstairs in the house with the children.
- Episode 8 (2 May 2016) – It is Christmas Eve, and Line has planned the perfect evening for her family. She wants Martin to come but then he invites Charlotte and her son over as they have no other places to be Christmas Eve. Line's despair grows, especially since the whole family, including her two children, turns out to be more than excited about Charlotte, who is both beautiful and sweet and can play piano.

== International remakes ==
=== Belgium: #hetisingewikkeld ===
A Flemish language remake entitled #hetisingewikkeld (translated "#itscomplicated") aired in 2017 on channel 4 in Belgium. It stars Ann Miller and Ben Segers as the title characters. A second season, which was self-written, premiered in 2019.

=== United States: Splitting Up Together ===
An American remake was created in 2018 called Splitting Up Together. The remake largely follows the story line of the Danish series, with a few changes (i.e. the child-free parent lives in the detached garage instead of the basement and instead of two girls, their children are two boys and a girl).
