= Guajiro (band) =

US musical group

Güajiro (pronounced, ‘wah-HEE-roh’) are a Hialeah, Florida-based rock band, composed of members Jorge Gonzalez Graupera (bass, backing vocals), William Lopez (guitar, lead vocals), Douglas Mackinnon (drums, percussion) and David Santos (guitar). They are signed to I Scream Records. They were the US representatives of the Rally MTV reality TV series.

== History ==
The band was formed by Lopez and Mackinnon in early 2005 as a hobby after spending years away from the music scene (Mackinnon played in The Vandals and Slapshot. Lopez was the singer of Friction Wheel). By mid-2005 a self-titled EP was recorded and released by California label Long Beach Records. They recruited bass player/singer Jorges Gonzalez Graupera and later, guitar player David Santos. Shortly after that in June, the band was invited by MTV to participate in a reality TV show called Rally MTV which followed five bands racing across South America.

== Discography ==
Guajiro - (2005) Self titled - EP

- Produced by Jorge “Tereso” Correa
- Mixed by Darian Rundall
- Recorded at Espiral Recording, Miami, Florida
- Mastered by Don Tyler at Precision Mastering, Hollywood, CA

Material Subversivo – (2007) – LP

- Produced by Darian Rundall
- Mixed by Darian Rundall
- Recorded at Espiral Recording, Miami, Fl
- Mastered by Gene Grimaldi at Oasis Mastering, Burbank, CA
- Featured musicians: Julio “El Peregrino” Martinez – Tres on “Soy Guajiro Part I & II, Randy Bradbury (bass) on “Dos Principes”, Chris Bradford – Acoustic Guitars on “Dos Principes”, Aruan y Arelan Torres – Vocals on “ Soy Guajiro Part I” and “Santa Fe”, Percussion (Timbata) on “Soy Guajiro Part I”, “Santa Fe”, “Mulatona” and “En Bori”, Gil Joker – Vocals on “Soy Guajiro Part I & II” and “Bandera”, Harold Bosch– Vocals on “Delinquente”, Frank Lopez – Vocals on ”Delinquente”

== Line-up ==
This is considered to be the essential line-up of Guajiro. It is with these members that the band has achieved artistic and commercial success:

- Jorge Gonzalez Graupera – bass, backing vocals
- William Lopez – guitar, lead vocals, rusty trombone
- Douglas Mackinnon – drums, percussion
- David Santos – Guitar

=== Other members ===
- Ariel Gonzalez – guitar
- Luis Castellanos – bass
- Joe Koontz - guitar
