= Emily's Reasons Why Not =

Television sitcom

- Khary Payton as Josh, Heather Graham as Emily, and Nadia Dajani as Reilly
- Genre: Sitcom
- Based on: Emily's Reasons Why Not by Carrie Gerlach
- Developed by: Emily Kapnek
- Starring: Heather Graham; Nadia Dajani; James Patrick Stuart
- Country of origin: United States
- Original language: English
- No. of seasons: 1
- No. of episodes: 6 (5 unaired in US)

Production
- Executive producers: Vivian Cannon; Emily Kapnek; Gavin Polone; Bill Diamond; Robin Schiff; Ali Adler
- Producers: Carrie Gerlach; Heather Graham; Coral Hawthorne; Michael Patrick Jann
- Running time: 30 minutes
- Production companies: Pariah Television; Sony Pictures Television

Original release
- Network: ABC
- Release: January 9, 2006

Emily's Reasons Why Not is an American television sitcom starring Heather Graham. The show, which was based on the novel of the same name by Carrie Gerlach, published in August 2004, was canceled by its broadcaster, ABC, after a single airing on January 9, 2006. The story revolves around Emily Sanders, a successful career woman in Los Angeles who has been unsuccessful dating. She seeks help from a therapist who recommends that Emily make a list of ten reasons why each of her dating relationships has failed.

The series premise centered on Emily (Graham), an editor of self-help books who is unable to find success in romance. In the premiere episode she ends a bad relationship and adopts a new rule for her romances: if she can list five reasons to break up with a guy, then she does so. Emily gets help from her friends, among them Josh, whose character is strongly based on gay stereotypes. The show was widely considered a less risqué copycat of Sex and the City.

== First episode ==
In the first episode, she is convinced that the man she was dating was gay when he was actually a devout Mormon practicing chastity before marriage. His open virginity is presented through gay stereotypes, and his preferred sport, Brazilian jiu-jitsu is described as "the gayest sport there is" by Emily's former boyfriend.

== Critical reception ==
It was reported that ABC committed to the show before seeing a script. Despite heavy promotion by both Sony Pictures Television and ABC, and a viewing average of 6.2 million viewers, the show was pulled after the first episode due to negative reception; production was stopped after filming six episodes. ABC was said to have spent millions on promotion, including airtime, billboards and radio ads, and considered Emily to be the "linchpin" of the network's post-football Monday-night schedule. The promotion was so heavy and the cancellation so abrupt that some magazines found themselves carrying cover stories about a canceled show. After viewing it, ABC's entertainment president suggested that they considered the show lackluster and unlikely to improve. The New York Times attributed the cancellation in part to the extremely unappealing nature of the main character and the portrayal by Graham.

In 2006, all six episodes of the show aired on Spain's pay-TV channel Cosmopolitan under the title Cinco razones (para no salir contigo) ("Five Reasons (to not go out with you)"), on Sony Entertainment Television, on ORF1 in Austria, and on POP TV in Slovenia. It also aired on the cable/satellite channel FOX Life, in Japan in 2007, titled in Japanese as Emirī no Renai Baiburu (エミリーの恋愛バイブル, Emirī no Renai Baiburu; "Emily's Love Bible").

== Cast ==
- Emily Sanders (Heather Graham)
- Reilly Harvey (Nadia Dajani)
- Midas O'Shay (James Patrick Stuart)
- Josh (Khary Payton)
- Glitter Cho (Smith Cho)

== Episodes ==
No.	Title	Original release date	Viewers (millions)
1	"Pilot"	January 9, 2006	6.26
2	"Why Not to Date Your Gynecologist"	Unaired	N/A
3	"Why Not to Cheat on Your Best Friend"	Unaired	N/A
4	"Why Not to Date a Twin"	Unaired	N/A
5	"Why Not to Hire a Cute Male Assistant"	Unaired	N/A
6	"Why Not to Invite Your Vacation Date Home"	Unaired	N/A

== Home media ==
Emily's Reasons Why Not – The Complete Series was released on DVD on May 1, 2012. All six episodes produced were included in the set.
