= The Pink Panther: Hokus Pokus Pink =

1997 video game

- Developer: Wanderlust Interactive
- Publisher: Simon & Schuster (North America)
- Artist: Brian Gaidry
- Writer: Emily Kapnek
- Composer: Jared Faber
- Series: The Pink Panther
- Platform: Microsoft Windows
- Release: NA: October 18, 1997
- Genres: Adventure, educational, Point-and-click
- Mode: Single-player

The Pink Panther: Hokus Pokus Pink is a musical adventure computer game for the PC released on October 18, 1997 by Wanderlust Interactive. It is based on the 1993-95 television series The Pink Panther, in which the traditionally non-speaking title character speaks audibly (voiced by Michael Sinterniklaas), and is a sequel to The Pink Panther: Passport to Peril. Like its predecessor, it teaches players about six countries as the Pink Panther explores them, this time to undo the accidental magic of an aspiring boy sorcerer. The places Pink visits are: Siberia in Russia, the Dead Sea in Israel, Borneo in Indonesia, Kenya, and Ancient Greece. In contrast to Passport to Peril, this game does not feature any other regular or recurring characters from the TV series, except for brief cameos from the evil Dogfather's henchmen Pugg and Louie during a musical number about Pegasus.

== Gameplay ==
As in the first game, the player uses point-and-click controls to guide the Pink Panther around areas to interact with characters and objects, solve puzzles, and advance the story. Pink stores useful items he finds in a pouch in his fur, and the inventory can be accessed by clicking on him. The player can also access the Book of Knowledge at any point to read information on the indigenous people, languages, clothing, entertainment, art, history, nature, and foods of each country. Helping Pink travel between locations is Spot, a sentient, speaking black hole that he steals from warlock Strangeblood's magical forest laboratory. The game features five original songs related to animals found in the places Pink visits.

== Plot ==
After the successful events in The Pink Panther: Passport to Peril, the Pink Panther has given up his life as a secret agent for the Inspector and now works as a traveling salesman. However, his more slow-paced life is soon interrupted as Nathan Periowinkle Jr., the son of a wealthy lunatic dentist, inventor, and antique teeth collector, steals utensils from the warlock Strangeblood, who lives in the forest near the family estate. Nathan accidentally transforms Violet, the young daughter of two guests at the Periowinkles' dinner party in their mansion, into a giant, anthropomorphic wombat (with some bat-like physical features). As Pink arrives to sell the Periowinkles a copy of his Book of Knowledge, he encounters Nathan and Violet in Nathan's room; enraged, Nathan magically scatters several of Pink's book pages around the world, unaware that Strangeblood assisted him. After apparently falling unconscious, Pink wakes up believing the encounter to have been a nightmare and learns otherwise when he regains access to Nathan's room. He agrees to find Strangeblood's book of cryptically-worded spell reversals before Nathan's parents find out.

Despite Pink wanting to change her back to normal, Violet wishes to become an "immortal, magical ninja princess mermaid". Upon stealing the magic book and escaping from Strangeblood through Spot, the sorcerer's pet black hole, Pink gathers the ingredients to complete the potion: a mammoth's laugh, a piece of Dead Sea fungus, and an improvised black belt, while receiving unexpected help from Strangeblood to drain the Dead Sea so an ostrich can reunite with his flock. Violet drinks the potion and changes into her ideal form but falls asleep in midair after eating a poisoned apple. Pink then searches for the ingredients to awaken Violet: a feather from a rhinoceros hornbill, and a chant from a Maasai tribal leader. He is revisited on his journey by Strangeblood, who magically reattaches a shark's fins. When the new potion fails, Pink again improvises a third ingredient, this time a Greek salad, and Violet becomes possessed by Echidna of Greek mythology, interrupting the party and demanding audience with Zeus. In Ancient Greece, Pink rescues Athena from being trapped in Zeus's head, tricks two gorgons into turning themselves to stone, and correctly answers questions about Greek myth to convince Echidna's grandfather Poseidon (Note: While Echidna and Poseidon are of no direct relation in the traditional family tree of the Greek gods, other versions of the myth establish her as his granddaughter via Poseidon's son Chrysaor.) to travel with him to the Periowinkles' mansion. Strangeblood arrives at the party and exorcises Echidna, restoring Violet's original form, while Poseidon departs with Echidna.

The party ends with only plastic surgeon Dr. Hemakeyounew and his Frankenstein's Monster-esque wife taking a set of celebrity teeth from the "Stars Byte" collection being auctioned. Dr. Periowinkle and his wife reprimand Nathan for causing so much chaos and threaten to send him to dental school, but Strangeblood consoles Nathan and explains that he intentionally caused the events of the story to test the boy's magical skills, intervening only as necessary. Pink makes a positive case for Nathan by stating that at least the poisoned apple worked as intended. Impressed, Strangeblood recruits Nathan as his apprentice, brainwashes Dr. and Mrs. Periowinkle into agreement, and takes him to his forest laboratory. Pink remarks that, no matter where he goes or what job he pursues, a fantastic adventure will always await him.
