= The Pink Panther: Passport to Peril =

1996 video game

Passport to Peril
- Developer: Wanderlust Interactive
- Publishers: BMG Interactive (USA first edition, France); Simon & Schuster Interactive (USA second edition); Anglia Multimedia (UK); Ravensburger Interactive (Germany)
- Artist: Brian Gaidry
- Writer: Emily Kapnek
- Composer: Jared Faber
- Series: The Pink Panther
- Platform: Windows
- Release: NA: October 1996
- Genres: Adventure, educational, Point-and-click
- Mode: Single-player

The Pink Panther: Passport to Peril is an adventure computer game that teaches players about six countries as the Pink Panther explores them to solve a mystery. The countries Pink visits are: England, Egypt, China, Bhutan, India and Australia. Based on the 1993-95 TV series The Pink Panther, the traditionally non-speaking title character speaks audibly throughout (voiced by Michael Sinterniklaas).

The Pink Panther: Hokus Pokus Pink is a sequel to Passport to Peril that was released on October 18, 1997.

== Gameplay ==
The player uses point-and-click controls to guide the Pink Panther around areas to interact with characters and objects, solve puzzles, and advance the story. Pink stores useful items he finds in a pouch in his fur, and the inventory can be accessed by clicking on him. The player can also access the PDA ("Pink Digital Assistant") at any point to read information on the indigenous people, languages, clothing, entertainment, art, history, nature, and foods of each country Pink visits. Each main topic page in the PDA is hosted by at least one character from the 1993-95 TV series in a cameo.

== Plot ==
The Pink Panther works as a secret agent for the Inspector, who teleports him to Camp Chilly Wa-Wa, a prestigious international summer camp for the gifted children of powerful and influential people at a top-secret location, to ensure the campers stay happy in order to prevent global conflict. Once there, he meets a group of multiethnic youths as well as the counselor. (Note: Portrayed by the Little Man appearing throughout the Pink Panther franchise.) The children include Nigel, Chione, Yung-Li, Ananda, Indrani, and Kumoken. Pink also encounters his scientist friend Helmut Von Schmarty, who shows him his newest inventions, including the Dial-a-Day, which can alter the local weather and time of day. The sinister Dogfather and his henchmen, Pugg and Louie, soon arrive, disguised as agents of the "Better Camping Bureau" and threatening to close the camp if anything goes wrong.

The Dogfather spies on Pink using a secret code to access the basement under the counselor's cabin and find a fishing rod for Nigel, then sets the Dial-a-Day to nighttime and sneaks into the basement while Pink is asleep. When Pink awakens, he finds the children acting strangely and contradictory to their nature, hating the camp and each other despite Pink's efforts to reason with and comfort them. Von Schmarty gives him a PDA ("Pink Digital Assistant") serving as both an information repository and a communication device, and Pink travels to the children's home countries to fulfill various tasks based on their needs and whereabouts while Pugg and Louie attempt to thwart him repeatedly.

Pink first flies to London to retrieve Nigel's Guy Fawkes dummy, dressing up as a nobleman to converse with Nigel's father, Sir Manly MP. (Note: Sir Manly is portrayed by the stock character "Manly Man" as he appears in the 1993 animated series.) In the family country house, Pink finds a postcard from Nigel, a champion speller, riddled with spelling errors. Though Pugg and Louie steal Pink's fur, he stuns them with reflected sunlight and takes it back at Stonehenge. In Cairo, Pink makes a chain of deals to get provisions for a local man and receive his help in searching along the Nile for the missing Chione. He discovers a hieroglyphics letter to her parents saying she is enjoying the camp and never left, and later goads the dogs into falling into a pit trap.

After returning to the decaying Chilly Wa-Wa, Pink flies to Beijing to find out why the normally multilingual Yung-Li is only speaking Mandarin and keeps repeating a phrase. He is mistaken for an opera singer, survives a mock-kung fu fight with the dogs, and helps one of Yung-Li's brothers retrieve his pet parakeet before learning the translated phrase from Yung-Li's father in his rice paddy village. On Pink's subsequent flight to India, Pugg and Louie hijack the airplane, prompting him to escape by parachute to Thimphu. Gaining the favor of Ananda's father, the King of Bhutan, in an archery contest, Pink travels by helicopter to Bombay, then by train to Varanasi, where he places flowers in the Ganges to honor Indrani's late grandfather.

Pink returns to the camp again to find the Dial-a-Day tampered with and Von Schmarty acting unusually irritable and short-circuiting like a robot. He tries flying to Australia to identify an anthropomorphic crocodile that also left the camp but ends up parachuting into the Pacific Ocean when Pugg and Louie seize the plane again. Kumoken's Aboriginie father rescues Pink and ferries him to the Outback, where Pink helps around Kumoken's family village. The crocodile, Kumoken's spirit totem, silently warns him that the children need him back at the camp, now in a dystopic state with parts of robotic clones of the children strewn about.

Ultimately, Pink gathers enough evidence to prove that the Dogfather replaced the children and Von Schmarty with robots programmed to hate the camp so he could ruin its reputation and open a "Dogburger" fast food restaurant in its place. The dogs and the counselor, who was blackmailed into working with them, pursue Pink around the camp, but Pink uses one of Von Schmarty's powered vacuum cleaners to capture the four and drain the lake, freeing the real children and Von Schmarty. With the camp restored, Pink quits working for the Inspector after being told his next mission is an undercover cafeteria worker.

== Soundtrack ==
The Pink Panther: Passport to Peril Original Soundtrack

Soundtrack album by Various Artists
- Released: October 21, 1997
- Genres: Pop; rock; jazz; gospel; disco

The game's soundtrack, released on CD on October 21, 1997, features nine original songs with lyrics by Emily Kapnek and music by Jared Faber, as well as a 1990s pop-rock arrangement of "The Pink Panther Theme" by Faber, which was meant to play during the game's opening cutscene, though the in-game version was slightly altered to avoid legal complications. All songs were recorded at City Sound in New York City. Seven of them relate to the histories and cultures of the countries visited in the game.

Track listing
No.	Title	Writer(s)	Performed by	Length
1.	"The Pink Panther Theme"	Henry Mancini	Jared Faber (arr.)	0:52
2.	"In Bhutan"	Emily Kapnek, Faber	Faber, John Montagna, Michael Sinterniklaas	2:49
3.	"Taj Mahal"	Kapnek, Faber	Jason Paige, Lisa Gentile	2:49
4.	"Mummification"	Kapnek, Faber	C.E. Smith, Shawna Kemp	3:36
5.	"Fawkes Day"	Kapnek, Faber	Neil Stewart	1:26
6.	"Dreamtime"	Kapnek, Faber	Montagna	5:21
7.	"The Caste System"	Kapnek, Faber	Smith, Tayla, Brian Gaidry	3:47
8.	"China's Billion"	Kapnek, Faber	Lisa DeSimone, Kapnek	1:51
9.	"Chilly Wa-Wa Finale (Trapped in a Bubble)"	Kapnek, Faber	Michelle Medlin, Sinterniklaas, Evan Faber (Note: Evan Faber is Jared Faber's son.), Ona Tzar, Kapnek	1:33
10.	"Same Black Sky"	Kapnek, Faber	Rosanne Drucker (Note: Rosanne Drucker is the sister of fellow musician Leon Drucker, professionally known as Lee Rocker.)	5:11
Total length:				29:49
