= Mikhail Lesin =

Russian political advisor (1958–2015)

- Михаил Лесин
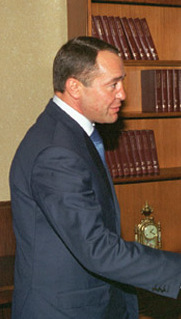
- Lesin in 2002

Minister of Press and Mass Media
- In office 6 July 1999 – 9 March 2004
- Prime Minister: Vladimir Putin; Mikhail Kasyanov
- Preceded by: Ivan Laptev (as head of the Committee for Mass Media)
- Succeeded by: Mikhail Seslavinsky (as head of the Federal Agency for Mass Media)

Head of the Presidential Office for Public Relations
- In office 14 September 1996 – 10 March 1997
- President: Boris Yeltsin
- Preceded by: Office established
- Succeeded by: Mikhail Margelov

Personal details
- Born: 11 July 1958 Moscow, RSFSR, Soviet Union
- Died: 5 November 2015 (aged 57) Washington, D.C., United States
- Resting place: Los Angeles, California, United States

Mikhail Yuryevich Lesin (Russian: Михаил Юрьевич Лесин; 11 July 1958 – 5 November 2015) was a Russian political figure, media executive and advisor to president Vladimir Putin. In 2006, he was awarded the Order "For Merit to the Fatherland", one of Russia's highest state decorations for civilians. Lesin was nicknamed the Bulldozer (Russian: Бульдозер) because of his ability to get virtually all Russian media outlets under the Kremlin's control, and for being combative in person.

Lesin died in a Washington, D.C., hotel room under unusual circumstances. His family initially said the cause of death was a heart attack, but after a year-long investigation Washington's chief medical examiner and federal authorities released a joint statement saying Lesin died of blunt-force trauma to his head, induced by falls amid acute ethanol intoxication. A leaked report by Christopher Steele for the FBI said Lesin was bludgeoned to death by men working for an oligarch close to Putin.

== Biography ==
Lesin was born in Moscow to a Jewish family involved in military construction. He spent his childhood years in Mongolia while his father, Yuri, worked on military construction projects.

From 1976 to 1978, Lesin served in the Soviet Army and Soviet Naval Infantry (Marines Corps) of the USSR Armed Forces. In 1984, he graduated from the Moscow Engineering and Construction Institute (Note: Since 15 June 1993, the Moscow Engineering and Construction Institute (Russian: Московский инженерно-строительный институт им. В.В. Куйбышева (МИСИ им. В.В. Куйбышева)) is known as the Moscow State Construction University (Russian: Национальный исследовательский университе́т Московский государственный строительный университет (НИУ МГСУ).) in Yaroslavsky as a civil engineer. From 1982 to 1987, he worked in engineering at Minpromstroy (Industrial construction ministry) in Moscow and in Ulan Bator. From 1988 to 1989, he was deputy director for Production of television programs of the Creative Production Association "Game Appliances". From 1990 to 1993, he was Director of Youth creative production of the TV company RTV. In the late 1980s, he directed the television show Funny Guys (Весёлые ребята).

In the late 1980s, the New York firm National Video Industry attempted to establish its Moscow subsidiary Video Industry but could not obtain a proper registration although the firm had printed stationery and stored them in Moscow warehouses. In 1988, as head of the Alexander Zavenovich Akopov (Russian: Александр Завенович Акопов) founded 1988 cooperative "Igrotekhnika" (Russian: "Игротехника") which produced television shows, Lesin became aware of the items, obtained them, and with support from Yuri Zapol (Russian: Юрий Михайлович Заполь), Akopov, and others he established Video International through Ingrotekhnika and RTR (Russia Television and Radio which is often called Russia) (Russian: РТР) and obtained a studio in Spain to upgrade its video equipment and editing techniques after the horrible presentation in Russia of the 1992 Olympics in Barcelona. In the early 1990s, Lesin established Video International, which became a multibillion-dollar advertising agency with exclusive advertising rights on NTV and in 2015 was still one of Russia's largest agencies. In 1994, he left Video International. From 1993 to 1996, he was Head of Commercial Department, Deputy General Director and General Director of RIA Novosti. At this position in Novosti, he was pivotal in the Russian parliamentary elections of 1995 and especially the re-election campaign of Yeltsin in the 1996 Russian presidential elections. He began the slogan "Voice of the Heart", authored "I believe, I do, I hope" and "Save and Protect", and provided the president's weekly radio address to the country. From September 1996 until February 1997, he was head of Public Relations for the President of Russia under Yeltsin.

From 1997 to 1999, he was first deputy chairman of the VGTRK (ВГТРК), which essentially brought state run television under one roof and follows the designs of Vladislav Surkov. It was counter to the Western approach, which would have ended state owned media by promoting a free press that is not state owned and operated.

On 6 June 1999, and largely from Lesin's background among Video International, Novosti, and VGTRK, Prime Minister Sergei Stepashin appointed Lesin to head the Ministry of Press, Broadcasting and Mass Communications of the Russian Federation. After Stepashin's brief tenure, then-Prime Minister Vladimir Putin retained Lesin as minister and allowed him to be a key figure in the 1999 Russian parliamentary elections and the 2000 Russian presidential election. Through Lesin's support, the pro-Kremlin Unity bloc gained power and the incoming Prime Minister Putin succeeded Yeltsin as the Russian president.

Continuing under President Putin from 1999 until 9 March 2004 as Ministry of Press, Broadcasting and Mass Communications of the Russian Federation, Lesin essentially merged a private advertising agency, Video International, which controlled 65–70% of the television advertising market, with the state owned media companies, and thus brought tremendous wealth to Video International.

During Putin's first term as Russian president with Lesin as Minister of the Press, Vladimir Gusinsky's private media holdings, "Media Most", came under intense scrutiny resulting in numerous charges filed against Gusinsky. In an agreement for the charges to be dropped, Gusinsky's immense private media holdings, "Media Most", were to be transferred to Gazprom-Media, which, at the time, had recently acquired NTV, the only nationwide state-independent television in Russia and a highly critical opponent of the War in Chechnya, the Kremlin's handling of the Kursk incident, Vladimir Putin, and the Unity bloc. Gusinsky subsequently was brought under arrest as a fugitive from Russia and while incarcerated refused to agree to the terms for the transfer. However, in 2001 with Lesin acting as mediator, "Media Most" assets were transferred to Gazprom-Media under the terms of Protocol No. 6, which allowed oligarchs to escape prosecution and be given the freedom to leave the country if they turned over their assets to the state.

In the 2002 Telegrand (Russian: Телегранд), the Expert Council of the National Research Center of Television and Radio (Note: Expert Council of the National Research Center of Television and Radio (Russian: экспертного совета Национального исследовательского центра (НИЦ) телевидения и радио (телерадио))) named Lesin as "the most influential person of Russian television and radio".

Under Putin from 6 April 2004 until 18 November 2009, he became adviser to the President of the Russian Federation for mass media relations. During his tenure and beginning in 2005, Lesin helped conceive and create the RT (Russia Today) television news network, he said, "to establish a news channel that would counter CNN and BBC with a Moscow spin. It's been a long time since I was scared by the word propaganda. We need to promote Russia internationally. Otherwise, we'd just look like roaring bears on the prowl."

From 2010 to 2011, Lesin was on the board of directors for National Telecommunications (NTC), (Note: National Telecommunications (NTC) (Russian: Национальных телекоммуникаций (НТК))) which at the time belonged to the National Media Group.

In 2011, he moved to Beverly Hills, California, and enjoyed ocean fishing, being with his family, and helping his son Anton in the Hollywood movie business. Lesin's old friend Alexander Shapiro, a former vice president of Warner Bros., is a co-producer with Anton in several films."HollywoodReporter 2015-11-15" />

In 2013, he returned to Russia and, from 1 October 2013 until 12 January 2015, was head of Gazprom-Media, a state-controlled media giant that describes itself as one of the largest media groups in Russia and Europe. (Note: On 9 December 2013, Vladimir Putin abolished RIA Novosti and merged it with the Voice of Russia to create Rossiya Segodnya.) In April 2014, he became chairman of the Russian Association of Film and Television Producers. He resigned from Gazprom-Media in December 2014, citing family reasons. After retiring, he spent several months in Switzerland for treatments to a spinal injury that he received while skiing and then returned to his home in California.

== Corruption allegations ==
Lesin led the Kremlin's efforts to censor Russia's independent television outlets, according to accusations by US Senator Roger Wicker (R-MS) in 2014. Wicker called on the Justice Department to launch an investigation into Lesin and his immediate family over allegations of corruption and money laundering. In a 29 July 2014 letter to then-Attorney General Eric Holder, Wicker wrote Lesin and his immediate family had "acquired multi-million dollar assets" in Europe and the United States "during his tenure as a civil servant", including multiple residences in Los Angeles worth $28 million."Navalny Letter 2014-07-31" /> On 3 December 2014, Assistant Attorney General Peter J. Kadzik replied to Senator Wicker's letter by stating the Justice Department's Criminal Division and the Federal Bureau of Investigation (FBI) have been referred for appropriate disposition of Lesin and "similarly situated Russian individuals and companies with assets in the United States that may be in violation of the Foreign Corrupt Practices Act and the Anti-Money Laundering Statutes". The properties are:

- $13.8 million house of 1,200 square metres (13,000 sq ft) at 10 Beverly Park, Beverly Hills, California (Note: Purchased in August 2011 by the British Virgin Islands incorporated Dastel Corporation, which Mikhail Lesin is the sole owner.)
- $9 million house of 980 square metres (10,500 sq ft) at 321 Bristol Avenue, Brentwood, Los Angeles, California (Note: Purchased in 2012 by the British Virgin Islands incorporated Dastel Corporation, of which Mikhail Lesin was the sole owner.)
- $5.6 million house of 630 square metres (6,800 sq ft) in Beverly Park, Los Angeles, California (Note: Purchased by HFC Management, of which Mikhail Lesin's daughter, Catherine Lesin, is an employee.)
- $4.3 million house along Mulholland Drive at 13327 Java Drive, Beverly Hills, California (Note: Purchased in 2009 by Java Drive Inc. and where Mikhail Lesin's son, Anton Lessine resided.)
- $3.995 million house of 570 square metres (6,100 sq ft) in Palisades Highlands, Pacific Palisades, Los Angeles, California (Note: Purchased 17 November 2015, by Mikhail Lesin's son, Anton Lessine.)

It's unclear if the FBI ever initiated a probe.

== Death ==
Lesin was found dead before noon on Thursday, 5 November 2015, in The Dupont Circle Hotel in Washington, D.C. He was found without any identification in a hotel room that was in his name. (Note: Almost immediately after Lesin's death, the FBI returned Lesin's passport to his wife Valentina Ivanova who resides in Los Angeles. She confirmed that the passport was Mikhail Yuriyevich Lesin.) The original police report indicated an unknown victim in the room which was booked in his name. On 7 November, a member of the Russian Embassy in Washington, D.C., confirmed the identity of the individual as Mikhail Yuriyevich Lesin. A law enforcement official said there were no obvious signs of forced entry or foul play in his hotel room and that on the video surveillance, Lesin appeared disheveled when he returned to his hotel room.

The Russian news agency TASS reported that an early investigation did not find any signs of violent death, quoting a police spokesman, Sean Hickman, as saying security had not seen anything suspicious. The spokesman said the nature of the investigation could change, depending on what was found at the scene and after an examination of the body. On Friday, 6 November, RIA Novosti reported that Lesin died of a heart attack citing a spokesman for the family as saying: "Today, Mikhail Lesin died ... His death came supposedly from a heart attack." (Note: Several sources immediately reported that Lesin had died of a heart attack. RT reported the next day that the cause of death was a heart attack. In a USA Today article, relatives said he suffered from a disease and died because of the heart attack.) Washington's Metropolitan Police Department opened a "death investigation". Russian officials said they would work with U.S. authorities to determine the circumstances of the death. On 7 November, the Kremlin released official condolences from president Vladimir Putin: "The president appreciates the enormous contribution made by Mikhail Lesin to the formation of modern Russian media." (Note: "Президент высоко ценит огромный вклад, который внес Михаил Лесин в становление современных российских средств массовой информации.")

On 10 March 2016, Mashable stated that they had been informed by Beverly Fields, of the D.C. Office of the Chief Medical Examiner, that Lesin's cause of death was "blunt force injuries to the head", and that Lesin's body showed signs of "blunt force injuries of the neck, torso, upper extremities and lower extremities". During a 10 March press conference, LaShon Beamon, spokesperson for the department of forensic sciences in the medical examiner's office, and Hugh Carew, a spokesman for the police, released an official joint statement that the cause of death was blunt force trauma to the head but the manner of death was still classified as "undetermined".

On 28 October 2016, after a year-long investigation, Washington's chief medical examiner and federal authorities released a joint statement saying Lesin died of blunt-force trauma to his head, sustained in his hotel room induced by falls amid acute ethanol intoxication. The investigation found Lesin had been on a days-long alcohol bender, saying:

"Mr. Lesin entered his hotel room on the morning of Nov. 4 … after days of excessive consumption of alcohol and sustained the injuries that resulted in his death while alone in his hotel room... [he] died as a result of blunt force injuries to his head, with contributing causes being blunt force injuries of the neck, torso, upper extremities, and lower extremities, which were induced by falls amid acute ethanol intoxication."

Lesin was cremated and buried at Hollywood Forever Cemetery. (Note: Sergei Vasilyev, the CEO of Video International, Alexander Akopov of Amedia and Cosmos Film, and Vladimir Grigoriev of Rospechat attended the cremation and viewed the opened casket of Lesin and confirmed that it was Lesin before the cremation ceremony.)

== Murder allegations ==
In July 2017, BuzzFeed reported that multiple intelligence agencies believed Lesin was assassinated. An unnamed FBI agent told BuzzFeed, "What I can tell you is that there isn't a single person inside the bureau who believes this guy got drunk, fell down, and died. Everyone thinks he was whacked and that Putin or the Kremlin were behind it." The weapon was said to be a baseball bat.

In 2018, BuzzFeed published details of a leaked report written for the FBI by Christopher Steele. The secret report, unconfirmed by the FBI, alleges that Lesin was bludgeoned to death by men working for an oligarch close to Putin. The report says the men were ordered to scare but not kill Lesin, but went too far. It says the hit men were Russian state security agents moonlighting for the oligarch and that the death occurred just prior to a scheduled meeting between Lesin and U.S. Justice Department officials to discuss the inner workings of RT. According to BuzzFeed, three other people told a similar story to the FBI, independent of the Steele report.

Lesin's autopsy report was released in 2019 after a protracted 2-year legal battle by RFE/RL which filed a Freedom of Information Act request. Multiple forensic pathologists and medical examiners who saw the released autopsy results raised questions about the official conclusions, and said the evidence suggested possible murder and not a drunken fall. For example, there was a broken neck bone that rarely breaks in falls, but does break commonly during strangulation. Other injuries included soft-tissue hemorrhaging on muscles running along the sides and back of the neck, also similar to what is seen during strangulation.

== Family ==
Lesin was from a Jewish family. He was married to Valentina Ivanova and had a daughter, Catherine, from his first marriage in 1979; and a son, Anton, from his second marriage in 1983. Lesin had five grandchildren at the time of his death. Catherine, aka Yekaterina/Ekaterina Lesina, worked at RT America.

Anton attended a Swiss university and is a producing graduate of the New York Film Academy in Los Angeles. Since 2012, Anton has been a Hollywood film producer, with credits including Rage (originally Tokarev), Haunt, Sabotage, Fading Gigolo, Fury, Rock the Kasbah, The Family Fang, and Dirty Grandpa. With Bill Block's 2015 departure as CEO from QED International and following Paul Hanson's 2015 departure from Megan Ellison's Annapurna Pictures, Anton and Sasha Shapiro operate QED Holdings as its principal financiers through the global media fund, Media Content Capital (MCC), and formed Covert Media in 2014, adding Paul Hanson as CEO in 2015, to make three to four $10 million to $50 million films a year. He is often credited as "Anton Lessine". Anton and Swiss wife, Carole, have two children."Westside Today Nanny 2014-10-20" />

In 2015, Mikhail had a daughter with Victoria Rakhimbayeva (Russian: Виктория Рахимбаева; born 1986), a former Maxim model with whom he had been close since mid-2014.

== Awards and honours ==
- 2006: Order "For Merit to the Fatherland" for "outstanding contribution to the activities of the President of the Russian Federation and many years of honest work".
- 2008: Russian Federation Presidential Certificate of Honour for "outstanding contribution to the activities of the President of the Russian Federation and many years of honest work".

== See also ==
- Gareth Williams
- Alexander Litvinenko
- Alexander Perepilichnyy
- Boris Berezovsky
- Vladimir Pribylovsky
- Alexei Navalny
