= Eugenia Kuzmina =

Russian actress (born 1987)

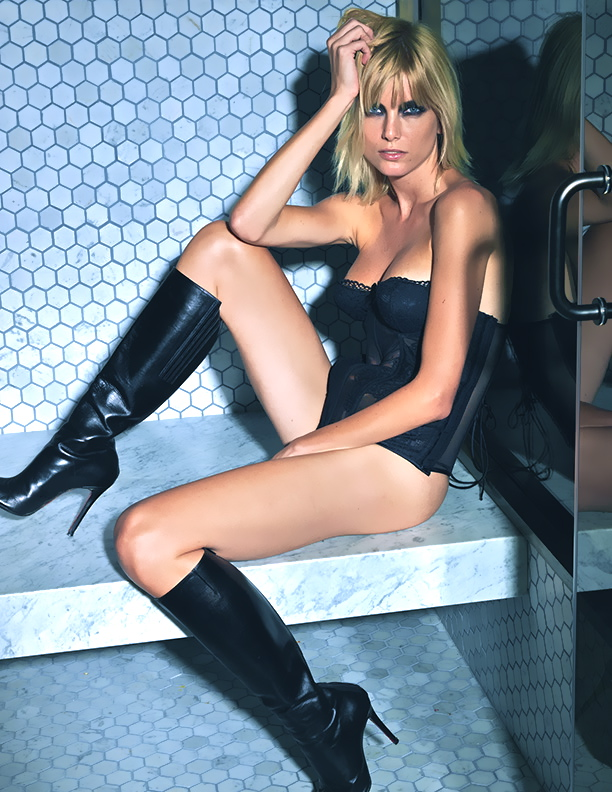
- Kuzmina in 2009
- Born: 25 December 1987 (age 38); Moscow, Soviet Union
- Occupations: Actress; comedian; model
- Spouse: Bill Block
- Children: 2
- Modelling information
- Height: 1.75 m (5 ft 9 in)
- Hair colour: Blonde
- Eye colour: Blue
- Website: http://eugenia-kuzmina.com

Eugenia Kuzmina (Russian: Евге́ния Кузьминá; Yevgeniya Kuzmina; born 25 December 1987) is a Russian actress, comedian and model. Her modeling career took off when she appeared on the cover of Glamour, and walked the runway for multiple designers including Yves Saint Laurent, Alexander McQueen, Thierry Mugler. She appeared in advertisements for Hermes, Armani jeans, Dior sunglasses, GAP, and L'Oreal. Her first video appearance outside of Russia was in a music video "Ange étrange" by David Hallyday. In 2011, Kuzmina transitioned into acting.

== Early life ==
Kuzmina was born in 1987 in Moscow, Soviet Union. Her father was a nuclear physicist. Her mother is a former scientist and a housewife. She was training to be a professional ice skater when at the age of 13 she was discovered by the Russian designer Slava Zaitsev. She starred in national commercials for RC Cola, M&Ms, October chocolate and Russian TV shows like Pole Chudes and Yeralash before being approached by a talent scout from Paris.

== Career ==
Kuzmina's modeling career took off when she started working with Nathalie Models, Ford Models Europe and then with IMG and LA Models.

She was the cover girl for the August 2004 edition of Glamour by Alexei Hey and has been featured in advertisements for Armani Jeans, Dior sunglasses, GAP, Arden B, Express, Kenzi, Replay Jeans, Sephora, and L'Oreal. She has also been featured in magazines, such as Elle, Harper's Bazaar, Marie Claire, Japanese and Russian Vogue, GQ, Self, Shape, As well as catalogs for Hermès and Cartier.

She was featured in a music video for David Hallyday, then Passion Pit, and Demi Lovato and transitioned into film work with a short film, Likeness, directed by Rodrigo Prieto, starring Elle Fanning. Her first TV appearance was in the hit show True Blood. She portrayed a fairy. Right after she was cast in a FOX show New Girl as a model, ABC show Castle as an FBI agent opposite Stana Katic, Netflix show "The Comeback" as a Russian prostitute opposite Lisa Kudrow, Lady Dynamite show with Maria Bamford, etc. Her first starring movie role was in the independent horror film Quarantine L.A. After that, she played opposite John Turturro in a feature film Fading Gigolo, opposite Bill Murray in the film "Rock the Kasbah", was featured in the film Dirty Grandpa opposite Zac Efron, in 2018 film "Justice For All" with Hector Jimenez directed by Hector Echavarria, Bad Moms opposite Mila Kunis and appeared in TV Movie "Tour de Pharmacy" opposite Andy Samberg and Orlando Bloom. In 2019, Kuzmina appeared in Todd Strauss-Schulson's film Isn't It Romantic, alongside Rebel Wilson, and The Gentlemen opposite Michelle Dockery. In 2020, she was seen in TV miniseries Spy City alongside Dominic Cooper She appeared in the 2023 film Assassin, the last Bruce Willis movie, and the new Guy Ritchie film Operation Fortune: Ruse de Guerre.

Kuzmina is passionate about comedy and can frequently be seen doing stand-up at The Comedy Store, Laugh Factory, Improv, Flappers and performing improv at UCB, Groundlings and LA Connection Comedy Theatre. She is currently on tour around the US and the world with her stand up group, The Nobodies. in 2022, Kuzmina created a Stand Up Show," Models of Comedy," which stars a cast of top models doing Comedy

== Personal life ==
Eugenia Kuzmina resides in Los Angeles with her film producer husband Bill Block, who has been CEO of Miramax since April 2017 and two children.

== Filmography ==
=== Film ===
| Year | Title | Role | Notes |
|---|---|---|---|
| 2013 | Quarantine L.A. | Arlene Balric | |
| 2013 | Likeness | Asylum Beauty | Short |
| 2013 | In the Cage | The Beverages #2 | |
| 2013 | Game Changer | Nala | Short |
| 2013 | Fading Gigolo | Lady on Street | |
| 2013 | The Wonder Girls | Stasi Official | Short |
| 2014 | Andy Cohen Young Actor in Hollywood | Russian Model | Short |
| 2014 | That Awkward Moment | Girl at the Bar | |
| 2014 | Lost Angels | Lara Volkov | |
| 2014 | Fury | Hilda Meier | |
| 2014 | Mentor | Connie | Short |
| 2015 | The Great Escape | Zhanna | Short |
| 2015 | The Family Fang | - | |
| 2015 | Rock the Kasbah | Gulla | |
| 2016 | Dirty Grandpa | Hippie Cathy | |
| 2016 | Too Fast, Los Angeles | Jessica | |
| 2016 | Bad Moms | Alina | |
| 2016 | The Receptionist | Ksenia | Short |
| 2017 | Tour de Pharmacy | Finnish Wife | TV movie |
| 2017 | First House on the Hill | Alice | |
| 2018 | Baudot Code | Alana Rodchenka | Short |
| 2018 | Justice for All | Luna | |
| 2018 | Retake | Darlene | Short |
| 2018 | Assisted Living | Dr. Claire Richards | Short |
| 2019 | Asking for a Friend | Jessica | Short |
| 2019 | Nobodies Funny Tour | Comedian | Short |
| 2019 | Where We Go from Here | Colette | |
| 2019 | The Gentlemen | Misha | |
| 2019 | 12 Pups of Christmas | Raphael & Paul's Mom | |
| 2020 | Ex First Lady | Melania Trump | Short |
| 2021 | Trick | Kimchi | |
| 2021 | The Elevator | Nicole | |
| 2022 | Green Kola | Herself | Short |
| 2022 | Stars and Scars in the Metaverse | - | |
| 2023 | Operation Fortune: Ruse de Guerre | Marcia | |
| 2023 | Neon Bleed | Irina Volkova | |
| 2023 | Assassin | Trainer | |
| 2023 | Ape vs Mecha Ape | Zara | |
| 2023 | Strange Darling | Beth | |
| 2024 | Mundije | Albana Arifi | |
| 2024 | The Private Eye | Olga | |
| 2024 | Team of Two | Angel | |
| 2024 | The Film Festival | Fran Walsh | |

=== Television ===
| Year | Title | Role | Notes |
|---|---|---|---|
| 2011 | Blue Bloods | Denise Salter | Episode: "Moonlighting" |
| 2012 | White Collar | Jane | Episode: "Pulling Strings" |
| 2012 | True Blood | Faerie | Episode: "In the Beginning" |
| 2013 | New Girl | Svetlana | Episode: "Bachelorette Party" |
| 2013 | Castle | Blonde | Episode: "Valkyrie" |
| 2014 | First Jobs | Bar Customer | Episode: "Don't Succumb to the Dumb" |
| 2014 | The Comeback | Russian | Episode: "Valerie Tries to Get Yesterday Back" |
| 2015 | Lindsay | Eugenia | Episode: "Lindsay and Her Friends Talk About Men" |
| 2016 | Lady Dynamite | White Woman | Episode: "Bisexual Because of Meth" |
| 2017 | Brian Remus: Science Genius | Model | Episode: "A Most Unwanted Man" |
| 2020 | Comedy Parlour Live: Quarantine Edition | Herself | Episode: "Chico Will, Eugenia Kuzmina and Justin Lawson" |
| 2020 | Spy City | Friedericke Stahl | Recurring Cast |
| 2022 | I Can See Your Voice | Runway Model | Episode: "Episode #2.6" |
