= Adrian Voo =

Malaysian film actor (born 1986)

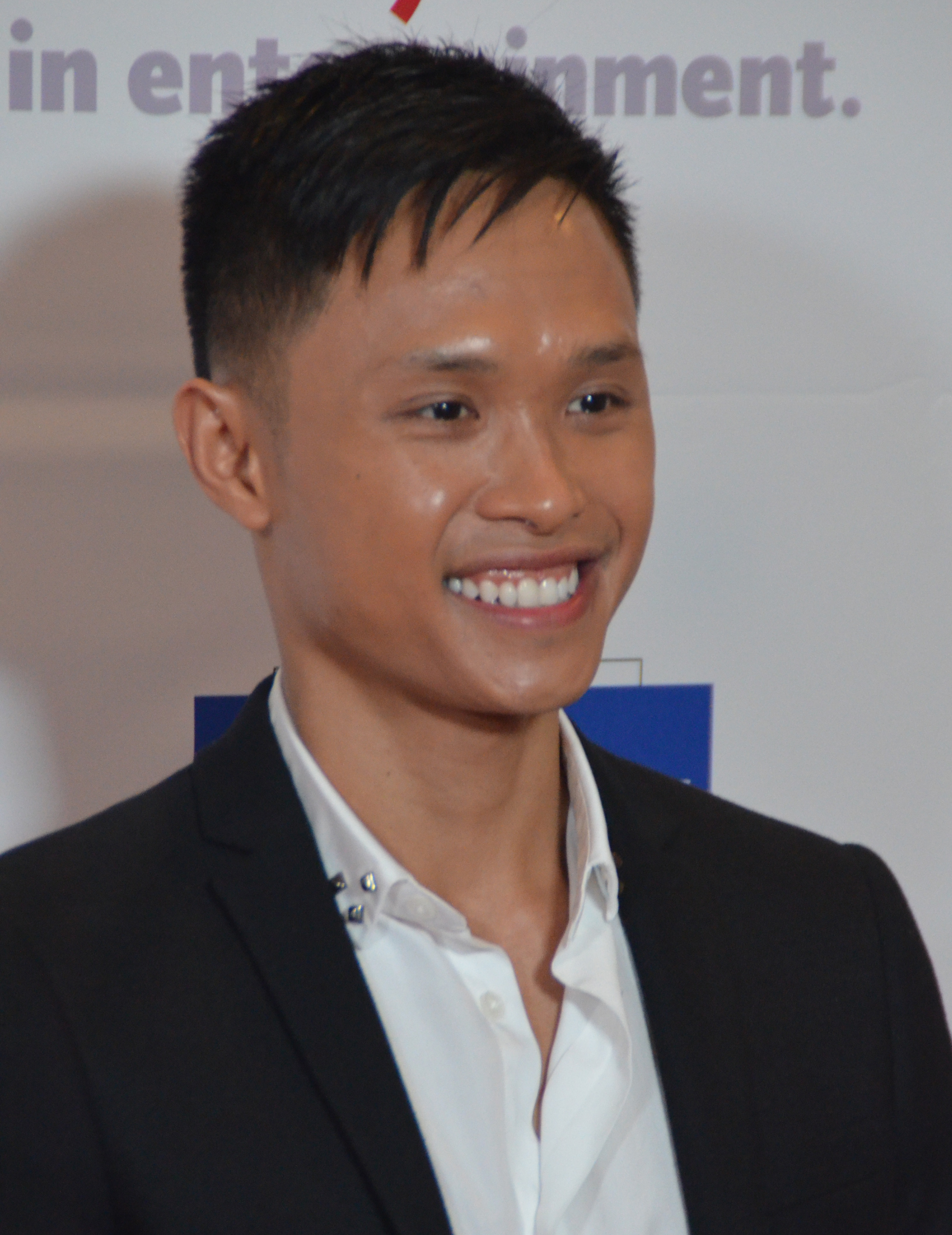
- Voo in June 2016
- Born: April 30, 1986 (age 40); Kuala Lumpur, Malaysia
- Education: San Francisco State University (B.Sc.); New York Film Academy
- Occupation: Actor
- Years active: 2012–present

Adrian Voo (/vuː/; born April 30, 1986) is a Malaysian film actor. He came to prominence with supporting roles in the comedy films Amateur Night and Dear Dictator.

== Life and career ==
Adrian Voo was born in Kuala Lumpur, Malaysia. He earned a B.Sc. in Business Management from San Francisco State University. He then attended the New York Film Academy for acting.

In 2013, Voo made his film debut in the indie psychological thriller Seventy-Nine. That same year, he was cast in The Hangover Part III but the scene was ultimately cut from the final film. He also portrayed a zombie apocalypse survivor in the sci-fi straight-to-DVD thriller Quarantine L.A.

In 2014, Voo was cast alongside Jason Biggs, Ashley Tisdale and Janet Montgomery in the adult comedy Amateur Night. The following year, he was cast alongside Jennette McCurdy and Virginia Gardner in the coming-of-age comedy Little Bitches.

In 2017, he appeared in the satire comedy Dear Dictator, for which he also served as an executive producer. The film starred Michael Caine and Katie Holmes.

== Filmography ==
=== Film and television ===
Year	Title	Role	Notes
2013	The Hangover Part III	Prisoner	Uncredited
2013	Seventy-Nine	Isamu Tan	
2013	Quarantine L.A.	Quentin Mayers	
2013	House of Lies	Galweather & Stearn Employee	Episode: “Family Values”
2014	Dub Step	Tim	Short film
2014	BlackJacks	Lee	Unaired television pilot
2015	Boiling Pot	College Student	
2016	Amateur Night	Best Man Dan	
2018	Little Bitches	Adrian	
2018	Dear Dictator	Neighbor	Also executive producer
2018	Venom	Additional Voices	
2019	Kill in the Blank	Isaac	Episode: “Margin of Error”

=== Music videos ===
Year	Title	Artist(s)	Notes
2014	“No Matter Where You Are”	Us the Duo	Republic Records
