= QED International =

American film production studio, financer and international distributor

- Logo used since 2002
- Type: Private
- Industry: Motion pictures; Business media; Publishing
- Founded: 2002; 24 years ago
- Founder: Bill Block, Elliot Ferwerda, Paul Hanson
- Headquarters: Los Angeles, California, United States
- Area served: Worldwide
- Key people: Sasha Shapiro (CEO); Anton Lessine
- Products: Filmmaking; Film Production
- Services: Financing
- Parent: Media Content Capital (2012 - present)
- Website: qedinternational.com

QED International is an American independent film production studio, financier and international distributor based in Los Angeles. It is best known for financing and producing District 9, Fury, and Dirty Grandpa.

== History ==
Bill Block formed QED International in 2002 as CEO. According to Variety, the company was founded in 2006 by Bill Block, Elliot Ferwerda and Paul Hanson. The company is Los Angeles-based. Previously Bill Block was president at Lionsgate predecessor, Artisan Entertainment and overseer of West Coast operations for ICM. Paul Hanson was Chief Operating Officer in the time of the founding who was charge of film financing, production, and distribution. In 2006 John Friedberg joined as Vice President of International sales. Under the executive management's oversight, the team at QED International from its founding as an indie film player to a slate partner in the 2010s decade, produced acclaimed films for the motion pictures industry including Neill Blomkamp's District 9, Oliver Stone's W. and John Turturro's Fading Gigolo.

One of the acclaimed QED International films was District 9 that released in 2009. The film company discerned potential of an unpublished 2006 graphic novel, Weta Workshop used as their film treatment for a science fiction film. The company became the producer of the film. At the 2007 AFM a record middle-eight figure deal was signed between Sony Pictures and QED International for the Peter Jackson film's distribution in all English-language territories (including North America), Russia, Italy, Korea and Portugal. The film was the directorial debut of Neill Blomkamp who co-wrote the script originally planned to be a Halo film with Terri Tatchell. The film was highly anticipated for its live-action plot. Shooting commenced in the spring 2007 in South Africa. The film had a modest budget of $30 million. However the film was received with critical and commercial success with an opening of $37 million in USA on 14 August 2009 and total box office amounting to $211 million worldwide. QED has also co-produced with Mann's Forward Pass company for 2011 film Texas Killing Fields.

In May 2012, Media Content Capital, an Anton Lessine and Sasha Shapiro global media fund, gained a controlling interest in QED through QED Holdings with an eight figure investment. QED International majority stake was now held by Media Content Capital (MCC). The organization is a private equity fund in charge of finance. Lessine and Shapiro are MCC's principal financiers. The financial investment was concluded at the Cannes Film Festival with MCC representatives noting the risk mitigation approach from QED was one of the primary reasons for the investment plan. The arrangement would allow QED to produce and finance four to seven features annually.

One of the primary collaborators with QED International was actor Arnold Schwarzenegger. The actor chose the QED-financed 2011 film Cry Macho as one of the stages for his grand debut and return to Hollywood. The actor would resume acting after years in a political career in California. The actor noted the Cry Macho's emphasis on character development would contrast well with the continuation of the Terminator package. In 2012, Schwarzenegger joined Josh Holloway's Ten featuring a high action script. The film loosely based on an Agatha Christie story renamed to Sabotage and released on March 28, 2014. In 2013 QED International negotiated with Brad Pitt for David Ayer's WWII film Fury. Columbia Pictures acquired the global rights to the film. The film released on October 17, 2014, to commercial success.

On February 24, 2015, Deadline confirmed that CEO Bill Block had officially left the post from the company to join a new company Merced Media. Merced Media, a wide release production company also was invested in co-production for two films with QED after the departure. International sales executive John Friedberg also stepped down from the managing board during this time. Friedberg was hired by STX Entertainment. The executive was noted for bringing equity and international distribution strategies for QED International's prior blockbuster films. In the same year, Paul Hanson also moved from COO of QED to the founder of and CEO of Covert Media. The new independent feature production, financing and distribution company based in Los Angeles also served

== Filmography ==
=== Financier/Producer ===
- The Hunting Party (2007)
- The Mysteries of Pittsburgh (2008)
- Smart People (2008)
- The Lucky Ones (2008)
- The Echo (2008)
- W. (2008)
- A Perfect Getaway (2009)
- District 9 (2009)
- Texas Killing Fields (2011)
- Alex Cross (2012)
- Elysium (2013) - also financier
- Haunt (2013)
- Sabotage (2014) - also financier
- Breathe In (2014)
- Fury (2014) - also financier
- Time Out of Mind (2014) - also financier
- Rock the Kasbah (2015) - also financier
- The Family Fang (2015) - also financier
- Dirty Grandpa (2016)
- Secret Magic Control Agency (2021)
- Fairyland (2025)

=== International distributor ===
- Smart People (2008)
- The Echo (2008)
- District 9 (2009) (France, Scandinavia, Eastern Europe, the Middle East, Israel, Turkey and Asia excluding Hong Kong and South Korea only)
- New York, I Love You (2009)
- Soul Surfer (2011) (Europe, the CIS and Japan only)
- Texas Killing Fields (2011)
- The Kings of Summer (2013)
- Fading Gigolo (2013)
- That Awkward Moment (2014)
- Sabotage (2014)
- Fury (2014) (Italy, Eastern Europe, the Baltics, the Middle East, Turkey, Africa and Asia excluding South Korea only)
