= Little Bitches =

2018 American comedy film

- Official release poster
- Directed by: Nick Kreiss
- Written by: Nick Kreiss
- Produced by: Scott Aversano; Will Russell-Shapiro; Jorge Garcia-Castro; Diego del Río Toca; Dan Carillo Levy; Eugenio Villamar; Dom Genest
- Starring: Kiersey Clemons; Virginia Gardner; Jennette McCurdy
- Cinematography: Andre Lascaris
- Edited by: Garret Price
- Music by: Heather McIntosh
- Production companies: Aversano Films; Defining Entertainment; Moxie 88
- Distributed by: Sony Pictures Home Entertainment
- Release date: January 23, 2018 (United States)
- Running time: 86 minutes
- Country: United States
- Language: English

Little Bitches is a 2018 American coming-of-age comedy film written and directed by Nick Kreiss. It stars Kiersey Clemons, Virginia Gardner, and Jennette McCurdy.

It was released through video on demand on January 23, 2018, by Sony Pictures Home Entertainment.

== Plot ==
In a prologue, high school freshmen Annie, Marisa, and Kelly vow to open their college acceptance letters together at their senior bash.

Years later, Annie and Marisa are still best friends, but Kelly has stopped talking to both of them and is now the most popular girl in school. Annie is determined to keep the friends promise and open the letters at the senior party, but Marisa is annoyed by Annie constantly talking about the pact. Meanwhile, Kelly attempts to talk to Annie and Marisa, but the other popular girls bully them and ruin her attempt at conversation.

In class, Annie sees Kelly and the other popular girls laughing about something, causing her to have a panic attack and run to the bathroom. Marisa goes to comfort her, but Kelly follows them and pushes her outside, where they get caught by the annoying hall monitor, Andy, who gives them both detention. Marisa and Annie decide to skip class for the rest of the day and go on adventures while trying to discover the location of the senior party.

At detention, Kelly sends Marisa a text message. Marisa deletes it, upsetting Annie. After detention is over Annie confronts Marisa, who loses her cool and yells at Annie to stop "living in a fantasy world" and give up on her hope of rekindling their friendship with Kelly; Annie breaks down in tears. Annie, Marisa, and Kelly all separately reminisce about how much closer they all were during their freshman year.

Annie sees Kelly and her popular friends getting into a limo to go to the senior party; she gets depressed and eats an entire bag of potato chips. Marisa finds Annie moping by her car, and admits that the text message Kelly sent her in detention said that Kelly missed them. Marisa didn't tell Annie because she is afraid that if Kelly and Annie became friends again, Annie would abandon her. Annie accuses Marisa of running away from her problems and not doing anything with her life. Marisa then leaves to try to buy alcohol. At the liquor store, Marisa finds one of the mean girls from freshman year, Sarah, working her second job while pregnant. Sarah tells Marisa that life gets "real" after high school, and that she should just accept it as it comes. Night falls, and Marisa gets drunk and walks around the closed school.

Kelly arrives to the senior party but seems unenthusiastic about it. Kelly finds Marisa and tells her she never wanted to end their friendship; it was Marisa who changed.

Annie decides to stop worrying and go to the party. She picks up her crush, Phil, and they figure out where the party is by calling liquor stores in town to find out which one delivered the booze to the party and get the address. As they drive, they speed past the police. Annie panics and slams the gas, turning things into a police chase. They end up crashing the car right into the party. The three girls finally make up and hug.

After the party, Annie, Marisa, and Kelly finally honor the promise they made four years ago and open the letters together. The film ends before it is revealed what each letter says.

== Cast ==
- Kiersey Clemons as Marisa
- Virginia Gardner as Kelly
- Jennette McCurdy as Annie
- Moisés Arias as Phil
- Andrew Santino as Trent
- Adam Lustick as Johnny
- Kate Berlant as College Counselor Liz
- Zachary Knighton as Mr. Warner
- Brianne Howey as Sarah Richter
- Karan Soni as Hall Monitor Andy
- Beth Dover as Kelly's Mom
- Laura Hayes as Marisa's Grandma
- Chloe Bridges as Brooke
- Irene Choi as Tiffany
- Adrian Voo as Adrian
- Khary Payton as Marisa's Dad
- Jaime Camil as Mr. Villanueva

== Production ==
In December 2015, it was announced Jennette McCurdy, Kiersey Clemons and Virginia Gardner would lead the ensemble cast in the film, with Nick Kreiss making his directorial debut from his own original screenplay. Scott Aversano will serve as producer on the film, alongside Will Russell-Shapiro, Jorge Garcia, Diego Del Rio, Dom Genest, Dan Carrillo-Levy and Eugenio Villamar under their Aversano Films, Defining Entertainment and Moxie 88 banners respectively.

== Release ==
The film was released through video on demand on January 23, 2018, by Sony Pictures Home Entertainment.
