= Operation Fortune: Ruse de Guerre =

2023 film by Guy Ritchie

- Theatrical release poster
- Directed by: Guy Ritchie
- Written by: Ivan Atkinson; Marn Davies; Guy Ritchie
- Produced by: Guy Ritchie; Ivan Atkinson; Jason Statham; Bill Block
- Starring: Jason Statham; Aubrey Plaza; Josh Hartnett; Cary Elwes; Bugzy Malone; Hugh Grant
- Cinematography: Alan Stewart
- Edited by: James Herbert
- Music by: Christopher Benstead
- Production companies: Miramax; STXfilms; Toff Guy
- Distributed by: Lionsgate (United States); Amazon Prime Video (United Kingdom); STXinternational (International)
- Release dates: January 4, 2023 (International); March 3, 2023 (United States); April 7, 2023 (United Kingdom)
- Running time: 114 minutes
- Countries: United States; United Kingdom
- Language: English
- Budget: $50 million
- Box office: $49 million

Operation Fortune: Ruse de Guerre is a 2023 spy action comedy film directed by Guy Ritchie, and written by Ritchie, Ivan Atkinson, and Marn Davies. The film stars Jason Statham, Aubrey Plaza, Josh Hartnett, Cary Elwes, Bugzy Malone and Hugh Grant. The film is about a spy, Orson Fortune (Statham), who must retrieve a stolen high-tech device before an arms dealer (Grant) can sell it to the highest bidder.

Operation Fortune: Ruse de Guerre was theatrically released in international territories on January 4, 2023, and theatrically released in the United States on March 3. It was released digitally on Amazon Prime Video in the United Kingdom on April 7.

== Plot ==
A gang of Ukrainian mobsters manages to steal a device known as "The Handle", estimated to be worth billions, from a secret military black site in Kyiv. In response, the British government hires Nathan Jasmine to retrieve the Handle before billionaire arms dealer Greg Simmonds can sell it to the highest bidder. Nathan hires a team consisting of MI6 super-spy Orson Fortune, American Central Intelligence Agency computer programmer and hacker, Sarah Fidel, and special forces operator and marksman, J.J. Davies. The team travels to Madrid, seeking the courier tasked with transporting the hard drive containing the data from the Handle. Their search is interrupted by Mike, a rival of Nathan's, who seems to have also been hired to retrieve the Handle. Sarah manages to copy the hard drive's contents first. Learning that Simmonds plans to host a charity gala in Cannes, the team decides to infiltrate it by blackmailing his favorite movie star, Danny Francesco, into helping them distract Simmonds. Sarah will be accompanying Danny as "Michaela" while Orson plays as Danny's manager. Sarah gets through the phone to discover secret talks about the buyer for the Handle.

Simmonds invites Danny and Sarah to spend some time in his Turkish villa in Antalya. Orson infiltrates the Ukrainian mafia house to aid Sarah in hacking their computers, disguising it as a robbery. The team and Nathan learn the Handle is an advanced AI developed by the British government that is capable of being programmed to defeat any security system in the world.

Upon learning that the exchange for the Handle will take place in Antalya, the team travels to Turkey. While Simmonds shows Danny his memorabilia, Orson and JJ work to track down one of Simmonds' moles within the Turkish government. Disguised as Simmonds' lawyer, who died due to Orson, Orson attends the exchange and finalizes it, but Mike and his men intervene, resulting in the death of almost everyone present and the theft of the Handle. This incident makes it clear that Mike has gone rogue and is working independently. Despite the problems the team has caused him, Simmonds is willing to help because Mike's theft of the Handle has cost Simmonds his commission.

Simmonds tells them that the buyers were two bio-tech moguls, Trent and Arnold, who have been hoarding gold and intend to use the Handle to cause a worldwide financial collapse. While Orson and JJ clear heavy security on ground level, Simmonds and Danny go up into the tower where Mike is finalizing the deal for the Handle with the tech moguls. Simmonds shows them how he could easily take out their loved ones if he is not paid for the weapon. He and Danny manage to leave before everyone turns on one another. As Orson arrives, the only one left is Mike, so Orson kills him and retrieves the Handle. In Doha, the team is offered another job, but they decide to go on vacation. Orson tells them he has used the proceeds from the robbery at the Ukrainians' villa to finance Danny's new film, about the film's events, with Danny playing Simmonds and Simmonds acting as an on-set producer.

== Cast ==
- Jason Statham as Orson Fortune
- Aubrey Plaza as Sarah Fidel
- Cary Elwes as Nathan
- Hugh Grant as Greg Simmonds
- Josh Hartnett as Danny Francesco
- Bugzy Malone as J.J.
- Eddie Marsan as Knighton
- Peter Ferdinando as Mike
- Lourdes Faberes as Emilia
- Max Beesley as Ben Harris
- Eugenia Kuzmina as Marcia
- Bestemsu Özdemir as Vivienne
- Kaan Urgancıoğlu as Casa
- Sam Douglas as Saul
- Tom Rosenthal as Trent

== Production ==
The screenplay was written by Ivan Atkinson, Marn Davies, and Ritchie. Produced by Miramax, the project was originally to be distributed by STX Entertainment. In December 2020, Aubrey Plaza joined the cast. In January 2021, the cast was rounded out with Cary Elwes, Bugzy Malone and Josh Hartnett in supporting roles. In February 2021, Hugh Grant joined the cast.

Principal photography commenced on January 14, 2021, with filming taking place in Antalya, Turkey, Farnborough and Qatar. Previously known as Five Eyes (in reference to the intelligence alliance), the film was officially renamed Operation Fortune: Ruse de Guerre in September 2021.

== Release ==
=== Theatrical ===
Operation Fortune: Ruse de Guerre was scheduled to be released by STX Entertainment. It was originally scheduled for release on January 21, 2022, and March 18, 2022. On February 18, 2022, the film was pulled from the release schedule without comment by the studio. Reports indicate the film was pulled from release, not due to the COVID-19 pandemic as before, but because it featured gangsters of Ukrainian nationality as the main antagonist Greg Simmonds' henchmen. The film's producers thought it would be of bad taste, in light of the ongoing Russo-Ukrainian War sparking global outrage, for the film to present "Ukrainian baddies". In November 2022, amid STX's restructuring, it was reported that the film would likely be released domestically through a streaming service, while its international distributors would still proceed with releasing the film theatrically, which began on January 4, 2023. On February 13, 2023, Lionsgate was revealed to have bought the U.S. distribution rights and announced the film would be released theatrically on March 3, 2023.

=== Home media ===
Lionsgate Home Entertainment released Operation Fortune: Ruse de Guerre for digital download on March 21, 2023. The film was released in the United Kingdom via Amazon's Prime Video streaming service on April 7, 2023.

The film was released for Blu-ray, DVD, and 4K UHD on May 16, 2023.

== Reception ==
=== Box office ===
Operation Fortune: Ruse de Guerre grossed $6.5 million in the United States and Canada, and $42.5 million in other territories, for a worldwide total of $49 million.

In United States, the film was released alongside Creed III and Demon Slayer: Kimetsu no Yaiba – To the Swordsmith Village, was projected to gross $3–6 million from 2,168 theaters in its opening weekend. The film made $1 million on its first day, including $220,000 from Thursday night previews. It went on to debut to $3.1 million, finishing in seventh.

=== Critical response ===
On Rotten Tomatoes, the film has an approval rating of 51% based on 151 reviews, with an average rating of 5.6/10. The site's critical consensus reads, "Operation Fortune can't keep up with the best modern action movies, but it's got just enough firepower for viewers seeking a few undemanding thrills." On Metacritic, the film has a weighted average score of 51 out of 100, based on 35 critics, indicating "mixed or average reviews". Audiences polled by CinemaScore gave the film an average grade of "B+" on an A+ to F scale.

John Li of Geek Culture gave it a rating of 7.4 out of 10, and praised the plot and Statham's character, stating: "Fortune is probably not the most realistic character we’ve seen on the big screen (we don’t watch spy movies to believe their super abilities are existent in real life anyway), but you can bet he is oozing with charisma." Pat Brown of Slant Magazine gave it 1 out of 4 and wrote: "Promising but failing to deliver the colorful characters and winding, breakneck plot of a caper, Operation Fortune may itself be a ruse, but it’s not a convincing one."
