= Bill Block =

American film producer (born 1954)

- Born: William Hunt Block; April 2, 1954 (age 72); New York City, U.S.
- Education: Columbia University
- Occupation: Film producer
- Spouse: Eugenia Kuzmina

William Hunt Block (born April 2, 1954) is an American film producer who was CEO of Miramax from April 2017 to October 2023. His producing credits include W. (2008), District 9 (2009), Fury (2014), Bad Moms (2016), Dirty Grandpa (2016), Halloween (2018), and Halloween Kills (2021).

== Early life ==
Block was born in New York City and is the son of Huntington T. Block, an insurance underwriter, and the brother of the actor Hunt Block. He attended Columbia University and later became a supporter of the school's film studies program.

== Career ==
Block began his career as a literary agent before founding the Intertalent Agency in 1988, where he represented artists such as Kim Basinger, Samuel L. Jackson, Steven Seagal, Charlie Sheen, John Travolta, Forest Whitaker, Sam Raimi, Roland Emmerich and William Friedkin. In 1992, he joined International Creative Management as head of West Coast Operations.

Block founded Artisan Entertainment, an independent film studio that produced films including The Blair Witch Project; The Buena Vista Social Club; Darren Aronofsky's Pi and Requiem for a Dream; The Limey directed by Steven Soderbergh; The Ninth Gate starring Johnny Depp and directed by Roman Polanski; and David Koepp's Stir of Echoes and Made starring Jon Favreau and Vince Vaughn.

In 2002, Block founded film finance, production and sales company QED International. He was CEO of QED for 12 years, producing films including Neill Blomkamp's District 9 and Elysium, Oliver Stone's W., and David Ayer's WWII thriller Fury starring Brad Pitt. In 2014, after Media Content Capital took a controlling interest in QED, Block left the company to launch Merced Media with producer Kevin Frakes.

From 2015–17, he was managing director of Bill Block Media, producing the commercially successful Bad Moms starring Mila Kunis and Kristen Bell, and Dirty Grandpa starring Robert De Niro and Zac Efron. In November 2015, he settled a legal dispute with QED after his former company filed a federal lawsuit alleging trademark infringement and unfair competition concerning the rights to Dirty Grandpa.

He was named CEO of Miramax in April 2017. He left the studio in October 2023 following the lapse of his contract with them, forming another production company, BlockFilm, later that month. Producer Jonathan Glickman subsequently replaced Block as CEO of Miramax on April 2, 2024.

== Personal life ==
Block lives in the Hollywood Hills with his wife, Eugenia Kuzmina, a model, actress, and comedian, his two sons, and a daughter.

== Filmography ==
He was a producer in all films unless otherwise noted.

=== Film ===
| Year | Film | Credit | Notes | Ref. |
|---|---|---|---|---|
| 2001 | Vanilla Sky | Executive producer | | |
| 2003 | Devil's Pond | Executive producer | Direct-to-video | |
| 2007 | First Born | Executive producer | | |
| 2007 | The Lucky Ones | Executive producer | | |
| 2007 | The Hunting Party | | | |
| 2008 | Smart People | Executive producer | | |
| 2008 | W. | | | |
| 2009 | Powder Blue | Executive producer | | |
| 2009 | District 9 | Executive producer | | |
| 2011 | Texas Killing Fields | Executive producer | | |
| 2012 | Alex Cross | | | |
| 2013 | Elysium | | | |
| 2013 | Fading Gigolo | | | |
| 2013 | Haunt | | | |
| 2014 | Sabotage | | | |
| 2014 | Fury | | | |
| 2015 | The Family Fang | Executive producer | | |
| 2015 | Rock the Kasbah | | | |
| 2016 | Dirty Grandpa | | | |
| 2016 | Bad Moms | | | |
| 2017 | A Bad Moms Christmas | Executive producer | | |
| 2018 | Halloween | | | |
| 2018 | The Perfection | | | |
| 2019 | Jay and Silent Bob Reboot | Executive producer | | |
| 2019 | The Gentlemen | | | |
| 2020 | Uncle Frank | | | |
| 2021 | Wrath of Man | | | |
| 2021 | He's All That | | | |
| 2021 | Halloween Kills | | | |
| 2021 | Mother/Android | | | |
| 2022 | Sick | | | |
| 2022 | Confess, Fletch | | | |
| 2022 | Halloween Ends | | | |
| 2023 | Operation Fortune: Ruse de Guerre | | | |
| 2023 | Gray Matter | Executive producer | | |
| 2023 | The Holdovers | | | |
| 2023 | Strange Darling | | | |
| 2023 | Old Dads | | | |
| 2024 | The Beekeeper | | | |
| 2024 | The Exorcism | | | |
| 2024 | Here | | | |
| 2025 | Inheritance | | | |
| 2025 | A Working Man | | | |
| 2025 | The Home | | | |
| TBA | Harvest Moon | | | |
| TBA | World War 3 | | | |

Production manager

| Year | Film | Role | Notes |
|---|---|---|---|
| 1998 | Belly | Executive in charge of production | |
| 1999 | Stir of Echoes | Executive in charge of production | |
| 2000 | The Way of the Gun | Executive in charge of production | |
| 2001 | The Center of the World | Executive in charge of production | |
| 2001 | Made | Executive in charge of production | Uncredited |

Thanks

| Year | Film | Role |
|---|---|---|
| 1997 | Spawn | Thanks |

=== Television ===
| Year | Title | Credit | Notes |
|---|---|---|---|
| 2015 | Good at Life | Executive producer | Television film |
| 2020 | Spy City | Executive producer | |
| 2023 | Project Greenlight: A New Generation | Executive producer | Documentary |
| TBA | Serendipity | Executive producer | |
| TBA | The Gentlemen | Executive producer | |
