= Jenny Mollen =

American actress (born 1979)

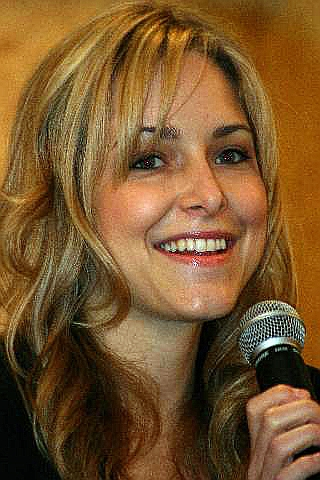
- Mollen in 2005
- Born: Jenny Ann Mollen; May 30, 1979 (age 47); Phoenix, Arizona, U.S.
- Other names: Jenny Mollen Biggs; Jenny Biggs
- Education: University of California, Los Angeles (BA)
- Occupations: Actress; writer
- Years active: 2000–present
- Spouse: Jason Biggs (m. 2008; sep. 2026)
- Children: 2

Jenny Ann Biggs (née Mollen; born May 30, 1979) is an American actress and writer. She played Nina Ash on the television series Angel (2003–04). She appeared on the series Viva Laughlin (2007), Crash (2008), and Girls (2014). Mollen has published two collections of essays, and has written articles for various publications, including Cosmopolitan and Parents. She has appeared on the New York Times Best Seller list twice with her books I Like You Just The Way I Am (2014) and Live Fast Die Hot (2016).

== Early life ==
Mollen was born in Phoenix, Arizona. Mollen's father is Jewish and her mother is Christian; she was raised culturally Jewish. She has a sister and a half-brother. In the late 1990s, Mollen graduated from Chaparral High School in Scottsdale, Arizona. She studied theater and graduated from UCLA School of Theater, Film and Television. Mollen briefly attended graduate school to study psychology.

Mollen worked in local theater as a child. She worked at Old Globe Theatre in San Diego, California, the Idyllwild Arts Academy, and the Oregon Shakespeare Festival in Ashland, Oregon.

== Career ==
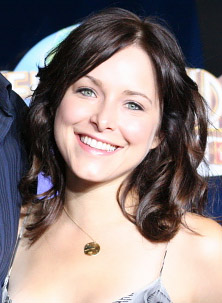
Mollen in 2005

In 2005, Mollen announced in an interview about her plans to perform in London in a play she wrote about her dog.

In 2009, Mollen wrote the short film Kidnapping Caitlynn, starring Jason Biggs, Julie Benz, and herself. The film was directed by Katherine Cunningham Eves.

In 2016, Mollen co-starred with her husband Jason Biggs as fictional husband and wife characters in comedy film Amateur Night.

In 2012 and 2013, Mollen wrote a humor column for The Smoking Jacket, a website affiliated with Playboy, as well as an advice column for Playboy.

In January 2013, Mollen signed with St. Martin's Press to write a book of comedic essays, I Like You Just the Way I Am. The book reached #10 on The New York Times Best Seller list for Print & E-Book Nonfiction on its debut in June 2014. On August 4, 2016, it was announced that ABC Digital acquired a single-camera comedy written by and starring Mollen based on her NYT Best Seller I Like You Just The Way I Am.

In June 2016, Mollen published a follow-up, Live Fast Die Hot, which also subsequently became New York Times Best Seller at #8 in Humor. In August 2016, it was reported that the film rights had been acquired by Warner Bros. with Anne Hathaway attached to star and Mollen attached to write and executive produce.

== Personal life ==
Mollen met actor Jason Biggs while filming My Best Friend's Girl and they were engaged by January 2008. On April 23, 2008, the couple eloped and got married in Los Angeles. In July 2008, they had a formal wedding ceremony in Napa Valley. Their son, Sid, was born on February 15, 2014. Their second son, Lazlo, was born on October 2, 2017. After living in Los Angeles for many years, the Biggs family moved to New York City in 2018. In May 2026, it was reported Mollen and Biggs have separated after 18 years of marriage.

Mollen speaks German fluently.

After the October 7 attacks, 2023, Mollen signed an open letter by Creative Community for Peace calling for the world to "stand with Israel as it defends itself against a terrorist regime in Gaza that seeks Israel’s destruction." Mollen, alongside her husband Biggs, also signed the "No Hostage Left Behind Letter", demanding the release of all hostages kidnapped by Hamas during the attack. In November 2023, Mollen spoke at a Friends of the Israeli Defense Forces fundraiser that doubled as a Shabbat dinner in Atlanta.

== Filmography ==
=== Film ===
Year	Title	Role	Notes
2002	Influence	Jessica the Influencer	Short film
2003	Searching for Haizmann	Grace Robin	
2003	What Was That?	The Damsel	Video short
2003	Billy Makes the Cut	Ashley	Short film
2004	D.E.B.S.	German Deb	
2004	The Raven	Lenna	Short film
2005	Fear Itself	Wendy	
2006	Ring Around the Rosie	Wendy Baldwin	Video
2006	Cattle Call	Marina Dell	
2008	My Best Friend's Girl	Colleen, the new girl	
2008	An Inconvenient Penguin	Dr. Gootentag	Video short
2008	Off the Ledge	Amber-Elizabeth	
2009	Kidnapping Caitlynn	Emily; screenplay	Short film
2011	L!fe Happens	Rita the Receptionist	
2011	Crazy, Stupid, Love	Lisa	
2012	Extracted	Abbey	
2016	Amateur Night	Anne Carter	
2026	Influenced		

=== Television ===
Year	Title	Role	Notes
2000	18 Wheels of Justice	Susan Curran	Episode: "Mr. Invisible"
2001	Strong Medicine	Blonde	Episode: "Black 'n' Flu"
2003–04	Angel	Nina Ash	Episodes: "Unleashed", "Smile Time", "Power Play"
2005	Return of the Living Dead: Rave to the Grave	Jenny	Television film
2006	Medium	Lydia Kyne	Episode: "Method to His Madness"
2007	Viva Laughlin	Geneva's sister Amy	Episodes: "Need You Tonight", "Bad Moon Rising", "Taking Care of Business", "Fighter"
2008	Crash	Tess Nolan / Theresa Nolanski	Recurring role, 7 episodes
2009	Chelsea Lately	Herself (Round Table)	Episode dated 28 October 2009
2010	Law & Order: LA	Carly Morris	Episode: "Playa Vista"
2011	CSI: NY	Detective Angela Sayer	Episode: "Life Sentence"
2011	Suits	Gabby Stone	Episode: "Tricks of the Trade"
2013	Hawaii Five-0	Dakota Hayes	Episode: "Pa'ani"
2013	Wilfred	Kim	Episode: "Sincerity"
2014	Chelsea Lately	Herself	Episode #8.98
2014	Girls	Courtney	Episodes: "I Saw You", "Two Plane Rides"
2015	Bachelor in Paradise: After Paradise	Herself	6 episodes
2016–17	Chelsea	Herself	7 episodes; also writer
2016	Chelsea Does	Herself	TV series documentary, also writer; episode: "Chelsea Does Marriage"
2016	Chicago Fire	Detective Bianca Holloway	Episodes: "What Happened to Courtney", "I Will Be Walking", "The Last One for Mom"
2016	I Like You Just the Way I Am	Jenny; producer, writer	Episodes: "Drone Attack", "You Were ALMOST Kidnapped", "Teets on a Plane", "Sex with Luke"
2019	The Bachelorette	Herself	Episodes: "Week 3"

== Selected works and publications ==
=== Books ===
- Mollen, Jenny (2014). I Like You Just the Way I Am: Stories About Me and Some Other People. New York: St. Martin's Press. ISBN 978-1-4668-3858-1. OCLC 886584103.
- Mollen, Jenny (2016). Live Fast Die Hot. New York: Doubleday. ISBN 978-0-385-54070-4. OCLC 951807583.

=== Periodicals ===
- Mollen, Jenny (January 13, 2012). "Blood on the Couch: A Tale of Making a Good First Impression". The Smoking Jacket. Playboy. Archived from the original on January 28, 2012.
- Mollen, Jenny (May 17, 2012). "What She Said: Jenny Mollen Goes Fifty Shades of Grey". The Smoking Jacket. Playboy. Archived from the original on May 20, 2012.
- Mollen, Jenny (January 7, 2014). "First Comes Miscarriage, Then Comes Marriage, Then Comes Baby". Cosmopolitan.
- Mollen, Jenny (July 2016). "Why Can't We Unfollow Our Exes?" (PDF). Cosmopolitan. pp. 48–49.
- Mollen, Jenny (July 17, 2017). "Actress and Author Jenny Mollen Opens Up About Her Family's Scary Health Crisis". Marie Claire.
- Mollen, Jenny (March 1, 2018). "Bedtime at the Biggs House". Parents.
- Mollen, Jenny (February 6, 2019). "Jenny Mollen Shares How Her Own Childhood Inspired Her to Pack Her Son's 'Dictator Lunches'". Parents.
