= Influenced (film) =

2026 American comedy film

- Theatrical release poster
- Directed by: Rachel Israel
- Written by: Jill Kargman; Carol Hartsell; Sean Crespo
- Produced by: SJ Allocco-St. Germain; Arielle Haller-Silverstone; Mandy Ward; Steven Ast
- Starring: Jill Kargman; Laura Bell Bundy; Justin Bartha; Eugene Cordero; Clara Wong; Nathan Lee Graham; Christine Taylor; Jessica Capshaw; David Krumholtz; Dan Hedaya
- Cinematography: Daniel Vecchione
- Edited by: Michael Berenbaum
- Music by: Josh Landau
- Production companies: Tiny Office Productions; Akward Productions; Iocane Productions
- Distributed by: Menemsha Films; Brainstorm Media
- Release dates: January 18, 2026 (MJFF); May 8, 2026 (United States)
- Running time: 88 minutes
- Country: United States
- Language: English
- Box office: $13,100

Influenced is a 2026 American comedy film directed by Rachel Israel from a screenplay by Jill Kargman, Carol Hartsell and Sean Crespo. It stars Kargman, Laura Bell Bundy, Justin Bartha, Eugene Cordero, Clara Wong, Nathan Lee Graham, Christine Taylor, Jessica Capshaw, Jason Biggs, David Krumholtz and Dan Hedaya, with Gwyneth Paltrow, Drew Barrymore, and Matt Damon in cameo roles.

It had its world premiere at the Miami Jewish Film Festival on January 18, 2026, and was released on May 8, 2026, by Menemsha Films and Brainstorm Media.

== Plot ==
The film follows a newly divorced Jewish mother in Manhattan who attempts to reach one million instagram followers and enter the Upper East Side influencer scene while helping her twins prepare for their bar and bat mitzvah. At the twins' celebration, their study of b'tzelem Elohim—the teaching that human beings are created in the image of God—inspires them to establish a charity. After bonding with Blagdanarova Hammerman, a Latvian socialite immigrant, she embarks on a journey to help others that leads her to reconnect with her husband.

== Cast ==
- Jill Kargman as Dzanielle
- Gwyneth Paltrow as Kim, Dzanielle's cousin
- Drew Barrymore as herself
- Jason Biggs as Thief, who robs the nail salon
- David Krumholtz as Gary, an "unhoused" man
- Christine Taylor as McKinley, Dzanielle's friend
- Jessica Capshaw as Amy, Dzanielle's friend
- Justin Bartha as Jordan, Dzanielle's husband
- Laura Bell Bundy as Blagdanorova Hammerman, Dzanielle's new friend from Latvia
- Eugene Cordero as Yuki, a well known dog-walker
- Clara Wong as Zhija Du, a pregnant nail salon worker
- Jenny Mollen as Liz Hittler, Dzanielle's friend
- Sol Miranda as Pillar, Dzanielle's housekeeper
- Olli Haaskivi as Mike
- Nathan Lee Graham as Connor, Blagdanarova's butler
- Dan Hedaya as Morty Hammerman, Blagdanarova's husband
- Rebecca Naomi Jones as Pam, Dzanielle's friend
- Mindy Cohn as Tess, Blagdanarova's assistant
- Judd Goodstein as Jared, Dzanielle's son
- Ellie Biron as Dhakota, Dzanielle's daughter
- Matt Damon as himself

== Production ==
In July 2024, it was announced Jill Kargman, Gwyneth Paltrow, Drew Barrymore, Jason Biggs, David Krumholtz, Christine Taylor, Jessica Capshaw, Justin Bartha, Laura Bell Bundy, Eugene Cordero, Clara Wong, Jenny Mollen, Sol Miranda, Olli Haaskivi, Nathan Lee Graham, and Dan Hedaya had joined the cast of the film, titled Miracle on 74th Street, with Rachel Israel directing from a screenplay by Kargman, Carol Hartsell, and Sean Crespo. Principal photography had concluded in New York.

== Release ==
Influenced had its world premiere at the Miami Jewish Film Festival on January 18, 2026. It also screened at the Atlanta Jewish Film Festival on February 25, 2026. Menemsha Films and Brainstorm Media will distribute the film in the United States. It was released in the United States on May 8, 2026.
