= Quarantine L.A. =

- Directed by: Filip Maciejewicz
- Written by: Filip Maciejewicz
- Starring: Bo Linton; Eugenia Kuzmina; Adrian Voo
- Cinematography: Jessica Gallant
- Music by: Tom Jemmott
- Production company: Magic Elevator Productions
- Release dates: March 9, 2013 (Los Angeles premiere); February 2, 2016 (United States)
- Running time: 82 min
- Country: United States
- Language: English

Quarantine L.A., also known as Infected, is a 2013 American action horror film about seven strangers who band together for survival in the aftermath of a devastating viral outbreak. The film was written and directed by Filip Maciejewicz, in his directorial debut, and starred Bo Linton, Eugenia Kuzmina and Adrian Voo.

== Plot ==
July 18, 2017 - An unknown type of virus starts to spread all over the Los Angeles area. In the first 14 days, it kills more than 3/4 of the population causing a major panic outbreak all around the world. The U.S. government isolates the entire affected zone. By the middle of September, the structure of the virus strain begins to evolve into a human changing virus. The infected become rotting, corpse-like zombie-vampire hybrid creatures with an unconditional hunger for human flesh and blood. During the day, they hide from the sun due to their fear of light as they burn to death if exposed to it. By night, they begin to hunt like animals. All efforts to search for survivors in the area were deemed futile.

On November 26, a local news channel receives an exclusive video message from J.S.O.C. (Joint Special Operations Command) Chief Sergeant, Jake Miller. The video exposes that he and a group of six survivors are trapped in the infected zone and surviving on limited supplies and resources. The video was not well received by the J.S.O.C. special opts team who had previously announced that there were no survivors from the infected zone, and a nuclear bomb is now set to decontaminate Los Angeles via annihilation, allowing the corrupt Federal government of the United States to cover the citywide epidemic as a nuclear accident to ensure Los Angeles no longer exists.

== Cast ==
- Bo Linton as Jake Miller
- Eugenia Kuzmina as Arlene Balric
- Adrian Voo as Quentin Mayers
- Adia Dinh as Jenny Darcy
- Nina Kate as Kim Harding
- Dillaran Martin as Jared Quinn
- Timon Morales as Flynn Wilson
- Robert Coffie as featured Zombie

== Release ==
The film premiered under its original title Infected in Los Angeles on March 9, 2013, at the historic New Beverly Cinema. The international premiere was held on March 18, 2013, in Hong Kong, as part of HKTDC Hong Kong International Film & TV Market (FILMART). It screened at various film festivals and was released internationally as Infected on DVD and Blu-Ray.

The film was repackaged as Quarantine L.A. and released in the U.S. on February 2, 2016.
