= Cattle Call (film) =

- Film poster
- Directed by: Martin Guigui
- Written by: Martin Guigui
- Starring: Thomas Ian Nicholas; Jenny Mollen; Nicole Eggert; Diedrich Bader
- Cinematography: Massimo Zeri
- Edited by: Thomas DiCandia; Debra Goldfield
- Music by: Cody Westheimer
- Production companies: National Lampoon Productions; ProActive Media Group
- Distributed by: Lionsgate Films
- Release date: June 1, 2006
- Running time: 83 minutes
- Country: United States
- Language: English

National Lampoon Presents Cattle Call (also known as National Lampoon's Cattle Call and simply Cattle Call) is a 2006 American comedy film under the National Lampoon label written and directed by Martin Guigui, and starring Thomas Ian Nicholas, Jenny Mollen, Nicole Eggert, and Diedrich Bader. It was Chelsea Handler's feature film debut, and includes cameo appearances from Paul Mazursky and Jonathan Winters. The film was released direct-to-video on May 13, 2008, by Lionsgate Home Entertainment.

== Plot ==
Cattle Call follows the three male protagonists as they hold a fake casting call in Hollywood for a fictional independent film entitled Perfect for Me with the hope of meeting women. Richie is looking for a relationship, while Sherman and Glenn are more interested in sex. After going on dates with the girls, they eventually chose three women to be in their "film": Marina, Laurel and Nikita.

When Marina checks Richie's computer to find a dating site called Perfect for Me, he feels guilty and reveals to her that the whole thing was set up for the three men to find women. She storms out of his house and meets up with the other two girls at the empty 'casting studio'. It turns out that one of the other women isn't really an actress at all, and is investigating the three guys following complaints on the internet that the casting was a scam.

The girls ask to have a first read through audition of the 'script' (a translation of an old foreign language film that the guys had seen) and then tell the guys that they want to make the script 'sexier' and that they want to have much sex with the three producers to practice. The women set up a hotel room with cameras, and film Sherman and Glenn preparing to have sex with them - Richie refuses and leaves. They instead send in two undercover women posing as dominatrices, leading to a police raid and the arrest of Sherman and Glenn.

After a night in jail, the two go to court facing 10–15 years imprisonment and a fine of up to $250,000. The judge, Solomon Mendel, allows 24 hours for the defense to prepare evidence. Richie, stuck for ideas whilst watching a reality show Real Cops on TV, suddenly realizes he can make a film from the footage of the casting that they have. He reaches the court the next morning just as a verdict has been announced, but the judge allows the evidence and finds Sherman and Glenn not guilty.

In the final scenes before the credits, Richie apologizes to Marina again and as her (ex-)boyfriend departs he realizes that she isn't leaving and they kiss. Three final quick closing scenes follow this. The first show Nikita running a casting call with men, in a project called Fresh Meat. The second shows Glenn working as the director on a Spanish-speaking set, pretending to speak Spanish to the production crew. The very final scene shows Sherman revealing to Richie that he is a sex addict; Richie doesn't believe it, and jokes that next Sherman will be starting a therapy group so he can meet female sex addicts. After a long pause Sherman replies "That's a great idea."

== Cast ==
- Thomas Ian Nicholas as Richie Rey
- Andrew Katos as Sherman Oaks
- Diedrich Bader as Glenn Dale
- Jenny Mollen as Marina Dell
- Nicole Eggert as Laurel Canyon
- Chelsea Handler as Nikita
- Jonathan Winters as Thomas
- Paul Mazursky as Mendel

== Release ==
Cattle Call premiered at the Palms Casino Resort in Las Vegas, Nevada, on June 1, 2006.

Lionsgate Home Entertainment released the film direct-to-video on May 13, 2008.

== Reception ==
The film was received with mostly negative reviews.
