= Dear Dictator =

- Theatrical release poster
- Directed by: Lisa Addario; Joe Syracuse
- Written by: Lisa Addario; Joe Syracuse
- Produced by: Mary Aloe; Lucas Jarach; Jorge Garcia Castro; Robert Ogden Barnum; Daniel Grodnik; Jake Shapiro
- Starring: Michael Caine; Katie Holmes; Odeya Rush; Seth Green; Jason Biggs
- Cinematography: Wyatt Troll
- Edited by: Kent Beyda
- Music by: Sebastián Kauderer
- Production companies: Fortitude Films; Hector Coup; Defiant Pictures; Coastal Film Studios
- Distributed by: Cinedigm; Universal Pictures
- Release date: March 16, 2018 (United States)
- Running time: 90 minutes
- Country: United States
- Language: English
- Budget: $6.7 million

Dear Dictator is a 2018 American satire comedy film written and directed by Lisa Addario and Joe Syracuse. The film stars Michael Caine, Katie Holmes, Odeya Rush, Seth Green, and Jason Biggs.

The plot follows a 16-year-old American girl who becomes the pen pal of a notorious island nation dictator even when he is deposed.

== Plot ==
Tatiana Mills (Odeya Rush), a 16-year-old American girl, lives a quasi-chaotic life with her single mother Darlene (Katie Holmes), who is in a complex romantic relationship with her married boss Dr. Charles (Seth Green) who is a dentist with a foot fetish. In a letter-writing exercise started by her Social studies teacher Mr. Spines (Jason Biggs), Tatiana becomes pen pals with Anton Vincent (Michael Caine), a notorious island nation dictator.

When Vincent is deposed by his own people, who rise up against his violent and oppressive rule, he disappears, causing Tatiana to worry about his safety. A few days later, he unexpectedly arrives in the United States and seeks refuge in Tatiana's suburban garage. There, he develops a grandfatherly relationship with the teen and her struggling mother, becoming a useful man around the house while organizing his restoration as a leader with loyalist forces back in his unnamed homeland.

Anton shifts his focus to Tatiana's high school life and her desire to deliver payback to the popular girls who bully her. He makes her a dictator-in-training and teaches her to rise to power in her school in a similar way to his ascent to power in the Caribbean. Ultimately his plans go too far, putting him at odds with Tatiana, who also comes under investigation from the security services who have picked up on Anton's communication with his loyalist forces and suspect she is involved with terrorism.

The police interview Tatiana and Darlene and search their house, blissfully unaware that the old man in the house is Anton Vincent – whose whereabouts are unknown. No evidence is found and they are released, but upon release, Tatiana informs the police that the old man is Vincent and he is arrested pending extradition.

== Cast ==
- Michael Caine as General Anton Vincent
- Katie Holmes as Darlene Mills
- Odeya Rush as Tatiana Mills
- Seth Green as Dr. Charles Seaver
- Jason Biggs as Mr. Spines
- Jackson Beard as Denny
- Jay Willick as Det. Diggs
- Adrian Voo as Neighbor
- Fish Myrr as Sarvia
- Hannah Joy Brown as Chivas
- Jordyn Cavros as Gigi
- Tony Guerrero as Pastor Ramirez
- Dana Joyce Schiller as Detective Spano
- Jacob Grodnik as Teddy

== Production ==
The script was shown among the 2006 Black List of unproduced scripts. Also in 2006, the script was presented as a staged reading at the Nantucket Film Festival. Alfred Molina, Robert De Niro and Anthony Hopkins were previously attached as the dictator role. On June 8, 2016, Michael Caine and Maisie Williams were announced as the lead stars of the film.

Executive production responsibilities were handled by a large group including Paul Brett, Peter Nichols, Stewart Peter, James Swarbrick, Anders Erden, Tim Smith, Dennis Stuart Murphy, Adrian Voo, Nadine De Barros, Nicolas Veinberg, Kevin Scott Frakes, Buddy Patrick, Sean Glover, Lila Janakievski, George Nedelkovski, Michael Clofine, Wayne Chang, and Paul English.

Principal photography on the film began on July 29, 2016, at 402 Arlington rd. in Savannah, Georgia. First photographs of Katie Holmes and Odeya Rush filming scenes for the film were published on E! News on July 31, 2016. Production wrapped in October 2016.

== Release ==
Dear Dictator held advance screenings, under its working title Coup d'Etat, at the Nantucket Film Festival, New Jersey Indie Street Film Festival, Carmel International Film Festival and the Napa Valley Film Festival.

Cinedigm released the film in North America simultaneously in theaters and on video on demand on March 16, 2018, followed by a DVD release on April 24, 2018. The first trailer was released on January 17, 2018.

=== Critical response ===
The film received negative reviews, but the performances of Caine and Rush were praised. On review aggregator website Rotten Tomatoes, the film holds an approval rating of 16% based on 25 reviews, and an average rating of 3.8/10. The site's critical consensus reads, "Dear Dictator never comes close to taking advantage of its wildly silly premise -- or the assortment of talented veterans who round out the cast." On Metacritic, the film has a weighted average score of 44 out of 100, based on 8 critics, indicating "mixed or average" reviews. The Hollywood Reporter reviewer Justin Lowe commended the film, suggesting "If only every international political crisis were this amusing."

== See also ==
- Sarah York, American who became the pen pal of Manuel Noriega, then the de facto ruler of Panama, at age 10
- Samantha Smith
- List of fictional dictators
- Michael Caine filmography
