= Amateur Night (film) =

- Theatrical release poster
- Directed by: Lisa Addario; Joe Syracuse
- Written by: Lisa Addario; Joe Syracuse
- Produced by: Jorge Garcia Castro; Mary Pat Bentel; Diego del Río Toca; Shana Eddy-Grouf
- Starring: Jason Biggs; Jenny Mollen; Janet Montgomery; Ashley Tisdale; Bria Murphy
- Cinematography: Nicole Whitaker
- Edited by: Greg O'Bryant
- Music by: The Newton Brothers
- Distributed by: Cinedigm
- Release date: August 5, 2016
- Running time: 92 minutes
- Country: United States
- Language: English
- Box office: $62,933

Amateur Night is a 2016 American crime sex comedy film written and directed by Lisa Addario and Joe Syracuse. Their early experiences in Hollywood were the basis for the plot of the film. The film stars Jason Biggs, Jenny Mollen, Janet Montgomery, Ashley Tisdale and Bria Murphy.

Amateur Night held its world premiere in Los Angeles on July 25, 2016, and was theatrically released in the United States on August 5, 2016, by Cinedigm. The film was panned by critics, and grossed a mere $62,933.

== Plot ==
Guy Carter (Jason Biggs) is an unemployed architect struggling to make ends meet. With bills piling up, his wife Anne (Jenny Mollen) finds a job posting on Craigslist for a driver and sends Guy, against his will, for the job. Guy then goes for the interview expecting to be a pizza driver but finds himself as a chauffeur for a prostitute named Nikki (Janet Montgomery).

Nikki tells Guy that their first stop would be a regular of hers, a kinky doctor in Bel Air (Steven Weber). She tells Guy to wait in the car for her but when she doesn't respond for hours, Guy decides to break into the house. He finds Nikki in a compromising bondage position and thinks that the doctor is torturing Nikki, and tries to rescue her by spraying him with air freshener. They both then flee from the scene after the doctor falls over the ground and hits his head.

Guy is horrified by the situation but is calmed down by Nikki. She then informs him about the duties that came with the job and that he gets a cut of the "take", which prompts Guy to now be very interested in the job. They then proceed to pick up two other prostitutes, Jaxi (Bria Murphy) and Fallon (Ashley Tisdale), for a bachelor party. At the house, Guy is ordered to wash the "hardware," referring to a large bag filled with very messy sex toys.

The four then head to a fancy hotel in Beverly Hills for the bachelor party. The party is filled with over excited testosterone-driven former frat boys. The girls then appoint Guy to play "pimp" to get the frat boys in line. What follows is various strip teases and sexually explicit dancing, followed by a "main event," involving Fallon ejaculating directly on Guy.

Guy leaves the party momentarily when Anne goes into false labor. To his dismay, he runs into the doctor he assaulted, who ends up holding him hostage with a syringe filled with a paralyzing drug, and orders Guy to take him to Nikki. At their arrival, the doctor's plans are foiled when Nikki causes him to stab himself with the syringe. The bachelor party then resumes at full speed but comes to a halt when the girls find themselves robbed. The girls then hold the entire bachelor party at gun point, demanding the return of their money. They chase the culprit down long halls and end up urinating on him before taking back their money.

As they leave the hotel, one of the bachelor party guy approaches Nikki and asks for a "quickie." It is then revealed that he is an undercover cop and he attempts to arrest Nikki. This prompts Guy to once again rescue her and they are caught in a cop car chase. The four manage to escape the cops but end up crashing Guy's car. They continue to escape on a bus.

They return, exhausted, to their homes in the early morning. Nikki thanks Guy by hiring him to design a house for her and tells him the "hardware" will be awaiting him for the next round. Guy expects arresting cops to be at his house but it turns out his car was found by "repo men" and hauled away before the cops could find it.

Being based on a true story, the credits play over scenes that actually took place.

== Cast ==
- Jason Biggs as Guy Carter
- Jenny Mollen as Anne Carter
- Janet Montgomery as Nikki
- Ashley Tisdale as Fallon
- Bria Murphy as Jaxi
- Adrian Voo as Best Man Dan
- Robert Hoffman as Devon
- Cedric Yarbrough as Zoley
- Steven Weber as Dr. Kurtz
- Eric Siegel as Dr. Siegel
- Rusty Joiner as Cocky Dude
- David J. Phillips as The Bachelor

== Production ==
=== Casting ===
In late 2014, Entertainment Weekly announced that Jason Biggs and Ashley Tisdale would lead the cast of Drive, She Said. Janet Montgomery, Bria Murphy, Jenny Mollen, Adrian Voo and Steven Weber would round out the cast.

=== Filming ===
Drive, She Said was one of the few productions in 2014 to receive a California State Tax Credit for filming in Los Angeles.

On November 22, Tisdale was photographed arriving to an undisclosed film set in Los Angeles, script in hand. On December 5, The Hollywood Reporter announced that the film had wrapped production. E! Online published a NSFW still of Murphy in character the following day.

== Release ==
In January 2016, it was announced Cinedigm had acquired North American distribution rights to the film and planned a mid-2016 domestic theatrical release. On May 5, People magazine announced that film would be released in theaters on August 5 and shared the first official trailer and poster.

=== Home media ===
In North America, Amateur Night was released on digital download on August 12, 2016, and DVD on October 4, 2016.

The film was released in the United Kingdom as The Escorts on June 12, 2017.

== Reception ==
Amateur Night was panned by critics. On Rotten Tomatoes the film has an approval rating of 0% based on reviews from 6 critics. On Metacritic the film has a score of 38 out of 100 based on reviews from 5 critics, indicating "generally unfavorable" reviews.

J Don Birnam of Latino Review gave the film a B− grade and noted that "to deny that Amateur Night made me laugh in its crass immaturity would be dishonest. I laughed." Michael Rechtshaffen of Los Angeles Times noted that "the film insistently asserts its autobiographical roots at the expense of sharper plotting and characterizations, not to mention more energetic pacing." Chris Packham of Village Voice called the film "uninspired" but praised the script's narrative reversal and Montgomery's performance. Frank Scheck of The Hollywood Reporter commented that the film "gives sex comedies a bad name" but praised Biggs and Montgomery's chemistry. Keith Watson of Slant Magazine commented that "the film is peppered with interesting true-life details, but these are overwhelmed by frantic comedic sequences." Jason Ooi of The Playlist gave the film a C− grade and wrote "though based on a true story, Amateur Night still feels like just another raunchy comedy."
