= My Best Friend's Girl (2008 film) =

- Theatrical release poster
- Directed by: Howard Deutch
- Written by: Jordan Cahan
- Produced by: Guymon Casady; Adam Herz; Doug Johnson; Barry Katz; Gregory Lessans; Josh Shader; Brian Volk-Weiss
- Starring: Dane Cook; Kate Hudson; Jason Biggs; Lizzy Caplan; Alec Baldwin
- Cinematography: Jack N. Green
- Edited by: Seth Flaum
- Music by: John Debney
- Production companies: Lionsgate; Terra Firma Films; Management 360; Superfinger Entertainment
- Distributed by: Lionsgate
- Release date: September 19, 2008
- Running time: 101 minutes
- Country: United States
- Language: English
- Budget: $20 million
- Box office: $41.6 million

My Best Friend's Girl is a 2008 American romantic comedy film directed by Howard Deutch, written by Jordan Cahan, and starring Dane Cook, Kate Hudson, Jason Biggs, Diora Baird, Alec Baldwin, Riki Lindhome and Lizzy Caplan. It was released on September 19, 2008, by Lionsgate. The film received generally negative reviews from critics and grossed $41.6 million against a $20 million budget. As of 2024, it is the last film Deutch has directed.

== Plot ==
Sherman "Tank" Turner is a help-line operator and a ladies' man with a side hustle: He helps gentlemen who want their ladies back by taking the women on a disastrous date. Throughout the evening, Tank behaves like a rude, vulgar Neanderthal, causing the woman he's out with to realize her ex is not really so bad after all and go back to him.

Tank shares an apartment with his step cousin Dustin who has fallen for his colleague Alexis. Dustin takes her on a date, professing his love, but she insists they remain friends. After the date, he explains his situation to Tank, who volunteers his services for free as a good friend. Initially turning him down, the next day, he sees Alexis flirting with another co-worker and begs Tank to take her out and he accepts.

Tank bumps into Alexis, and they arrange to go out. He behaves obnoxiously all night, but she is either too drunk to care, or finds it fun. When he drops her off, she expects him to come in, but he resists out of loyalty to Dustin. Alexis calls Dustin, but when they meet, she explains that the date with Tank has motivated her to see other men.

Dustin sends Alexis roses and an apology poem in Tank's name, and she calls him, berating him for leaving early the previous night. Tank goes to see her, and they end up having casual sex on a regular basis while Dustin begins various desperate attempts to stay friends with her.

Dustin prepares to go on a date with a single mother, but when he arrives to pick her up, she is breast-feeding her child. In an effort to be funny, he remarks that he would like to have what the baby is having. Creeped out, she angrily yells at Dustin, throwing him out and cancelling their date.

Distraught, Dustin goes to Alexis's but is told by her roommate that she is upstairs with the guy she has been having sex with regularly. Becoming even more upset and refusing to leave, he starts to walk up the stairs only to discover that the man Alexis has been sleeping with is Tank.

Tank and Dustin get into a fight and go their separate ways. Tank's feelings for Alexis have grown, and he decides to consult with his father. After talking with him, he has doubts that he deserves a serious relationship with her.

Keeping a date with Hilary, a keenly Christian woman who he has promised a fellow office worker to have a bad date with, he hurts Hilary's feelings. After he apologizes, they eat and talk about his side hustle.

English teacher Hilary invites Tank and Alexis to a 1970's style prom. There, Tank and Alexis connect more. While attending the wedding of Alexis's sister Rachel, he recognizes her as one of his previous bad dates. The groom, Josh, asks him to keep quiet about his use of his services. After overhearing Alexis telling Rachel she has fallen for him, Tank's guilt causes him to sabotage their relationship and apologize to Dustin.

Dustin arrives at the wedding reception, revealing Tank's schemes to Alexis. Tank points out his many clients there, including the groom, and is punched and thrown out. Alexis, distraught to have been one of the betrayed women, never wants to see either of them again. Later, while talking with Dustin and his father, Tank realizes that he loves Alexis, so they encourage him to reconcile with her. He jogs with her for miles in an attempt to make amends, but Alexis is unmoved.

Three months later, Tank is on a date when Alexis sees him and decides to embarrass him. Throwing wine in his face, she then announces to the whole restaurant that he left her pregnant. He catches on to her "joke", and they continue to loudly exchange insults, each trying to best the other in a "play argument", after which they reconcile with a kiss.

Meanwhile, Dustin and Alexis's roommate Ami sleep together after realizing their common sexual interests.

== Cast ==
- Dane Cook as Sherman 'Tank' Turner, a help line operator with a side business of taking ladies on nightmarish dates.
- Kate Hudson as Alexis, Dustin's co-worker and Tank's love interest.
- Jason Biggs as Dustin, Tank's best friend and roommate.
- Lizzy Caplan as Ami, Alexis's best friend and roommate.
- Alec Baldwin as Professor William Turner, Tank's father.
- Riki Lindhome as Hilary, a deeply Christian girl.
- Diora Baird as Rachel, Alexis's younger sister and one of Tank's bad dates.
- Mini Anden as Lizzy, one of Tank's one-night-stands.
- Malcolm Barrett as Dwalu, Tank's friend and colleague from the call center.
- Hilary Pingle as Claire
- Faye Grant as Merrilee
- Taran Killam as Josh, Rachel's groom.
- Jenny Mollen as Colleen, the new girl
- Robert Fennessy II as the Bartender
- Brad Garrett uncredited cameo as angry customer on phone.
- Nate Torrence as Craig
- Johnny Serret as Prom Date (uncredited)

== Production ==
The film, originally titled Bachelor No. 2, began shooting in Boston in August 2007.

== Soundtrack ==
The soundtrack available for purchase does not include every song.

- "Do Me" - Jean Knight
- "You're No Good" - Linda Ronstadt
- "My Best Friend's Girl" - The Cars
- "Love Is Like Oxygen" - Sweet
- "99 Red Balloons" - Nena
- "Crimson and Clover" - Tommy James and the Shondells
- "At Last" - Etta James
- "Have a Little Faith in Me" - John Hiatt
- "Save Some" - Glacier Hiking
- "Blue" - Malbec
- "Always Where I Need To Be" - The Kooks
- "Pop That Pussy" - 2 Live Crew
- "Separate Ways" - Teddy Thompson
- "Best Friends Again/I Love You" - John Debney
- "The Man Comes Around" - Johnny Cash

== Reception ==
=== Critical response ===
On review aggregation website Rotten Tomatoes the film has an approval rating of 14% based on 58 reviews, with an average rating of 3.4/10. The website's critics consensus reads: "My Best Friend's Girl spends too much time being vulgar and offensive, leaving little room for laughs." On Metacritic the film has a weighted average score of 34 out of 100, based on 13 critics, indicating "generally unfavorable" reviews. Audiences polled by CinemaScore gave the film an average grade of "B−" on an A+ to F scale.

My Best Friend's Girl earned a Razzie Award nomination for Worst Actress (Kate Hudson; also for Fool's Gold). Dane Cook also criticized the film poster, saying it looked poorly photoshopped and that the artist must have been forced to work under duress and with very little time.

=== Box office ===
The film opened at No. 3 at the North American box office making $8,265,357 in its opening weekend. It went on to gross $41.6 million worldwide.

== Home media ==
The film was released on home video January 13, 2009.
