= Sol Miranda =

American actress

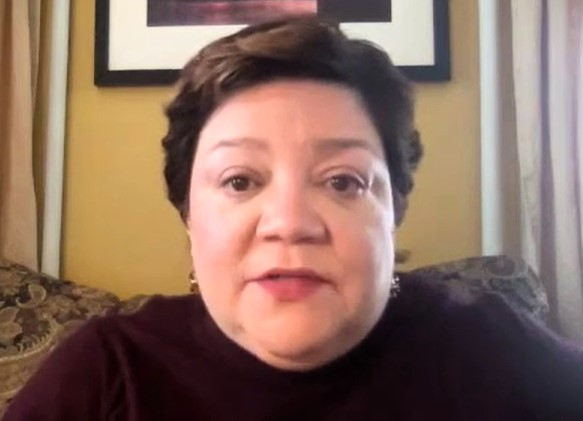
- Miranda interviewed about her 2023 film Come Find Me
- Education: University of Puerto Rico, Río Piedras (BA); University of California, San Diego (MFA)
- Occupations: Actress; Visual and performing arts professor
- Years active: 1999–present

Sol Miranda is a Puerto Rican actress. She played "mole woman" Donna Maria Nuñez on Unbreakable Kimmy Schmidt (2015–2019). She is an adjunct assistant professor at Hostos Community College and the founder of Embark Peekskill, a nonprofit which supports the arts in Peekskill, New York.

== Life and career ==
Miranda was born in Puerto Rico. She received a BA in drama from the University of Puerto Rico, Río Piedras Campus, and an MFA in acting from the University of California, San Diego. She later moved to Brooklyn, New York City, and worked in English-language Latino theater productions and briefly with the Puerto Rican Traveling Theater. In 1995, she began teaching as an adjunct assistant professor of visual and performing arts at Hostos Community College and in 2004, reintroduced the Hostos Repertory Company.

Around 2000, Miranda and her husband moved to Peekskill, New York, as they had heard about the town's burgeoning arts scene, and it was close enough to New York City for Miranda to continue auditioning for roles. Miranda founded Embark Peekskill, a 501(c)(3) organization which supports the development of a performing and literary arts center in the town.

=== Performance ===
After finishing graduate school in the 1990s, Miranda moved to Seattle, where her first professional performance was Real Women Have Curves. Subsequently, Miranda, who regularly performs Spanish voice-overs, made her first screen appearance on Law & Order. She later made two more Law & Order appearances, playing various characters, made a cameo appearance on the television series Blue Bloods, and acted in A Gifted Man. Miranda had film roles in Arthur Newman (2012) and Jack, Jules, Esther and Me (2013).

In May 2014, Miranda was cast in Tina Fey and Robert Carlock's sitcom Unbreakable Kimmy Schmidt. Miranda plays Donna Maria Nuñez, a "no-nonsense" maid who was trapped in a bunker with the title character (played by Ellie Kemper) and two other women. Once part of a doomsday cult, the women were called "mole women" after being freed. On the role, Miranda said, "It's not easy – it's a balancing act. Latinos are very underrepresented. You make it happen and you justify it. There are Latinos who are maids, just like there are Latinos who are doctors. You give the role integrity and do it." Netflix, which bought the series from NBC, eventually ordered four seasons.

Miranda created the one-woman show I Am Here. I Belong. This is Peekskill a Friendly Town, which she performed on October 14 and 15, 2017. It is based on stories of Miranda's experience as an immigrant woman in Peekskill.

== Filmography ==
=== Television ===
Year	Title	Role	Notes	Ref.
1999	Law & Order	Anna Mollinedo	Episode: "Merger"	
2003	Law & Order	Lucy	Episode: "Ill-Conceived"	
2005	Law & Order	Rita Hernandez	Episode: "Lifeline"	
2008	The Return of Jezebel James	Carmen	Episode: "Needles & Schlag"	
2008	Living in Captivity	Dr. No	Television film	
2010	Blue Bloods	Mrs. Campos	Episode: "Pilot"	
2012	A Gifted Man	Cecilia Gonzales	Episode: "In Case of (Re)Birth"	
2015	The Bar Mitzvah Club	Rosa	Television film	
2015–2020	Unbreakable Kimmy Schmidt	Donna Maria Nuñez	Recurring Role	

=== Film ===
Year	Title	Role	Notes	Ref.
2012	Arthur Newman	Rosita Tully		
2013	Jack, Jules, Esther and Me	Luis' Mom		
2026	Influenced			
