= Seventy-Nine (film) =

2013 American science fiction film

- Official poster
- Directed by: Filip Maciejewicz
- Written by: Filip Maciejewicz
- Produced by: Jeff Solema; Berenika Maciejewicz
- Starring: Adrian Voo; Jonathan Rosenthal; Bo Linton; Christine Springett; Athena Baumeister; Patrick Edward Wynne; Kathinka van Putten
- Cinematography: Megan Richardson
- Edited by: Michael Whitton
- Music by: Darren Wonnacott
- Distributed by: Cardinal XD
- Release date: 2013
- Running time: 85 minutes
- Country: United States
- Language: English

Seventy-Nine, also known as 79th Patient and The Asylum, is an American direct-to-video science-fiction film written and directed by Filip Maciejewicz. The film stars an ensemble cast that includes Adrian Voo, Jonathan Rosenthal and Bo Linton.

== Plot ==
In an abandoned asylum, doctors carry out secret experiments on unsuspecting patients who have been taken from their everyday lives and seemingly erased from existence. The experiments, codenamed Limes, are designed to cure violent episodes through new methods of brainwashing and mind manipulation. But as the experimental project begins to fail, chaos ensues in the hospital as patients seek revenge against their captors.

== Cast ==
- Adrian Voo as Isamu Tan
- Jonathan Rosenthal as Daniel Regardie
- Bo Linton as Ash Paine
- Christine Springett as Dharma Crowley
- Athena Baumeister as Hailey Dagger
- Patrick Edward Wynne as Ethan Gabriel
- Kathinka van Putten as Lily Borg
- Omar Hansen as Antero Leary
- Velta Moore as Jael Regardie
- Caroline Attwood as Sally Sanders

== Release ==
The first trailer was released on July 7, 2013. The film held its premiere in Los Angeles on September 7, 2013. The film later opened the Louisiana Sci-fi Film and Costume Festival on April 26, 2014, also winning an accolade for 'Best Directing'. The film was released direct-to-video on February 9, 2017, in the United Kingdom, and on June 16, 2017, in the United States.

== Reception ==
Reviewing the film, Phil Wheat of Nerdly commended the filmmakers for producing an intriguing film but noted that the film "falls completely off a cliff with bad storytelling, terrible ADR and camerawork that is horribly framed, poorly lit and uses pan and scan to show all the participants in a scene; plus the film has a ridiculously melodramatic soundtrack that is both overused and overwrought."
