= Texas Killing Fields (film) =

2011 American crime film by Ami Canaan Mann

- Theatrical release poster
- Directed by: Ami Canaan Mann
- Written by: Don Ferrarone
- Produced by: Michael Jaffe; Michael Mann
- Starring: Sam Worthington; Jeffrey Dean Morgan; Jessica Chastain; Chloë Grace Moretz
- Cinematography: Stuart Dryburgh
- Edited by: Cindy Mollo
- Music by: Dickon Hinchliffe
- Production companies: Forward Pass; Gideon Productions; Infinity Media; QED International; Watley Entertainment
- Distributed by: Anchor Bay Films
- Release date: October 14, 2011
- Running time: 115 minutes
- Country: United States
- Language: English
- Box office: $1.6 million

Texas Killing Fields (also known as The Fields) is a 2011 American crime film directed by Ami Canaan Mann and starring Sam Worthington, Jeffrey Dean Morgan, Jessica Chastain and Chloë Grace Moretz. It competed in the 68th Venice International Film Festival.

The film's screenplay was loosely inspired by the history of killings along 30-plus miles of the Interstate 45 (I-45) corridor between Houston and Galveston, in and around an area known as "the Killing Fields". The true events include the murders of women kidnapped from cities spread along the I-45 corridor and dumped in many areas, including various bayous surrounding the oil fields of Texas City, Texas. While in real life there have been several itinerant serial killers involved over the years, the film focuses on specific local Texas City suspects.

== Plot ==
Souder, a homicide detective in a small Texan town, and his partner, transplanted New York City cop Detective Heigh, track a sadistic serial killer dumping his victims' mutilated bodies in a nearby marsh locals call 'The Killing Fields'. Though the swampland crime scenes are outside their jurisdiction, Detective Heigh is unable to turn his back on solving the gruesome murders. Despite his partner's warnings, he sets out to investigate the crimes. Before long, the killer changes the game and begins hunting the detectives, teasing them with possible clues at the crime scenes while always remaining one step ahead. When local girl Ann goes missing, the detectives find themselves racing against time to catch the killer and save the young girl's life.

== Cast ==
- Sam Worthington as Detective Mike Souder
- Jeffrey Dean Morgan as Detective Brian Heigh
- Jessica Chastain as Detective Pam Stall
- Chloë Grace Moretz as Little Ann Sliger
- Jason Clarke as Rule Valley
- Annabeth Gish as Gwen Heigh
- Sheryl Lee as Lucie Sliger
- Stephen Graham as Rhino

== Production ==
The film was originally going to be directed by Danny Boyle before he left the project and was replaced by Ami Canaan Mann, daughter of director Michael Mann, who produced the film. Boyle said that the film was "so dark it would never get made".

The film was distributed overseas by Entertainment Film Distributors, a British company. Filming began on May 3, 2010, in Louisiana, United States.

== Soundtrack ==
The soundtrack was scored by Dickon Hinchliffe (formerly of Tindersticks) except for three tracks credited to The Americans.

== Reception ==
=== Critical response ===
On the review aggregator website Rotten Tomatoes, 39% of 44 critics' reviews are positive, with an average rating of 5.1/10. The website's consensus reads: "Texas Killing Fields is a competent boilerplate crime thriller, brewing up characters and plots used in better films." Metacritic, which uses a weighted average, assigned the film a score of 49 out of 100, based on 17 critics, indicating "mixed or average" reviews.

Roger Ebert of the Chicago Sun Times gave the film two out of four stars and said, "Texas Killing Fields begins along the lines of a police procedural and might have been perfectly absorbing if it had played by the rules: strict logic, attention to detail, reference to technical police work. Unfortunately, the movie often seems to stray from such discipline." Betsy Sharkey of the Los Angeles Times commented that "like the Texas City killer's plans, something's gone terribly wrong" with the film. On a more lenient note, James Mottram of GamesRadar wrote: "Mann Jr. shows plenty of promise in a film that doesn’t tarnish the family name. But hindered by niggling flaws, it hardly revolutionises an over-saturated genre."

=== Box office ===
Texas Killing Fields received a limited theatrical release domestically, in just 10 theatres, grossing $0.05 million, and $1.64 million in other territories, for a worldwide total of $1.69 million.
