= Haunt (2013 film) =

- Theatrical film poster
- Directed by: Mac Carter
- Written by: Andrew Barrer
- Produced by: Bill Block; Paul Hanson; John Hegeman; Anton Lessine; Sasha Shapiro; Steven Schneider
- Starring: Harrison Gilbertson; Liana Liberato; Ione Skye; Jacki Weaver
- Cinematography: Adam Marsden
- Edited by: Ruben Sebban
- Music by: Reinhold Heil
- Production companies: QED International; Revolver Picture Company
- Distributed by: IFC Midnight
- Release date: November 6, 2013 (Film Society of Lincoln Center)
- Running time: 89 minutes
- Country: United States
- Language: English

Haunt is a 2013 American supernatural horror film directed by Mac Carter in his feature film directorial debut. The film premiered at the Film Society of Lincoln Center on November 6, 2013, and was later released on video on demand on February 7, 2014. Haunt stars Harrison Gilbertson as a teenager who moves into a new house and goes through a terrifying haunting.

== Plot ==
Franklin tries to speak to his dead children using an EVP box. Soon thereafter, he is possessed by a ghost that apparently causes him to kill himself.

After this incident, a woman known as Dr. Morello begins narrating about her family being murdered one by one by an unknown force. When Evan Asher (Harrison Gilbertson) and his family move into the old Morello house some years later, they are unaware of its history. Unable to sleep, Evan goes for a walk and meets Samantha Richards (Liana Liberato). Evan begins experiencing paranormal activity and enlists Samantha's help to uncover what is going on.

The two teens explore the house and find the EVP box. Not expecting anything to happen, they use it to speak with the dead. Ghosts haunt the two teens as well as psychically contacting the youngest child. At the urging of Dr. Morello, Evan and Sam burn the box and the belongings of the previous owners. They also seal the small room in the attic where they found the box. Nevertheless, the ghost of a woman haunts them that night.

It is revealed to Sam in a vision that Frank Morello had an affair with his neighbor. This woman gave birth to Samantha. Doctor Morello found out about the affair and killed the woman. The woman is buried in the small room in the attic where Evan is staying. Sam is possessed by her mother's spirit who kills Evan with a hammer saying "You shouldn't have burned the box, you shouldn't have closed the room."

Sam is caught by Evan's father when she tries to open the wooden plank in the floor under which the woman's body is buried, calling out "Mommy" the whole time. She is arrested and taken away by the cops. The movie ends with the voice of Dr. Morello wondering if Evan will haunt that house forever like she believes the members of her family will.

== Cast ==
- Harrison Gilbertson as Evan Asher
- Liana Liberato as Samantha "Sam" Richards
- Jacki Weaver as Janet Morello
- Ione Skye as Emily Asher
- Brian Wimmer as Alan Asher
- Danielle Chuchran as Sara Asher
- Ella Harris as Anita Asher
- Carl Hadra as Franklin Morello
- Jan Broberg Felt as Meredith
- Kelly Noonan as Real Estate Agent
- Aline Andrade as Young Woman
- Jarrod Phillips as Man
- DeVille Vannik as Police Officer (as Devill Vannick)
- Maggie Scott as Youngest Morello Daughter
- Brenden Whitney as EMT
- Sebastian Michael Barr as Matthew Morello
- Kasia Kowalczyk as Demon Creature

== Production ==
Plans to film Haunt were officially announced in August 2012, with Mac Carter set to direct a script written by Andrew Barrer. Production and filming for the movie was set to begin in Utah in November 2012, and Jacki Weaver was confirmed to be performing in Haunt. In early 2013 QED International launched a viral website that detailed the fictional Morello House, portraying it as a real paranormal case study.

== Reception ==
Fearnet gave Haunt a mostly positive review, noting that while the film's story "won't win many awards for originality", Haunt did bring in some new ideas and that overall "it's a respectably old-school chiller that feels sort of refreshing after watching so many high-tech, post-modern, and uber-subversive horror flicks." In contrast, Shock Till You Drop gave the film a more mixed review, commenting that it was "competently made" but that "no matter how well-made it is, you have seen every minute of this movie before".
