= Jason Biggs =

American actor (born 1978)

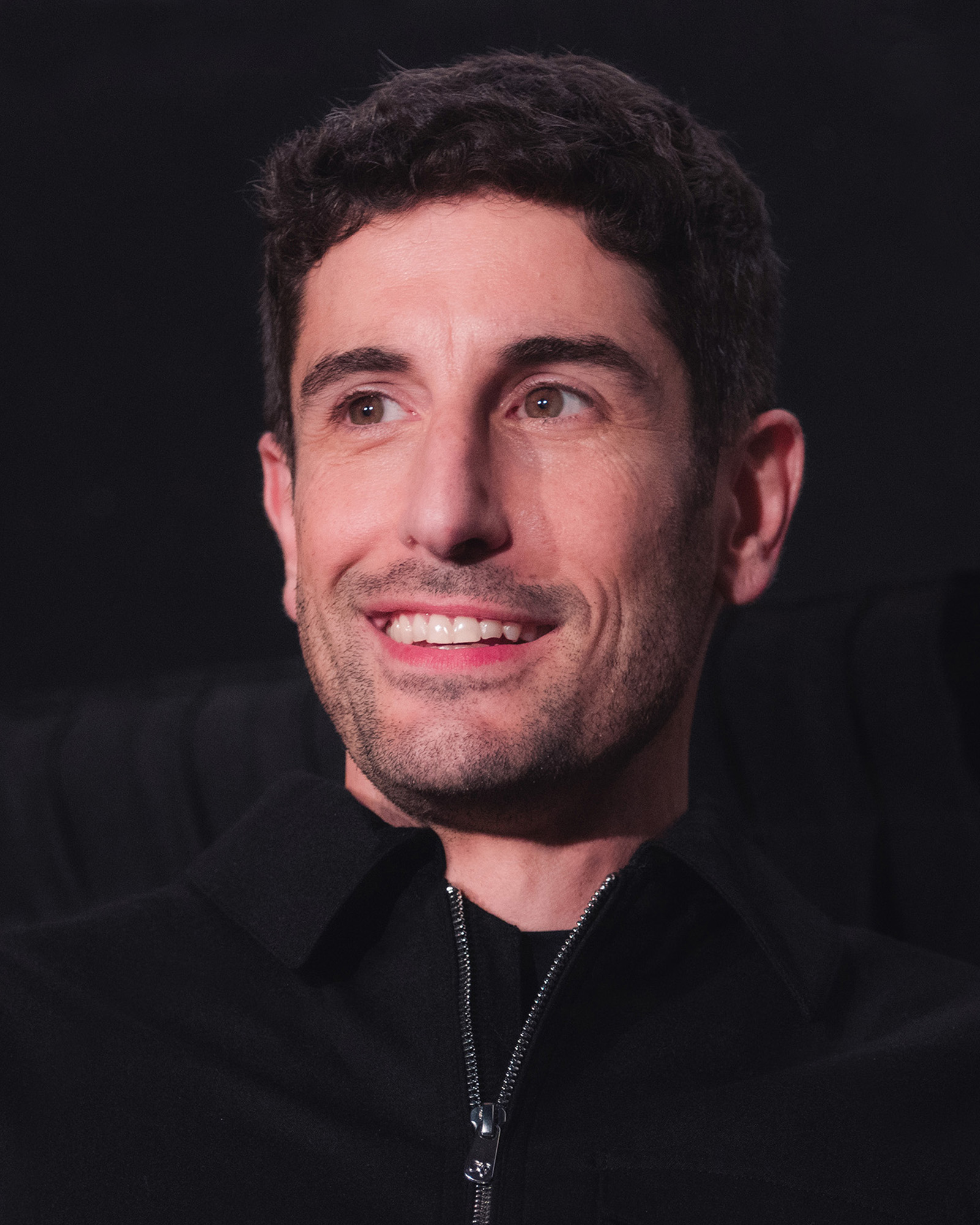
- Biggs in 2026
- Born: Jason Matthew Biggs; May 12, 1978 (age 48); Pompton Plains, New Jersey, U.S.
- Occupations: Actor; director; producer
- Years active: 1983–present
- Spouse: Jenny Mollen (m. 2008; sep. 2026)
- Children: 2

Jason Matthew Biggs (born May 12, 1978) is an American and Italian actor, director, and producer. From 1999 to 2012, he starred as Jim Levenstein in the American Pie film series. His other lead credits for film include Loser (2000), Saving Silverman (2001), Anything Else (2003), My Best Friend's Girl (2008), Life Happens (2011), Grassroots (2012), and Best. Christmas. Ever! (2023).

In television, Biggs is known for his lead roles as the voice of Leonardo in Teenage Mutant Ninja Turtles (2012–2014) and Larry Bloom in the Netflix original series Orange Is the New Black (2013–2014; 2017; 2019). The latter won him a Screen Actors Guild Award. His other television lead credits include Drexell's Class (1991–1992), Total Security (1997), Mad Love (2011), and Outmatched (2020). From 1994 to 1995, Biggs also had a supporting role on the soap opera As the World Turns (1994–1995).

== Early life and education ==
Jason Matthew Biggs was born on May 12, 1978, in Pompton Plains, New Jersey, to Angela (née Zocco), a nurse, and Gary Louis Biggs, a shipping company manager. His father is of English and Italian descent and his mother is of Sicilian descent. His last name is derived from his English ancestry. He was raised Catholic.

Biggs grew up in Hasbrouck Heights and attended Hasbrouck Heights High School, where he achieved success in tennis. He attended New York University before transferring to Montclair State University, where he eventually dropped out.

== Career ==
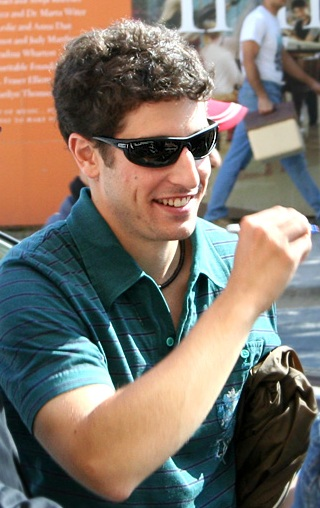
Biggs at the Toronto International Film Festival in September 2006

Biggs began acting in commercials at the age of five in 1983. In 1991, he made his television debut in the short-lived FOX series Drexell's Class.

In 1988, aged 10, he received his Screen Actors Guild card for appearing in a TV commercial for Pathmark. He later recalled in a 2015 interview in TV Guide, "I remember I had to eat a doughnut in one of the shots. Over and over again. Awesome."

When Biggs was 12, he debuted on Broadway in Conversations with My Father with Judd Hirsch. He then starred in the daytime soap opera As the World Turns, for which he was nominated for the Daytime Emmy Award for Best Younger Actor.

Biggs attended New York University briefly from 1996 to 1997, but left to pursue acting. In 1997, he appeared in a short-lived television series called Camp Stories. He starred in 1999's American Pie, which went on to become an international hit that has spawned three sequels (also starring Biggs) and five spinoffs (that did not star Biggs). He accepted starring roles in movies such as Loser in 2000, and others. He also starred (along with his Loser co-star Mena Suvari) in the music video for the song "Teenage Dirtbag" by American rock band Wheatus. In 2001, Biggs starred in the comedy Saving Silverman.

He appeared in the 2002 Broadway production of The Graduate as Benjamin Braddock alongside Kathleen Turner and Alicia Silverstone. In 2003, Biggs appeared as Jerry Falk in the Woody Allen romantic comedy Anything Else. In the 2004–2005 season, Biggs portrayed an Orthodox Jew in Daniel Goldfarb's comedy, Modern Orthodox, staged at Dodger Stages theater in New York City. In 2006, Biggs was seen in the MTV reality show Blowin' Up with Jamie Kennedy and Stu Stone which led to his participation in a hip-hop recording with Bay Area rapper E-40. Biggs returned to the stage in the fall of 2008 in Howard Korder's Boys' Life at New York City's Second Stage Theatre.

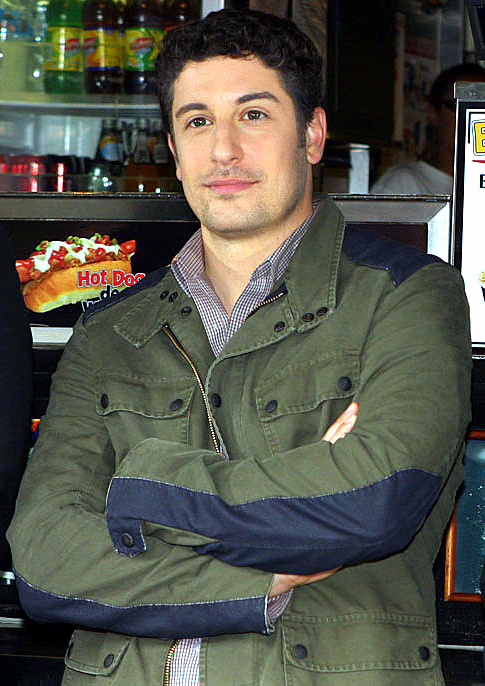
Biggs in 2012 at the American Reunion premiere in Sydney, Australia

Biggs has appeared in several other films, including Eight Below and Over Her Dead Body. In 2010, Biggs made his literary debut by contributing "Scratch-and-Sniff", a poem about growing up in New Jersey, to the anthology What's Your Exit? A Literary Detour through New Jersey (Word Riot Press, 2010). In 2012, he contributed to the anthology Oy! Only Six? Why Not More: Six-Word Memoirs on Jewish Life with the self-ironic article "This is a Roman nose, OK?" (Biggs is not Jewish.) A year later, Larry Smith, the editor of the anthology, and creator of Six-Word Memoirs, would be the basis for Biggs's Orange Is the New Black character Larry Bloom. He departed the series in February 2015 after two seasons.

Biggs reprised his role as Jim Levenstein in American Reunion, which was released on April 6, 2012. One scene in American Reunion features frontal nudity by Biggs. In the summer of 2012, Biggs took a job voicing Leonardo on Nickelodeon in Teenage Mutant Ninja Turtles. He left the series during its second season and was temporarily replaced by Dominic Catrambone. Seth Green permanently took over the role from Biggs beginning in season 3, with Leonardo's voice change being explained in the show's universe, as it was due to his throat getting injured in a battle against Shredder. Biggs also plays the cowbell in the supergroup Yukon Kornelius.

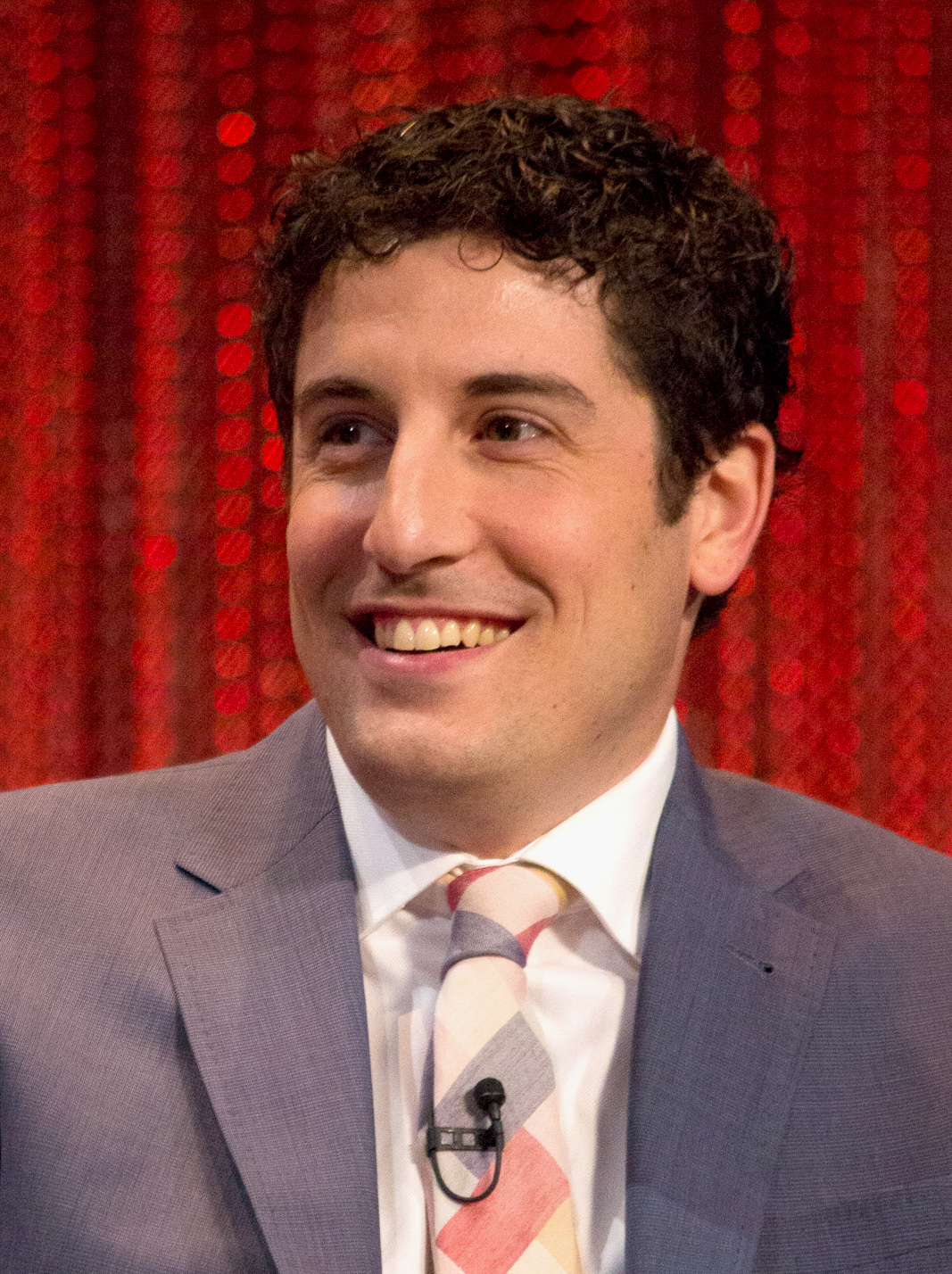
Biggs at PaleyFest 2014 panel for Orange Is the New Black

It was announced in September 2014, that Biggs would star on Broadway in The Heidi Chronicles. The play opened on March 19.

In December 2014, The Hollywood Reporter announced Biggs was cast to star in the comedy Amateur Night. Biggs plays a well-meaning expectant father who unwittingly accepts a job chauffeuring prostitutes (Janet Montgomery, Ashley Tisdale) around Los Angeles. Jenny Mollen, who is Biggs' wife in real life, appears as his wife in the film.

In 2023, Biggs starred as Rob Sanders in the Netflix Christmas-themed film Best. Christmas. Ever. alongside Brandy, Heather Graham and Matt Cedeño. He co-hosted Blue Ribbon Baking Championship on Netflix in 2024. In 2025, he made his directorial debut with the comedy thriller Untitled Home Invasion Romance, which he also starred in.

== Personal life ==
In January 2008, Biggs became engaged to his My Best Friend's Girl co-star, actress Jenny Mollen; they married on April 23, 2008. They have a son who was born on February 15, 2014. A second son was born on October 2, 2017. Biggs and Mollen sold their house in Los Angeles, California, situated near the Sunset Strip in 2015 and moved to Manhattan, New York City. As of 2017, the family resided in the West Village. In May 2026, it was reported Biggs and Mollen had separated.

From 2012 to 2014, Biggs regularly caused controversy with his posts on Twitter by making sexual jokes about Ann Romney and Janna Ryan in response to the 2012 Republican National Convention; by joking about the missing Malaysia Airlines Flight 370 in 2014; by joking about Malaysia Airlines Flight 17, which was shot down in 2014; and by mocking the death of The Bachelorette contestant Eric Hill. In a 2012 interview, Biggs stated that he has "a very fucked up sense of humor" and said he enjoyed the ability to "surprise people on a daily basis" on Twitter because his real personality is so different from those of the characters he usually plays. He apologized for and deleted his tweet about Malaysian Flight 17; in a later interview, he said that it had led to death threats against him. This led to Biggs being fired from TMNT 2012, with his final credited appearance being in the season 2 episode "The Wrath of Tiger Claw." Following his firing, Seth Green would take over from season 3 onwards.

In 2023, Biggs and his wife Mollen signed the "No Hostage Left Behind Letter", an open letter to US President Joe Biden demanding the release of all hostages from the October 7 attacks.

Biggs has Italian citizenship.

Biggs has struggled with addictions to drugs and alcohol. In 2025, he stated that he had reached seven years of sobriety.

== Filmography ==
=== Film ===
Film
Year	Title	Role	Notes
1991	Mike Mulligan and His Steam Shovel	Boy	
1991	The Boy Who Cried Bitch	Robert	
1997	Camp Stories	Abby	
1999	American Pie	Jim Levenstein	
1999	Detroit Rock City	Student/Guy in Red Track Suit	uncredited
2000	Boys and Girls	Hunter/Steve	
2000	Loser	Paul Tannek	
2001	Saving Silverman	Darren Silverman	
2001	American Pie 2	Jim Levenstein	
2001	Jay and Silent Bob Strike Back	Himself	Cameo
2001	Prozac Nation	Rafe	
2003	American Wedding	Jim Levenstein	
2003	Anything Else	Jerry Falk	
2004	Jersey Girl	Arthur Brickman	
2005	Guy X	Corporal Rudy Spruance	
2006	Farce of the Penguins	Insecure Penguin	Voice
2006	Eight Below	Charlie Cooper	
2006	Wedding Daze	Anderson	
2007	The Glitch	Alan	Short film
2008	Over Her Dead Body	Dan Sianidis	
2008	My Best Friend's Girl	Dustin	
2008	Lower Learning	Tom Willoman	
2009	Kidnapping Caitlynn	Max	Short film
2010	Remember Me	Jim Levenstein	Archive footage; uncredited
2010	The Third Rule	Don	Short film
2011	Life Happens	Sergei	
2011	Grassroots	Phil Campbell	
2012	American Reunion	Jim Levenstein	Also executive producer
2016	Amateur Night	Guy Carter	
2017	Who We Are Now	Vince	
2018	Dear Dictator	Mr. Spines	
2019	Jay and Silent Bob Reboot	Himself	
2020	The Subject	Phil Waterhouse	
2021	Woodstock 99: Peace, Love, and Rage	Himself	Documentary; Archive footage; uncredited
2023	Best. Christmas. Ever.	Rob Sanders	
2024	The 4:30 Movie	Construction Worker	
2024	Operation Taco Gary's	Himself	
2025	Untitled Home Invasion Romance	Kevin Stanwell	also director
2026	Influenced	Thief	

=== Television ===
Television
Year	Title	Role	Notes
1990	The Fotis Sevastakis Story		Television film; Unaired
1991–1992	Drexell's Class	Willie Trancas	Main role; 8 episodes
1994–1995	As the World Turns	Pete Wendall	Recurring role; 7 episodes
1997	Total Security	Robbie Rosenfeld	Main role; 13 episodes (7 unaired)
2001	The Andy Dick Show	Himself	2 episodes
2002	Off Centre	Rick Steve	Episode: "The Good, the Bad and the Lazy"
2004	Frasier	Dr. Hauck	Episode: "Goodnight, Seattle: Part 2"
2004	Sesame Street	Himself	Episode: "Baby Bear Tries to Make Curly Sleep"
2005	Will & Grace	Baby Glenn	Episode: "The Hole Truth"
2006	Blowin' Up	Himself	Episode: "The Break-Up"
2007	I'm in Hell	Nick	Television film; Also producer
2009	Happiness Isn't Everything	Jason Hamburger	CBS pilot; Also producer
2011	Mad Love	Ben Parr	Main role; 13 episodes; Also producer
2012–2014	Teenage Mutant Ninja Turtles	Leonardo / Rat Man Freak (voice)	Main role (season 1–2); Episode: "Of Rats and Men" (Rat Man Freak voice)
2012–2013	The Good Wife	Dylan Stack	2 episodes
2012	8 Out of 10 Cats	Himself	Episode: "Episode #14.2"
2013–2014; 2017; 2019	Orange Is the New Black	Larry Bloom	Main role (season 1–2), guest (season 5), recurring (season 7); 30 episodes
2014	Hollywood Game Night	Himself	Episode: "Game Night: Behind Bars"
2014	Deadbeat	Reed Kelly	Episode: "Out-Of-Body Issues"
2016	Nightcap	Himself	Episode: "Mean Guest"
2017	The Good Fight	Dylan Stack	Episode: "Chaos"
2017	Angry Angel	Himself	Television film
2018	The Wendy Williams Show	Himself (Host)	Episode: "Brian Balthazar; Jason Biggs"
2019	The Bachelorette	Himself (Guest)	Episode: "Week 3"
2020	Outmatched	Mike	Main role; 10 episodes
2020	The Masked Singer	Guest panelist	Episode: "The Playoffs: Group A"
2021	Cherries Wild	Himself (host)	Main role
2021	Jason Biggs' Cash at Your Door	Himself (host)	Main role
2022	Law & Order: Special Victims Unit	Det. Andy Parlato-Goldstein	2 episodes
2024	Blue Ribbon Baking Championship	Himself (host)	

=== Music videos ===
Music videos
Year	Title	Artist	Role
2000	"Teenage Dirtbag"	Wheatus	Paul Tannek

== Awards and nominations ==
Year	Award	Category	Nominated work	Result
1995	Daytime Emmy Awards	Outstanding Younger Actor in a Drama Series	As the World Turns	Nominated
1995	Soap Opera Digest Awards	Outstanding Male Newcomer	As the World Turns	Nominated
2000	Blockbuster Entertainment Awards	Favorite Actor – Newcomer	American Pie	Nominated
2000	MTV Movie & TV Awards	Best Comedic Performance	American Pie	Nominated
2000	MTV Movie & TV Awards	Breakthrough Male Performance	American Pie	Nominated
2000	Teen Choice Awards	Film – Choice Actor	American Pie	Nominated
2000	Teen Choice Awards	Film – Choice Chemistry	American Pie	Nominated
2000	Teen Choice Awards	Film – Wipeout Scene of the Summer	Loser	Nominated
2000	Young Hollywood Awards	Best Ensemble Cast	American Pie	Won
2002	MTV Movie & TV Awards	Best Kiss (shared with Seann William Scott)	American Pie 2	Won
2002	MTV Movie & TV Awards	Best Line	American Pie 2	Nominated
2002	Teen Choice Awards	Choice Movie Actor – Comedy	American Pie 2	Nominated
2004	Teen Choice Awards	Choice Movie Hissy Fit	American Wedding	Nominated
2004	Teen Choice Awards	Choice Movie Liplock (shared with Alyson Hannigan)	American Wedding	Nominated
2005	Taormina International Film Festival	Best Actor	Guy X	Won
2012	Teen Choice Awards	Choice Movie Actor – Comedy	American Reunion	Nominated
2014	Satellite Awards	Best Cast – Television Series	Orange is the New Black	Nominated
2015	Screen Actors Guild Awards	Outstanding Performance by an Ensemble in a Comedy Series	Orange is the New Black	Won
2020	Breckenridge Festival of Film	Best Actor	The Subject	Won
2020	San Antonio Film Festival	Best Actor	The Subject	Won
2020	Loudoun Arts Film Festival	Best Actor	The Subject	Won

== Theater ==
Theatre
Year	Title	Role	Theatre	Notes
1991–93	Conversations with My Father	Young Joey	Royale Theatre	
2002	The Graduate	Benjamin Braddock	Gerald Schoenfeld Theatre	
2004–05	Modern Orthodox		Dodger Stages Theatre	
2008	Boys' Life		Second Stage Theater	
2015	The Heidi Chronicles	Scoop Rosenbaum	Music Box Theatre	
