= Spy City =

2020 television miniseries

- Genre: Spy fiction
- Created by: William Boyd
- Written by: William Boyd
- Directed by: Miguel Alexandre
- Starring: Dominic Cooper
- Original language: English
- No. of seasons: 1
- No. of episodes: 6

Production
- Executive producers: William Boyd; Dominic Cooper; Thomas Augsberger; Bill Block; Michael Schuld; Sven Philipp; Wolfgang Feindt; Annika Schmidt
- Producers: Mischa Hofmann; Britta Meyermann; Ann-Kathrin Eicher
- Production companies: Odeon Fiction; Miramax Television

Original release
- Network: Magenta TV; AMC+
- Release: December 3, 2020

Spy City is a spy thriller television miniseries created by William Boyd about spies in 1961 Berlin, during the Cold War. The series first aired in Germany, and AMC+ picked up the rights to stream in the United States at MIPTV.

== Synopsis ==
A British spy is sent to Berlin in 1961 to uncover a mole in the United Kingdom's Embassy or among the Allies, shortly before the construction of the Berlin Wall.

== Cast and characters ==
- Dominic Cooper as Fielding Scott
- Romane Portail as Severine Bloch
- Leonie Benesch as Eliza Hahn
- Ben Münchow as Reinhart
- Johanna Wokalek as Ulrike Faber
- Seumas Sargent as Conrad Greer
- Tom Ashley as George Brotherton
- Rupert Vansittart as Ian Stuart-Hay
- Adrian Lukis as Aldous Petrie
- Tonio Arango as August Froben
- Lukáš Bech as Vasily Lubkov
- Mark Zak as Viktor Kovrin
- Gabriel Andrews as Man No. 1

== Episodes ==
| No. | Title | Directed by | Written by | Original release date |
|---|---|---|---|---|
| 1 | "Operation Beethoven" | Miguel Alexandre | William Boyd | December 3, 2020 |
In March 1960, British intelligence agent Fielding Scott narrowly evades an attempt to kill him in Berlin by an assailant whom Scott kills in self-defence. The assailant turns out to be Haldane, another British agent, and Scott is suspended from duty as a result while an investigation is carried out as to the circumstances. One year later, Scott is reinstated to duty by senior intelligence official Ian Stuart-Hay and sent back to Berlin to work under British station chief Aldous Petrie, who resents Scott's presence as Haldane had been a friend of his. Scott also reunites with Severine Bloch, a French agent and a former lover of his, and Conrad Greer, an American agent whom Scott served with during the Second World War. The three agents work on a joint operation to extract Manfred Ziegler, a German scientist working on top-secret rocket technology for the Soviets, from the Soviet-controlled East Berlin into the American sector of West Berlin. Scott liaises with Ziegler to plan his defection operation and kills a Stasi agent who caught the pair together, forcing Scott and Bloch to act quicker than planned to extract Ziegler and his family. However, they are too late and find Ziegler and his family dead in their home after a visit from Stasi agents. Meanwhile, Scott's secretary and covert Stasi spy, Eliza Hahn, comes under increasing pressure from her Stasi superiors to provide intelligence on Scott and is threatened with the arrest of her boyfriend Reinhardt if she doesn't comply.
| 2 | "Out of the Past" | Miguel Alexandre | William Boyd | December 3, 2020 |
Fielding is hunting down the traitor of the Beethoven incident, and is building himself an army for extra measure.
| 3 | "My Enemy's Enemy" | Miguel Alexandre | William Boyd | December 3, 2020 |
Fielding's time with Severine gets him blackmailed, and he goes rogue in the hopes to provoke the Soviets enough to retaliate.
| 4 | "The Flower Market" | Miguel Alexandre | William Boyd | December 3, 2020 |
The Russians are running panicked and annoyed at Fielding's actions.
| 5 | "Dark Imaginings" | Miguel Alexandre | William Boyd | December 3, 2020 |
Feeling his life is at stake, Fielding lays low, and he gets preoccupied by three urgent questions and the Beirut photograph.
| 6 | "The Wall" | Miguel Alexandre | William Boyd | December 3, 2020 |
Severine is killed and Fielding, devastated, vows to avenge her and take down the turncoat responsible, which will help solve the Berlin mysteries.

== Production ==
Spy City entered development in 2014, when Boyd created and began writing the show. It was initially planned to be a ten-episode series. In 2019, Dominic Cooper was cast in the lead role. The series was shot in Roudnice nad Labem, Plzeň, Prague in Czech Republic, from 27 August to 30 November 2019, subbing for Berlin in 1960s. The series was co-produced by H&V Entertainment GmbH, ZDF, Seven Stories (UK) and Wilma Film (Czech Republic) and was supported by FFF Bavaria, Nordmedia, German Motion Picture Fund and Czech Film Fund.

== Release ==
Originally, all episodes were released in Germany on 3 December 2020 to the Magenta TV streaming service. The series will be broadcast in Germany on ZDF in Fall 2021. ViacomCBS Global Distribution has the international distribution rights, and at MIPTV, AMC Networks purchased the rights for the United States for AMC+. AMC+ is releasing the episodes on a weekly basis starting 15 April 2021. Britbox aired the series in the UK on 23 December 2021.

== Reception ==
The review aggregation website Rotten Tomatoes reports a 70% approval rating, based on 10 reviews, with an average rating of 6.5/10. Metacritic, calculated a weighted average score of 72 out of 100 based on 7 critics, indicating "generally favorable reviews".
