= Fading Gigolo =

- Theatrical release poster
- Directed by: John Turturro
- Written by: John Turturro
- Produced by: Bill Block; Paul Hanson; Jeffrey Kusama-Hinte
- Starring: John Turturro; Woody Allen; Vanessa Paradis; Liev Schreiber; Sharon Stone; Sofia Vergara; Tonya Pinkins
- Cinematography: Marco Pontecorvo
- Edited by: Simona Paggi
- Music by: Abraham Laboriel; Bill Maxwell
- Production company: Antidote Films
- Distributed by: Millennium Entertainment
- Release dates: September 7, 2013 (TIFF); April 18, 2014 (United States)
- Running time: 90 minutes
- Country: United States
- Language: English
- Box office: $22.7 million

Fading Gigolo is a 2013 American comedy film directed, written by and starring John Turturro. The film, co-starring Woody Allen, Sharon Stone, Sofia Vergara, Vanessa Paradis, Liev Schreiber, Loan Chabanol and Eugenia Kuzmina premiered in the Special Presentation section at the 2013 Toronto International Film Festival. It was given a limited release on April 18, 2014, and received mixed reviews.

== Plot ==
Dr. Parker, a wealthy dermatologist, mentions to her patient Murray Schwartz that she and a woman friend, Selima, wish to experience a ménage à trois and asks if he knows a willing man. Murray, whose used bookstore has failed as a business, convinces his friend and former employee Fioravante to take the gig, as both are short of money. Soon, they build a thriving gigolo trade with Murray as the pimp. Murray lives with Othella and her children, one of whom gets head lice. Murray takes the boy to Avigal, the attractive widow of a Hasidic rabbi, for treatment.

Murray tells Avigal about Fioravante, claiming he's a massage healer who can help her, before taking her to see him. Being too religiously observant to even shake hands with him, she nonetheless allows Fioravante to massage her back. That touch, the first in two years since the passing of her husband, brings her to tears. Meanwhile, Dovi, who works for Shomrim, a Williamsburg, Brooklyn neighborhood patrol, becomes suspicious and follows Murray. Dovi is in love with Avigal, but she does not encourage him. Fioravante and Avigal meet several more times, culminating in a kiss in the park.

Fioravante is summoned to the long planned ménage, but he's unable to finish it. The two women cheerfully realize the truth—he has fallen in love. Murray is kidnapped by a group of Hasids, taken to a Rabbinic Court and interrogated. Avigal interrupts the court and confesses to violating the laws of modesty, but nothing more, explaining she was lonely. Avigal now accepts Dovi, but has him drive her to Fioravante to say goodbye. Fioravante tells Murray he is leaving, though he reconsiders after a café encounter with another beautiful woman.

== Cast ==
- John Turturro as Fioravante
- Woody Allen as Murray Schwartz
- Sharon Stone as Dr. Parker
- Sofía Vergara as Selima
- Vanessa Paradis as Avigal
- Liev Schreiber as Dovi
- Eugenia Kuzmina as Olga
- Tonya Pinkins as Othella
- Max Casella as guy at counter
- Aida Turturro as driver's wife
- Bob Balaban as Sol
- Michael Badalucco as burly driver
- David Margulies as Chief Rebbe
- Aurélie Claudel as tai chi woman
- Loan Chabanol as Loan

== Release ==
Fading Gigolo screened in the Special Presentation section at the 2013 Toronto International Film Festival on September 8, 2013. It received a limited release in the United States on April 18, 2014.

== Reception ==
=== Critical response ===
Fading Gigolo received mixed reviews. On film aggregation website Rotten Tomatoes, the film has a 55% approval rating, with an average score of 5.85/10, based on reviews from 143 critics. The website's critical consensus states: "Admittedly vulgar and ludicrous, Fading Gigolo gets a surprising amount of mileage out of the entertaining chemistry between its starring duo". On another website, Metacritic, it has a weighted average score of 58 out of 100, based on reviews from 38 critics, indicating "mixed or average" reviews.

Geoffrey Macnab of The Independent gave the film three out of five stars, noting that "Turturro's trick is to take stereotypical characters and to portray them in an offbeat and surprising way." Peter Debruge of Variety gave it a favorable review. "It certainly benefits from having Allen aboard, though only Turturro would fight to bring such a warm and disarming experiment to the screen", he said.

Catherine Shoard of The Guardian praised Woody Allen's performance, stating that "Turturro has given Allen his biggest and best on-screen turn in years". Stephanie Zacharek of The Village Voice called the film "a breeze, enjoyable both for its sweetness and its unapologetic silliness".

=== Box Office ===
The movie grossed $3,769,873 domestically and $18,936,431 in other territories giving a total gross of $22,706,304.
