= Dirty Grandpa =

2016 film by Dan Mazer

- Theatrical release poster
- Directed by: Dan Mazer
- Written by: John M. Phillips
- Produced by: Barry Josephson; Bill Block; Michael Simkin; Jason Barrett
- Starring: Robert De Niro; Zac Efron; Aubrey Plaza; Zoey Deutch; Julianne Hough; Dermot Mulroney
- Cinematography: Eric Alan Edwards
- Edited by: Anne McCabe
- Music by: Michael Andrews
- Production companies: BillBlock Media; Josephson Entertainment; QED International
- Distributed by: Lionsgate
- Release date: January 22, 2016 (United States)
- Running time: 102 minutes
- Country: United States
- Language: English
- Budget: $11.5 million
- Box office: $105.1 million

Dirty Grandpa is a 2016 American comedy film about a lawyer who drives his grandfather to Florida during spring break. The film was directed by Dan Mazer and written by John Phillips. It stars Robert De Niro and Zac Efron in the leading roles, with Aubrey Plaza, Zoey Deutch, Julianne Hough and Dermot Mulroney in supporting roles.

It was filmed on location in Atlanta from January 19 to May 9, 2015.

The film was theatrically released on January 22, 2016, by Lionsgate. It grossed $105 million worldwide, and received negative reviews from critics, with several calling it to be one of the worst movies of all time.

== Plot ==
Jason Kelly is a corporate lawyer in Atlanta who works for his father's law firm. When Jason's paternal grandmother dies, his U.S. Army veteran paternal grandfather, Lt. Col. Richard "Dick" Kelly, asks him to drive him to Boca Raton, Florida, because his driver's license is suspended. Jason is marrying his controlling fiancée Meredith in one week but, despite his apprehension, agrees to take his grandfather.

At a roadside diner they meet Jason's old photography classmate, Shadia, along with her friends Lenore and Bradley. After learning that Lenore wants to have sex with a college professor, Dick tells them that he is a university professor and that Jason is a photographer for Time. They initially go their separate ways, but Dick convinces Jason that they should meet the girls at Daytona Beach as Dick wants to have sex with Lenore. The two go to a golf course, where Dick flirts with two women much to Jason's annoyance.

At Daytona, they meet up with the girls and their friends, Cody and Brah, with whom they compete in beer chugging. Dick secretly slips Xanax into Jason's beer. That night, a drunk Jason, wearing nothing but a hornet fanny pack, parties and accidentally smokes crack cocaine from drug dealer Pam. He steals a motorcycle and wakes up the next day on the beach.

During an awkward FaceTime session with Meredith and his family, a toddler grabs the fanny pack and takes it off; the boy's father calls the police who promptly arrest Jason. Dick bails him out, and Jason attempts to leave Dick with his old Army friend Stinky in a nursing home. But they learn he is dying, Dick persuades Jason to stay in Daytona until he is able to sleep with Lenore.

They enter into a muscle flexing contest with Cody and Brah; but Jason quits out of fear of being photographed. Dick alters a T-shirt cannon to fire a beer at Cody and Brah, hospitalizing them. After Dick reveals to Jason that he was a Green Beret, they go to a nightclub with the girls. Dick gets into a fight with some men after they bully Bradley for his homosexuality. The next day, Jason bonds with Shadia and she tells him that she is going to live on a ship for a year.

That night, the group does karaoke with the men from the night before. After singing a duet, Jason realizes he has feelings for Shadia and plans on telling her the truth, but before he can, Cody does an online search using information he saw on Dick's (still valid) driver's license, and tells Shadia that Jason is already engaged.

Jason then gets caught with drugs which were planted by Cody and Brah, and is thrown into jail again. The next day, Dick bails him out and tells Jason that his real reason for the trip was to convince Jason not to go through with the wedding. A disgusted and furious Jason leaves Dick and drives back home.

During his wedding rehearsal, Dick hacks into the computer system, revealing embarrassing photos of Jason. Jason says that he cannot marry Meredith, who reveals that she had an affair with his cousin, though Jason does not hear this information due to poor acoustics; his cousin instead quickly telling him that Meredith has told him to do what he wants to do.

Jason, Dick, and Pam, with David (Dick's son and Jason's father), use Pam's ice cream truck to catch up with the bus that Shadia is on as she is leaving. Jason and Shadia kiss, and he gets on the bus with her, while David and Dick, previously estranged, reconnect. Dick goes to his house in Boca Raton and finds Lenore there waiting for him, and they have sex. Dick and Lenore get married and have a baby boy named Richard Jr., and Jason and Shadia are named the godparents.

== Cast ==
- Robert De Niro as a retired U.S. Army veteran Lt. Col. Richard "Dick" Kelly, Jason's widowed paternal grandfather and David's father
- Zac Efron as Jason Kelly, David's son and Dick's grandson
- Zoey Deutch as Shadia, Jason's old photography classmate, Lenore's best friend and one of Bradley's two friends
- Aubrey Plaza as Lenore, Shadia's best friend and one of Bradley's two friends
- Julianne Hough as Meredith Goldstein, Jason's domineering fiancée
- Dermot Mulroney as David Kelly, Jason's father and Dick's son
- Jason Mantzoukas as Pam
- Jeffrey Bowyer-Chapman as Bradley, Shadia and Lenore's effeminate, gay male friend
- Jake Picking as Cody
- Michael Hudson as Brah
- Adam Pally as Nick
- Henry Zebrowski as Officer Gary Reiter
- Mo Collins as Officer Jean Finch
- Danny Glover as "Stinky", Dick's old army friend
- Brandon Mychal Smith as Tyrone

== Production ==
The film's script was featured in the 2011 edition of the Black List, an annual listing of well received but unproduced scripts in circulation. Prior to De Niro's casting, Jeff Bridges and Michael Douglas were considered for the starring role.

De Niro's casting along with that of Zac Efron was confirmed September 2014. Zoey Deutch joined as the female lead, followed that January by the casting of Adam Pally and Aubrey Plaza. Plaza said that she was inspired by the role because it was different from the characters she normally played, and was also inspired by the fact that the role let her engage in physical comedy.

=== Filming ===
Principal photography began in Atlanta, Georgia on January 5, 2015. On February 4, filming took place in McDonough. On February 9–10, filming took place at The Grand Atrium at 200 Peachtree in Atlanta. Preliminary shooting of the film ended on February 13, 2015, in Hampton, Georgia.

After filming officially ended, it was again scheduled to resume from April 27 to May 5, with the cast and crew filming spring break scenes on Tybee Island, Georgia. On April 27, filming resumed, with Efron preparing for his scenes. Production officially ended on May 9, 2015.

== Release ==
On October 29, 2015, Lionsgate released the film's first poster and trailer. The first poster was a parody of the poster for Mike Nichols' 1967 film The Graduate.

The film was initially set for a Christmas 2015 release, but was pushed to an August 12, 2016, date. It was then brought up to February 26, 2016, before finally being moved to January 22, 2016.

=== Home media ===
Dirty Grandpa received a DVD and Blu-ray release on May 17, 2016. The Blu-ray edition featured an unrated version of the film, including an audio commentary, a making-of, a gag reel, and three featurettes. It was released on 4K UHD Blu-Ray on June 12, 2018.

== Reception ==
=== Box office ===
Dirty Grandpa grossed $35.6 million in the United States and Canada and $69.5 million in other territories for a worldwide total of $105.1 million, against a production budget of $11.5 million.

The film was released in North America on January 22, 2016, alongside The 5th Wave and The Boy, and was projected to gross $10–13 million from 2,912 theaters in its opening weekend. The film made $4.3 million on its first day and went on to debut to $11.1 million, finishing 6th at the box office.

=== Critical response ===
On the review aggregator website Rotten Tomatoes, 10% of 134 critics' reviews are positive, with an average rating of 3.1/10. The website's consensus reads: "Like a Werther's Original dropped down a sewer drain, Dirty Grandpa represents the careless fumbling of a classic talent that once brought pleasure to millions." Metacritic, which uses a weighted average, assigned the film a score of 21 out of 100, based on 27 critics, indicating "generally unfavorable" reviews. Audiences polled by CinemaScore gave the film an average grade of "B" on an A+ to F scale.

Dirty Grandpa received negative reviews for its gross-out and shock humor. Frank Scheck of The Hollywood Reporter said that even though humor is subjective, "It can be definitively stated that Dirty Grandpa is utterly unfunny." Scheck was especially critical of the uneven tone of the film, and says it "doesn't even have the courage of its anarchic convictions, frequently abandoning its tasteless humor to indulge in sentimental scenes". Nick Schager of Variety wrote: "This contemptible fiasco is not only comfortable courting laughs through ugly mockery of minorities, but also doesn't even have the courage of its own crass-as-I-wannabe convictions." Mike Ryan of Uproxx said: "Dirty Grandpa is the worst movie I've ever seen in a movie theater. Burn it." He later also picked it as the worst film he had both reviewed and seen. Pete Hammond of Deadline Hollywood said: "Dirty Grandpa, is not just the worst movie [De Niro] has ever been in, but it may be the worst movie anyone has ever been in." Glenn McDonald of Indy Week said: "The awful, ugly Dirty Grandpa is the comedy equivalent of torture porn ... In fact, in the dizzying moments after being bludgeoned by this miserable specimen, I was convinced it's among the worst movies ever made." Richard Roeper of the Chicago Sun-Times gave the film zero stars, and wrote: "If Dirty Grandpa isn't the worst movie of 2016, I have some serious cinematic torture in my near future."

Mark Kermode, on his BBC Radio 5 Live show, said, "after Dirty Grandpa I did feel genuinely unclean. I wanted to go and have a shower because it's just so revolting. Somewhere in hell there is a multiplex playing this on a double bill with Movie 43 and Entourage." He would later go on to brand it his least favorite film of 2016. Glenn Kenny of RogerEbert.com said: "The actor Bela Lugosi appeared in some landmark, perhaps even great, films at the beginning of his Hollywood career in the 1930s. ... Lugosi's final film was 1959's 'Plan 9 From Outer Space,' frequently cited as the worst film ever made. The cinematic landmarks of De Niro's career include films such as [Francis Ford] Coppola's The Godfather, Part II [sic] and Scorsese's Raging Bull. He has been featured in a good number of very bad films in the years since. But this? This might just be his own 'Plan 9.'"

Jesse Hassenger of The A.V. Club gave the film a C− grade, calling it "tired" and criticizing the writing and direction. However, Hassenger was positive about Plaza's performance, calling her the funniest part of the film and saying that "she and De Niro appear ready to run away together into a better movie". He concluded that "There's a certain perverse brilliance, however accidental, to a movie that creates a longing for a foulmouthed Aubrey Plaza/Robert De Niro romcom." Kate Taylor of The Globe and Mail gave the film 2 out of 4 and wrote: "It's the direction, not the script, that really kills the picture, as Mazer limps along from the chugging contest to the half-naked conga line to the car chase without ever raising the laughs he needs from the comic set pieces or the tension he needs from the dramatic developments." Taylor says the film is not sweet enough, or raunchy enough, and "seems unlikely to satisfy any audience" and concludes that De Niro's fans will be left pleading for better. Peter Bradshaw of The Guardian gave the film 2 out of 5, and said it offered "Some laughs – and some unintentional eeeuuuwwws." Bradshaw wrote: "This grossout comedy takes De Niro fans into a new emotional phase that I can only call 'post-despair'. We are past being astonished and horrified. ... We are just numbly resigned to the great man continuing to do things like this".

=== Accolades ===
At the 37th Golden Raspberry Awards, it received five nominations, for Worst Picture, Worst Actor (De Niro), Worst Supporting Actress (Julianne Hough and Aubrey Plaza) and Worst Screenplay, but did not win in any category.

Award	Category	Subject	Result
Golden Raspberry Awards	Worst Picture	Bill Block	Nominated
Golden Raspberry Awards	Worst Picture	Michael Simkin	Nominated
Golden Raspberry Awards	Worst Picture	Jason Barrett	Nominated
Golden Raspberry Awards	Worst Picture	Barry Josephson	Nominated
Golden Raspberry Awards	Worst Actor	Robert De Niro	Nominated
Golden Raspberry Awards	Worst Supporting Actress	Julianne Hough	Nominated
Golden Raspberry Awards	Worst Supporting Actress	Aubrey Plaza	Nominated
Golden Raspberry Awards	Worst Screenplay	John M. Phillips	Nominated

== See also ==
- List of 21st-century films considered the worst
