= List of As Told by Ginger characters =

Throughout the various episodes in As Told by Ginger, a number of recurring characters appear. Prominent characters are listed here.

== The Foutleys ==
=== Ginger Foutley ===
Voiced by Melissa Disney

Ginger Foutley is an average 12-year-old girl, ginger haired and the titular main protagonist in the series. She was not considered "popular" until Courtney Gripling, the stereotypical "school diva", decided to befriend her. Through Ginger, Courtney is able to view how the world works outside of the popular clique. However, Courtney's "right-hand woman", Miranda Killgallen, becomes increasingly jealous of Courtney and Ginger's relationship, and stops at nothing to relegate Ginger to her previous role of geek. Aside from Courtney, Ginger has a group of loyal friends (Dodie Bishop and Macie Lightfoot), who are nearly always ready to back her up.

At home, Ginger's mother Lois, a nurse, attempts to give Ginger advice for the majority of her situations, but, as Ginger is often seen too embarrassed to listen to her mother's reasoning, she ends up learning from her own mistakes much of the time.

Ginger's younger brother, fourth-grader Carl, often attempts to use Ginger as a test subject for his experiments and twisted schemes. However, he has tried this so much that Ginger can usually tell that he is up to something suspicious, and refuses to comply.

Early on in the series, Ginger did not know much about her father, who left the family shortly after Carl was born. In Hello Stranger, she invited him to her poetry reading at school. Although he did not respond to the invitation, Ginger was convinced he would show anyway, and thus, was devastated when he didn't. In An "Even-Steven" Holiday Special (the title of which refers to Ginger being torn between how to celebrate Christmas and Chanukah at the same time after learning that she is one-quarter Jewish), Jonas returns to the family briefly after seeing Carl playing Santa Claus on the street. Though never having officially found his way back into the family, Jonas became more of an installation in the show, appearing at various intervals to give Ginger his fatherly advice to her.

As an excellent student, Ginger is a very talented writer, particularly gifted at writing poetry. "Hello Stranger" shows that she also has a talent for spoken word. In The "A" Ticket, her crush, Ian Richton, was paired up with her as a lab partner, but used her to get an A so he could stay on the soccer team, much to Ginger's chagrin. Ginger is the favorite student of her English teacher, Ms. Zorski, due to her impressive writing skills. Ginger once wrote a poem entitled "And Then She Was Gone" (in the episode And She Was Gone), to Ms. Zorski's concern, who subsequently sent Ginger to the school counselor. Her talent for writing is expounded on in the series finale, when we are shown that Ginger has become a successful author later in life.

Ginger's love life was rather catastrophic throughout the course of the show. Initially, she harbored a big crush on Ian Richton, which presumably ended when she discovered he was only using her to get an A in science. Another notable relationship that Ginger has had is with Sasha, a boy she met at summer camp. She left camp on good terms with Sasha, but when she visited him at his school in Ginger's Solo, he tells her he has a girlfriend. Her relationship with good friend and neighbor Darren Patterson was incredibly tumultuous and underwent much change during the series. In Dare I, Darren? Ginger began to look at Darren in a more romantic light following Miranda's suggestion that they (Ginger and Darren) would make a good couple. Later on, in the episode Never Can Say Goodbye, she develops a physical attraction to Darren after he gets his headgear removed. Despite attempts to deny these newfound feelings, Ginger becomes incredibly jealous when Darren and Miranda begin to date. Finally, in Foutley's on Ice (Part 3), Ginger and Darren become an official couple. However, when they reach high school, Darren soon takes interest in a cheerleader named Simone. Darren then cheats on Ginger, leaving her heartbroken. She then develops acute appendicitis and has to go to the hospital. She then finds much comfort in a new friend, Orion. She and Orion never have an official relationship, but more of a flirtatious friendship. Though in the series finale, The Wedding Frame (Part 3), Ginger "takes the leap" and is shown with Orion at her mother's wedding.

However, at the end of the episode, when Ginger's future is shown, she not only is wearing a wedding (or perhaps engagement) ring, but is shown with Darren, who is holding a baby girl that looks rather like Ginger.

=== Carl Foutley ===
Voiced by Jeannie Elias

Carl Foutley is Ginger's younger brother, who is 9 years old and in the fourth grade in the first season. He and his sidekick, "Hoodsey" Bishop, come up with their own schemes and perform their experiments in an abandoned doghouse in the Foutleys' backyard. The doghouse once belonged to the Foutleys' dog Monster, who ran away many years prior to the beginning of the series. In the series finale, Monster returns to the Foutleys. Because of his unique, yet very disturbing personality, his family sometimes act like they don't like him, and often criticize him a lot.

Courtney Gripling's younger brother, Blake, is often the recipient of Carl's bad humor, due to the repeated theft of a petrified eyeball that initially belonged to Carl. Blake can usually be seen trying to get on Carl's good side, but Carl refuses his advances and takes every opportunity to humiliate Blake.

Carl's catch phrase is "classified." He is incredibly secretive about his plans, revealing as little as possible about them to anyone who may inquire, even if he needs outside help acquiring the necessary materials to carry them out, of which include catching a naked mole-rat, turning himself into a wolf, and attempting to stay on a ski lift for 16 hours.

Despite his love of extremely gross and unusual things, Carl's also got a big heart, as shown on several occasions; delivering a beautiful eulogy at Maude's funeral ("Carl & Maude"), and even openly crying after hearing about Mrs. Gordon's untimely passing hours after he'd tried to get her to return. In "Fast Reputation", it was revealed that Carl is a great cook. Joann Bishop (Dodie and Hoodsey's mother and whom he calls Jojo) does not like Carl at all and often speaks very ill of him, despite his usual attempts to be nice to her.

Carl's one true love is Noelle Sussman. Originally, Noelle was viewed by Carl as a nobody on whom he could test his "disappearing powder", as he felt that she was expendable and would not be missed. As he studies the progress of his experiments, however, he realizes what a truly weird girl Noelle is, and that he misses her, leading the two to develop a relationship in And She Was Gone.

The series finale shows Carl and Hoodsey becoming popular TV reporters. They are also among the group at a later reading of Ginger's latest book.

=== Lois Foutley ===
Voiced by Laraine Newman

Lois "Lola" Foutley is Ginger and Carl's mother. She is supposedly 31 years old, but this is likely a lie; she's most likely around 40 years old, assuming that she's close in age to Dr. Dave. Lois is also a nurse. She seems to be very fond of celery in the later episodes, and can often be seen munching away. Although she is a nurturing mother to Ginger and Carl, she is also something of a strict disciplinarian, and does not hesitate to put her foot down when she feels it is necessary; for example, in Kiss and Make-up, Ginger, Dodie, and Macie create their own make-up using crayons, pudding, and other household ingredients. Lois does not allow Ginger to wear makeup because she believes Ginger is too young for it. When she finds out Ginger disobeyed her and wore makeup for her school photo, she becomes furious and subsequently grounds Ginger "indefinitely" without hearing her reasoning. However, with Carl, Lois seems to have adopted a "don't ask, don't tell" philosophy. In episode 23, it is revealed that Lois has a strange fear of accountants (although mentioned in passing and never brushed up upon again). Within the same episode, you can hear her mutter to herself her wish of the demise of all pygmy elephants. Although it has been debatable among fans. Often, leaving many fans to review the episode over to try and catch it. She drives an old blue Volkswagen Beetle, which has an engine fire in the episode TGIF. In "TGIF" Buzz was urging her that she has to immediately contact professional help to deal with the mold in the Foutley House.

Before the beginning of the series, Lois was married to Jonas Foutley, who left her shortly after Carl's birth. Lois' love life remained dormant until Ms. Foutley's Boys, when she and Buzz (the plumber who fixed the Foutleys' mold problem in TGIF), develop a flirtatious relationship, later leading to Buzz and his three sons moving into the Foutley house, and becoming an annoyance by giving everything "a man's touch". Buzz continually uses the excuse "boys will be boys" to justify his sons' conduct as well as his own, eventually leading Lois to break up with him.

A while after this, she then began seeing a coworker from the hospital, Dr. David Dave. He proposed to her in About Face and they were married in the series finale, The Wedding Frame. After accepting Dr. Dave's marriage proposal, in Butterflies Are Free Part One, she decides to diet and exercise to get prepared for the wedding ahead of time, In Part Two, she has succeeded her goal, which had made a first impression on Ginger, who graduates middle school. Lois and Dave are last seen many years later attending a reading of Ginger's latest book.

It is worth noting that Lois kept Jonas' last name although they had presumably been divorced for somewhere around ten years (assuming Jonas left before Carl was only a year old and considering Carl is in fourth grade, which would make him nine or ten years old) at the series' beginning.

=== Jonas Foutley ===
Voiced by Tom Virtue

Jonas Foutley is Ginger and Carl's biological father, who abandoned them and Lois sometime after Carl was born. Ginger never had any fond or, for that matter, clear memories of her father, and all the photographs of him that are in her possession are of his feet.

In Hello Stranger, Jonas is 37 years old, and he lives in an apartment. Although he never returns Ginger's call, she convinces herself that he will show up at her reading. Lois, however, rightly believes that he will not appear. Lois is at work at the time of Ginger's performance, and has sunflowers sent to the school with a card signed "Dad", but Ginger realizes that actually Lois sent the flowers and her father just let her down.

In An "Even Steven" Holiday Special, Jonas is shown performing as Santa Claus, standing on the street corner, collecting money, and happens to come across Carl and Hoodsey. Hoodsey believes that Jonas is really Santa Claus, and confides in him that Carl does not believe in Santa, because Santa has never granted him his only wish (to have his father home for Christmas). After hearing this, Jonas decides to pay the Foutleys a visit, which somewhat improved his relationship with his children.

Though Jonas never really becomes a fixture in the family, he appears sometimes to bequeath fatherly advice to Ginger, and to teach her about the extended family from which she is descended. Carl, however, is still quite bitter towards his dad for abandoning him and largely limits his contact with him.

Jonas is described as an "animal lover" and has a pet dog named Ben.

=== Dr. David Dave ===
Voiced by David Jeremiah

Dr. David Dave is 40 years old. Although not an official Foutley, Dr. Dave and Lois were married in the series finale. He had worked very closely with Lois at the hospital since the beginning of the series. Over the course of the show, there were numerous hints of him having a crush on Lois. He proposed in About Face. His mother, who is 64 years old, does not approve of their relationship and in The Wedding Frame hired someone to sabotage it, but was stopped and the wedding went on as planned. He and Lois are last seen years later at a reading of his stepdaughter Ginger's latest book.

== The Bishops ==
=== Dodie Bishop ===
Voiced by Aspen Vincent

Deirdre Hortense "Dodie" Bishop, 12 years old, along with Macie Lightfoot, makes up Ginger's inner circle of good friends. Dodie is known for her big mouth and her great love of gossip; she is often seen updating Ginger on the latest happenings with the popular group or on modern romance. She appears to be very needy and wants nothing more than to be popular, often doing unscrupulous things in order to achieve a high social status. For example, in the episode Dodie's Big Break, she feigned a broken leg in order to win a much-coveted spot on the cheerleading squad, but her ruse was uncovered by Ginger and Macie. Usually, however, whenever she believes she is on the verge of becoming popular, she becomes somewhat corrupt and dishonest and almost always ends up back where she started. While it is very difficult for her to realize when her ploys for popularity, acceptance and sometimes manipulation have gone a little too far, she will do all she can to apologize and repair the damage done as soon as she realizes what she's done. It is also noted that while she occasionally succumbs to the lure of being popular on her own, she usually wants her best friends included in her schemes: she is at core a loyal friend and will usually stop herself short of harming Ginger and Macie. At the series' beginning, Courtney Gripling referred to her as "Potie" and hardly acknowledged her existence. However, as Courtney grows much closer to Ginger, she ends up growing closer to Dodie, as well.

In Of Lice & Friends, Dodie becomes the school announcer. Concerned with the dullness of the announcements, Dodie begins to intersperse school information with interesting tidbits of gossip. This turns the morning announcements into a much-anticipated event and also makes her the talk of popular kids as she somehow knows things that even Miranda Killgallen admits not knowing. Pressured to keep her announcements interesting and running out of news, Dodie finds the list of kids who have lice and decides to read it over the loudspeaker when she discovers Courtney's name on it. Ginger manages to stop her before she gets to Courtney's name, and while briefly angry at her friend, Dodie soon understands she's gotten carried away by the popularity and resigns.

She is the daughter of Joann and David Charles Bishop; Joann appears to be the source of Dodie's ruthless and deceitful nature, as Robert explained to his daughter that, as a teenager, Joann was the very same as Dodie: desperate for popularity but always falling short of it. She is however far less judgmental and controlling than her mother, perhaps thanks to influence from her mild, timid father and his much sharper perception of the word.

Dodie is very close to her best friends and can react very strongly when she feels she might lose her place in their hearts to someone else. She has even been resentful of the otherwise idolized Courtney Gripling, becoming quite jealous when she invites Ginger to participate in social events such as birthday parties or sleepovers, or when she believes Ginger is much closer to Courtney than she is to her, like when they are seen seemingly sharing secrets during a fire drill (though in this case, her fears are actively stoked by Miranda). This jealousy also reared its head when Darren and Ginger first became a couple and became somewhat absorbed in each other, leading her and Macie to attempt to split them up. When the plan was discovered and Ginger ceased to talk to them for a while, Dodie was consumed with lots of guilt and can be heard leaving an apology in Ginger's answering machine.

When she enters high school, Dodie attempts to become a cheerleader, but is relegated to the position of equipment manager. She matures, becoming slightly more careful in her approach to social situations and gossip: when she catches wind of her friend's boyfriend Darren being attracted to cheerleader Simone, she writes him a lengthy letter, telling him that she will not run to Ginger with the information but advising him to take care of the situation in the best way he can before someone gets hurt.

At the end of the series finale, Dodie is shown married to her boyfriend, Chet Zipper, with whom she has a baby daughter that looks like Dodie.

=== Robert Joseph 'Hoodsey' Bishop ===
Voiced by Tress MacNeille

Hoodsey Joseph Bishop is Dodie's younger brother, he is 9 years old, and Carl Foutley's best friend and sidekick. He is extremely gullible and believes anything someone tells him. He usually never has supplementary ideas for Carl's plots, but is typically more than happy to help. He is called "Hoodsey" due to the fact that he never wears anything but a purple hooded sweatshirt, and his closet has many of them.

Hoodsey is a complete mama's boy, and is always repeating things his mother tells him. He usually uses his mother's advice in an attempt to make Carl stop his scheming, typically to no avail.

In the series finale, Hoodsey is shown, along with Carl, as a popular TV reporter, and they are both seen amongst the group at a reading of Ginger's latest book. He is also shown that he has a wedding ring on his finger.

=== Joann Bishop ===
Voiced by Susan Krebs

Joann Bishop is Dodie and Hoodsey's mother and is an extremely irritable and bad tempered woman. She seems to be deeply critical and disapproving of Hoodsey's friendship with Carl Foutley very much, and also seems to just barely tolerate Lois Foutley as Lois does the same. Despite this, she has no problem with Dodie and Ginger's friendship as she considers Ginger to be a very good influence on her daughter.

Much to Dodie's horror, Joann lands a substitute teaching job at Dodie's school for Home Economics in the episode About Face. However, this only appears to be an attempt to reinvent her youth, as she does her best to get Courtney's group to accept her by pathetically adopting outdated and exaggerated teenage mannerisms, and giving herself the alias of "Josie." Dodie initially assumes that Joann was the equivalent of Courtney during her teens, but later finds out that in middle school, Joann was pretty much like Dodie herself: needy, dishonest and desperate to be popular. Joann's picture in her middle school yearbook reads, "Missed Popularity" whilst her classmate, the true Josie MacDonald, was voted "Miss. Popularity." According to her husband, Joann also turned to deceitful tactics to achieve popularity; a trait which she appears to have passed on to her daughter. Joann later showed remorse for her actions and encouraged her daughter to accept herself for who she was, lest she barely found any happiness. Joann is portrayed as very neurotic, strict and serious, and something of a control freak. She insists on calling Dodie and Hoodsey by their real names, and strongly dislikes being referred to as "JoJo".

=== Dave Bishop ===
Voiced by John Astin (season 1) and Dan Castellaneta (seasons 2-3)

David Charles "Dave" Bishop is Dodie and Hoodsey's father. He almost always appears to be very lazy sitting on the couch, though an important enough cause (such as a death in the family) will raise him. He is much calmer than his wife and much more accepting of Carl as Hoodsey's friend. He is a loving and affectionate father, and worries a great deal about his children's happiness. In the episode About Face, he urged his children to accept themselves for who they are, for fear they end up as unhappy as their mother, who had spent her entire youth as an obnoxious social climber trying to get people to like her and ended up with nothing. He and Hoodsey watch The Weather Channel together and he is a big fan of game shows. He has a definite resemblance to Hoodsey, almost looking like an older, fatter Hoodsey with glasses.

== The Lightfoots ==
=== Macie Lightfoot ===
Voiced by Jackie Harris

Ginger's other best friend is Macie, she is 12 years old. Macie is in a constant state of panic, as she is allergic to almost everything and fears change. She is portrayed as the "geekiest" one of the group, and is very knowledgeable. She is incredibly childish, most likely due to her parents not being there to help her through the various stages of adolescence. It is implied that they were very attentive to her when she was younger. She also possesses quite an array of knowledge on a great variation of subjects.

In Come Back Little Seal Girl, Macie, Dodie, and Ginger agree on doing a skit devoted to The Little Seal Girl, their childhood heroine, for their school talent show. They will do it together, as per their Best Friends Tradition. When Dodie and Ginger back out because Miranda and Courtney have ridiculed their skit as juvenile, Macie goes solo, stating that her friends are betraying her and the Seal Girl, whom they've lived by for their whole lives. Despite the skepticism of everyone and more than a few things going wrong during the skit (such as the tape recording she was performing to malfunctioning in the middle of her routine), Macie ends up winning the talent show. Dodie and Ginger congratulate her after the show, and the trio is reconciled.

In Family Therapy, Macie is crushed by her parents forgetting her thirteenth birthday. Consumed with guilt, they buy her a swingset: they've been absent from Macie's life for so long, they're unaware of her real age and what is appropriate for her. They proceed to catch up with Macie in this fashion, taking her to parks, kiddie restaurants, and generally treating her like a little four-year-old girl, much to Ginger's horror and Macie's delight. This becomes a bone of contention between the two friends, with Ginger worrying that Macie might lose herself in the charade and Macie eager to bask in her parents' attention once more, leading Macie to openly reject her friend's well-intentioned meddling. Despite Ginger's fears, Macie is shown to have had a firm grip on reality all along, and after commenting that reliving her childhood has been great, assures her friends that she'll tell her parents she is thirteen.

Macie already knew Dodie from before when they both barely met Ginger in second grade, and at the start of junior high, it seems that Macie would have been happy keeping things as they were, not being too eager to grow up. Her birthday is April 22.

She is last seen in the series finale as part of the group that has turned out for Ginger's book reading.

=== Robert "Bobby" and Roberta "Bobbie" Lightfoot ===
Voiced by Michael McKean (Bobby) and Mary Gross (Bobbie)

Macie's father is Bobby Lightfoot, Ph.D., and her mother is Bobbie Lightfoot, Ph.D. They are both psychologists and portray the stereotypical new age parents. However, they are also both incredibly absent-minded, forgetting Macie's thirteenth birthday and making up for it by treating her ten years younger than she actually was.

== The Pattersons ==
=== Darren Patterson ===
Voiced by Bradley Pierce (pilot); Kenny Blank (series)

Ginger's long-time friend and next door neighbor Darren Patterson, he is 13 years old, is another member of Ginger's inner circle of friends. He is very calm, reliable and down to earth. Although he is not truly a geek, Darren's unwieldy orthodontia was a serious strain on his popularity. His other main issue is that his brother Will and his father, both loud, tough and into sports, think he's way too soft. All this began to change, however, when he got his headgear off and instantly became attractive and popular.

He briefly dated Miranda Killgallen and, at one time, thought Courtney was interested in him, both times putting Ginger in an awkward position. He declares his love for Ginger when she moves away in Far From Home, after which they became a couple. After their relationship suffers some trouble, Darren leaves Ginger for an older cheerleader named Simone (whom he was seeing behind her back). This hurts Ginger in such a way that she decides to cut him out of her life entirely.

As of the series finale, Darren and Simone are still dating but when seeing Ginger and Orion together he looks visibly upset and uncomfortable. However, in a sneak peek into the future reveals that Ginger and Darren get married and have a child.

=== Will Patterson ===
Voiced by Guy Torry

Darren's older brother, who is 16 years old, a high school junior, licensed driver, and main tormentor Will Patterson has the complete opposite school status as his brother does. He is one of the most popular kids at the high school. He has a group of girls that follow him around school and is the football star on the field. He takes his role as older brother very seriously. In The Right Stuff, Macie is throwing a pool party for her advanced French class (of which Will is a student of). When Will sees Darren, he rudely picks him up and throws him into the pool, even after Darren claims that he'll rust (referring to his headgear). Also, in Fast Reputation, Ginger, Dodie, and Macie crash a party that Will is chugging sodas at. In New Girl in Town, Ginger asks Will to come to a party she's throwing for the new girl, but he refuses until he finds out it's in a morgue. He occasionally offers Darren brotherly advice; in the series finale, The Wedding Frame, he gives Darren a little advice on how to handle his devastated relationship with Ginger, but he quickly turns the conversation to center around himself.

=== Mr. Patterson ===
Voiced by Billy Brown

Darren and Will's father is known for his head noogies. In Hello Stranger, he gives Ginger a head noogie to congratulate her on her poem. He claims that his head noogies worked for him when he was trying to get a date with Mrs. Patterson in Foutley's On Ice.

=== Mrs. Patterson ===
Voiced by Ja'net Dubois

Darren and Will's mother is only seen a few times in the whole series. In Never Can Say Goodbye, she shouted for joy when she saw her baby boy (Darren) without his headgear on. Also, in the episode Far From Home, we see her inquiring about how Darren's doing after he suffers a bout of depression when Ginger leaves to spend a semester in Avalanche Academy. In the series finale, she seemed ticked off with her two sons after she found out that she was supposed to receive an invitation to the Foutley's wedding, but never actually did. This means she was completely unaware of Darren's unfaithfulness to Ginger, however surprisingly Darren can be seen at the wedding.

== The Griplings ==
=== Courtney Gripling ===
Voiced by Liz Georges

Courtney Claire Gripling, who is 12 years old and, is the most popular girl at Lucky Jr. High (although she did have some difficulties trying to fit in at high school). While not extremely book-smart, Courtney is not a typical ditzy blonde: she takes an advanced language class that Macie also attends and is very curious about the world around her, particularly the world outside the millionaire lifestyle her family maintains. She is also quite knowledgeable in fashion and in the complex code of conduct necessary to become and stay popular in middle school, though it is shown throughout the series that even Courtney can sometimes fail at this. She can be mean and shallow, judging people by their clothing (once even forgiving Ginger's avoidance of her because of a particularly well chosen outfit Ginger wore to school) and being insensitive to those who are less popular, but she can also be a very caring and attentive friend. Courtney is very naive because of her sheltered upbringing, being puzzled as to how a vacuum cleaner works, what happens at regular summer camps, and sometimes even as to how genuine care and acceptance are like. This leads her to attach very quickly to those who demonstrate an honest affection towards her. Courtney took a liking to Ginger early on in the series, wanting to see how Ginger would survive if put in an all-popular kids setting. To her surprise, Ginger could manage, and the two became real friends, and it is towards Ginger that Courtney's sincere affections are often directed. She notably drove to Ginger's home to thank her for stopping her lice infection from becoming public knowledge, travelled to Avalanche Arts to convince her to return, and alerted Ginger to a plan to separate her from boyfriend Darren, even though a few of her own close friends were part of the scheme.

However, even Ginger receives the occasional "Courtney-ism", considering that Courtney has a whole group of friends to manage. Closest of those friends to Courtney is her right-hand woman, Miranda, who strongly dislikes Ginger. Courtney's group seems to approve of her leader status. In No Hope for Courtney, a girl named Hope takes on Courtney's position, leaving Courtney in a social slump. In the end, Courtney reclaims her position as leader and Hope becomes one of her many followers.

In Mommie Nearest, Courtney's mother has to stay in the hospital after she gets an infection from a face lift. Courtney then spends more time with Ginger's mother, Lois, as a temporary replacement. It results in Courtney staying a few nights in Ginger's home. Ginger quickly becomes jealous of the natural mother-daughter relationship Courtney and Lois have. In Fair to Cloudy, Ginger invited Darren to the county fair without consulting her normal companions, Dodie and Macie. Dodie then retaliates by inviting Courtney. At the fair, Courtney, as Ginger put it, "has to try everything", as she is intrigued that such a lifestyle exists.

Courtney's main love interest throughout the show is Darren's older brother, Will, though the latter is usually either oblivious or uninterested. Courtney's reasons for attending a public school are left unexplained. Her younger brother, Blake, also attends a public school. It could possibly be that, similar to the character Veronica Lodge from the Archie comics, that their father enrolled them in public schools to avoid them being spoiled - without any success. Courtney sometimes refers to Macie as "Stacey" or "Kacey" and Dodie as "Potie." The girls in Courtney's inner circle (not all at once) have included Ginger, Miranda, Mipsy, Missy, Mindy, Traci, Stacey, Kacie, Donna, Diva, Dinah, Heather, Lonnie, and Hope. These members change: they have been added and dropped over the course of the series (with the exceptions of Miranda, Mipsy and Ginger).

In the series finale, The Wedding Frame, Courtney's family loses their fortune as a result of her father's illicit activities and they are forced to leave their mansion to find more "modest accommodations" as Blake would later put. Due to this the Griplings ending up buying the Foutleys' soon-to-be vacant home; ironically, Ginger and her family move into the same wealthy neighborhood where the Griplings resided in. Courtney and Ginger remain friends and the former even attends Lois' wedding in plain clothes similar to Ginger's style. She is however strangely absent from the final shot during Ginger's reading of her book in the future, suggesting that their friendship didn't have last throughout.

=== Blake Gripling ===
Voiced by Tara Strong (pilot); Kath Soucie (series)

Blake Sofia Gripling is Courtney's younger brother. He's the youngest of the main cast at 7 years old, and is Carl and Hoodsey's classmate, having moved up a couple grades because of his great intellect. He is however quite spoiled and devious while being a gentleman. Despite always being at odds with Carl, deep down, he wants to be his best friend. But as Carl turns him down time after time (while trying to humiliate him in the process), Blake tries to best the youngest Foutley whenever he can. Blake has a dislike for Hoodsey (whom he sometimes refer to as 'Woodsey') and doesn't get along too well with his sister Courtney. Winston, the butler of the Griplings, is something of a father figure to Blake and often involved in his schemes. He was named Blake as part of a family tradition so that his initials, "B.G.", would be in accordance with the initials on his baby blanket, a family heirloom.

=== Claire Gripling ===
Voiced by Candi Milo

Claire Gripling is Courtney and Blake's mother who believes in only spoiling her children. It has been revealed that she and Courtney take a trip to Paris (the capital of France) each spring to see the new fashions. Still, Claire has a lot to learn about being a good person. In Trouble in Gal Pal Land, Claire agrees to have Hoodsey pose as a street urchin whom she took in so she could win the election to be a board member of the country club. In Mommie Nearest, Claire goes to the hospital after a bad face lift.

=== Prescott Gripling ===
Voiced by Sam McMurray

As Ginger learns in TGIF, Prescott Gripling, Courtney and Blake's father, never missed dinner as it doesn't start unless he is on loudspeaker on the telephone as they eat. In The Wedding Frame, he was discovered as to have been arrested for insider trading. In order to pay for all of the felonies and other penalties against him, he is stripped of all of his family fortune.

=== Winston ===
Voiced by John Kassir

Faithful butler to the Griplings and sidekick to Blake, Winston is much more of a fatherly figure to Courtney and Blake than Prescott ever was. He has never married and has no children and sees the Griplings as his surrogate family rather than just his employers. He is often involved in Blake's latest schemes to ruin/befriend Carl Foutley.

== The Killgallens ==
=== Miranda Killgallen ===
Voiced by Cree Summer

Miranda Killgallen is Courtney's right-hand woman and possibly the wickedest girl in school, serving as Ginger's main antagonist on the show. Apart from having totally different personalities, Miranda's great dislike for Ginger mainly stems from her fear that "Foutley" may replace her as Courtney's best friend. On top of that, both Miranda and Ginger have a romantic interest in Ian Richton. Miranda has thwarted Ginger by all means possible, including manipulation (Dare I, Darren), blackmail (Cry Wolf), false accusations (I Spy a Witch, Ginger the Juvey), backstabbing (Wicked Game), and bribery (Far From Home). She has failed every attempt to make Ginger look bad, even raising her popularity a few times. At times, however, even "tough girl" Miranda is shown to have her weak sides.

On more than one occasion, it's illustrated that she has a difficult relationship with her strict parents and that she has very few actual friends. When Ginger finds out about this, she feels sorry for her. In Trouble in Gal-Pal Land, Miranda is left friendless when she and Courtney have a temporary falling-out; Macie states that it's because nobody likes her. Miranda is also shown to not be a true friend of Courtney's, as when Courtney briefly lost her popularity to Hope Rogers, Miranda wasted no time in abandoning Courtney to join Hope's clique. Apart from her viciousness, Miranda's trademark are her smug, sniping, sarcastic comments.

Miranda is partially of African-American heritage, but in the original version of the pilot, Miranda was originally going to be an all white girl with brunette hair.

=== Officer Killgallen ===
Voiced by Richard McGonagle

Miranda's father is a police officer. Miranda used this to her advantage when, in Ginger the Juvey, she convinced Ginger to steal a sign outside of a bank to give as a gift to Courtney, and then called her father to report the robbery. In Summer of Camp Caprice, he runs a military camp where Miranda and Darren are students.

=== Miranda's mother ===
It is not clear if Miranda's mother is still alive or currently (if ever) married to her father, or previously married to him and later got divorced, as she has never been shown or even mentioned in the series. When Macie asks Miranda if she had ever said anything nice to her mom and dad (in Trouble in Gal Pal Land), Miranda doesn't act surprised by the question. Also, Miranda refers to 'her parents' in Ginger's Solo, so it can be assumed Miranda's mother is actually still alive and well, and possibly just got divorced from her father.

== The Higsbys ==
=== Brandon Higsby and Mr. Licorice ===
Voiced by Grey DeLisle (Brandon) and Dee Bradley Baker (Mr. Licorice)

Brandon Higsby is an annoying classmate of Carl. He is extremely hyper, perpetually chipper, and considers Carl and Hoodsey his closest friends. In actuality, he doesn't have any friends, but his parents still think he's popular. His only true friend seems to be Mr. Licorice, his pet monkey, a hand-me-down from his older brother, Stuart. However, Mr. Licorice doesn't seem to like Brandon all that much.

=== Stuart Higsby ===
Voiced by Chris Marquette

Stuart Higsby is the savior to all forgetful and lazy kids at Lucky Jr. High. He runs a business in the boys' bathroom where people can purchase pre-written book reports from him at a reasonable price. At one point, Darren became a customer of his when Ginger was blackmailed into writing Miranda's report on The Call of the Wild in Cry Wolf. He owns a monkey, named Mr. Licorice, whom he eventually gives to his little brother, Brandon.

=== Mr. and Mrs. Higsby ===
Voiced by Dee Bradley Baker (Mr. Higsby) and Sally Struthers (Mrs. Higsby)

Mr. and Mrs. Higsby are Brandon and Stuart's parents. Mrs. Higsby enforces the house rules—no hyperactivity, no shoes indoors, and no feet on the furniture. Mr. Higsby is in charge of recording everything with his video camera.

== Teachers and school staff ==
=== Principal Milty ===
Voiced by Jerry Houser

Principal Milty is the former principal of Lucky Elementary and is now the principal of Lucky Jr. High. He, like most of their teachers, does not like Carl and Hoodsey. He has a dog, named The Dutchess, that Carl and Hoodsey became good friends with when they trained her in The Nurses' Strike.

=== Ms. Zorski ===
Voiced by Elizabeth Halpern

Ms. Zorski is Ginger's English teacher. She is a constant inspiration and supporter of Ginger's natural writing talent. In And She Was Gone, Ms. Zorski let Ginger know that she loved the poem she had written before she added that it concerned her. She has a cousin, also named Ms. Zorski (voiced by Shawana Kemp), who teaches at the high school. Ginger learns that the two have completely different teaching styles. Even after Ginger graduated Jr. High, she stays in touch with Ms. Zorski, since she visited Ginger in the hospital when she had appendicitis.

- Emily Kapnek, the creator, based the character of Ms. Zorski off of one of her own teachers.

=== Mrs. Gordon ===
Voiced by Kathleen Freeman

Carl's teacher, Elaine Gordon, was not the most patient woman. Despite the fact that Ginger was one of her favorite students, she hated Carl and was often the victim of some of his pranks. One was so bad that it drove her to retirement in "No Hope for Courtney". Although she promised Carl that she would come back, she died shortly after. The episode was dedicated to Kathleen Freeman, who died of lung cancer on August 23, 2001 at the age of 78.

=== Mr. Hepper ===
Voiced by Andre Ware

Mr. Hepper is the music teacher of Carl and Hoodsey. Because of his teaching subject and laid back style, he's a favorite of the two boys, and in turn is the only teacher who likes them. After Mrs. Gordon died, Hepper also took over her classes. After school, he plays in a jazz trio.

=== Mr. Cilia ===
Voiced by Lewis Arquette

The science teacher at Lucky Jr High, Mr. Cilia teaches chemistry and biology. He is Ginger's second favorite teacher after Ms. Zorski. With Ginger one of the few students to attain his high standards, she's also a favorite of him. Mr. Cilia has an ongoing struggle with the school board over funding.

- Arquette died of heart failure on February 10, 2001 at age 65. The episode Piece of My Heart was dedicated to him.

== Classmates ==
=== Ian Richton ===
Voiced by Adam Wylie

Ian Richton is the school's soccer star and major heartthrob; however, he is quite dimwitted. He is the perfect man in the eyes of both Ginger and Miranda. In The A Ticket, he is assigned to work with Ginger during chemistry classes, but lets her do all the work. Ginger mistakes his enthusiasm for something else and it takes a wake-up call from Darren for her to realize she's being used, but at the end, Ian realizes his mistakes, and lets Ginger keep his jacket. It has also been revealed that Ian has been raised by his single father. After voice actor Adam Wylie quit the cast at the end of season 1 and Ginger got over Ian in Summer Of Camp Caprice, he had no more speaking roles. Nevertheless, Ian can often be seen on school grounds and even moves on with Ginger to high school.

=== Mipsy Mipson ===
Voiced by Sandy Fox

Most likely the third most popular girl at Lucky Jr. High is Melissa "Mipsy" Mipson. She appears to be closest to Miranda and also shares her great hate for Ginger. She helps Miranda play a rude prank on Ginger in Sleep on It to make Ginger wet her sleeping bag. In Foutley's on Ice, she pays off her uncle to accept Ginger as a new student for a writing academy and convinced her cousin, also a Mipson, to take on a new persona (Thea) and convince Ginger to stay full-time. When Ginger returns to Lucky Jr. High in Wicked Game, Mipsy and Miranda convince Dodie and Macie into helping them get Darren and Ginger to break up.

Not much else is known about Mipsy. It has been suggested that she comes from a wealthy Mexican family and that if Ginger got too close to Courtney, Mipsy would be the most likely to be bumped down on the popularity chart.

=== Chet Zipper ===
Voiced by Hope Levy

Chet Zipper, who is 14 years old, is a commoner among the students at Lucky Jr. High. Although Courtney knows who he is, his status as school announcer doesn't earn him much popularity status. He speaks in a dull monotone voice and puts words like "uh", "like", and "um" in between each word. He has been a suggested love interest for Dodie. In Piece of My Heart, they are seen dancing together at the school dance. In the series finale, Chet and Dodie are shown as a married couple with a daughter of their own.

=== Linda ===
Voiced by Olivia Hack and Hope Levy

Linda is the school's hall monitor. As shown in Ginger the Juvey, she is on a first name basis with Courtney, who is the only student that she would probably let roam the halls without a hall pass.

=== Jean-Pierre ===
Voiced by Laraine Newman

Foreign exchange student Jean-Pierre could get any girl at Lucky Jr. High. In Stealing First, Courtney bets that she can get him to kiss Ginger on the chair lift on the school ski trip, to which Miranda says is impossible. In No Hope for Courtney, he takes interest in a newly made-over Hope. But in "TGIF", he and Hope are shown in a loving embrace.

=== Laetitia Bowers ===
Voiced by Cara DeLizia

Laetitia Bowers made her first appearance in New Girl in Town. She had a somewhat gothic appeal and she carried around a fake skull. Her father is a mortician. Rumors started floating around that the reason they moved to Sheltered Shrubs was because Mr. Bowers accidentally embalmed someone who wasn't dead yet. Ginger, Dodie, and Macie try to help her find her place at school, but it turns out it's with them. In later episodes, she can be seen in the background.

== Others ==
=== Dr. Fondfeelings ===
Voiced by Diane Michelle

She was first mentioned in "Dare I, Darren?"; She made her first appearance in "Never Can Say Goodbye" when Ginger ignored Darren who stopped noticing her. In "Ms. Foutley's Boys", she had a tv segment talking to women who are alone and miserable. In "The Wedding Frame", she attended Lois and Dave's Wedding.

=== Coach Candace ===
Voiced by Nora Dunn

She made her first appearance in Butterflies Are Free Part One, When Dodie was at pep squad tryouts, she was explaining to the girls what cheerleading moves they have to if they want to make the cut but she warns Dodie that no female freshman has never made the cut, causing Dodie to be more determined. In Kiss Today Goodbye, she strongly disliked her low carb healthy meal which had no taste at all, Dodie tells her she'll cook her meals for her, as a result, she is very impressed and Dodie started to work her way into helping her which included cleaning the cheerleaders hoodies, she earned presenting the pep squad in the football game. In Dodie's Big Break, she welcomed her into the pep squad as a mascot which she performed as in her first game in which she was injured and amazingly became a member of the pep squad but after finding out that Dodie continued to fake her injury that she recovered from, she kicked her off the squad. When Ginger ask her to forgive Dodie and allow her back in, she revealed her backstory about how she tried out as teen but never made it. After Ginger confronted her, she decided to let her back into the squad, but when Dodie hurt her leg, she decided to allow her to try out next year. Despite appearing in only three episodes as a story arc focusing on Dodie's aspired pep squad career.

=== Orion ===
Voiced by Justin Cowden

- After Ginger's emotional heartbreak with Darren, Ginger found comfort in Orion. The two share a boyfriend-girlfriend-like relationship, but Ginger says that she doesn't want a boyfriend. He is the drummer of the band that Ginger is a part of. In The Wedding Frame, the two have a rough time getting past Ginger's new curiosity about Darren, but Ginger quickly gets over it.

=== Simone ===
Voiced by Erica Luttrell

When Darren felt that his relationship with Ginger wasn't fresh, he cheated on her with cheerleader Simone. Darren and Ginger break up and Simone and Darren stay together. In The Wedding Frame, Darren seems to be caught up in Ginger. Simone turns to Miranda for advice, since Miranda is an expert on both Ginger and Darren. Miranda inspires her to go get her man.

=== Sasha ===
Voiced by J. Evan Bonifant

Ginger met Sasha at Camp Caprice. The two developed crushes on each other, but when Sasha heard Courtney talking about Ginger and Ian, he becomes jealous and feels betrayed. However, when Ginger leaves camp, she and Sasha are on good terms. In Ginger's Solo, the school band is going to Sasha's school in Heathered Hills to perform. Ginger uses this opportunity to see Sasha again, but is crushed when she finds out that he's gotten back together with his former girlfriend. Then, the next summer, in Heat Lightning, Ginger returns to camp. She imagines she sees Sasha and feels bad that she's obsessing over him and not thinking about her boyfriend, Darren. When he sends a message to Ginger asking her to meet him on the beach, she does. But it turns out he "just wanted to say 'hey'", not get a date. Ginger realizes that she doesn't want Sasha for a boyfriend, what she wanted were the feelings she had when she first met him.

=== Hope Rogers ===
Voiced by Jane Wiedlin

Hope Rogers is a classmate of Ginger's. She initially appeared as a background character on the show. In the episode "No Hope for Courtney", Ginger, Dodie and Macie found her crying in the girls' bathroom after Courtney called her "Faith" as she and her close group snubbed her. They decided to help her come out of her shell, giving her a list of tips. However, this resulted in them accidentally creating a monster, as Hope became more or less another version of Courtney. Overnight, Hope's popularity bloomed and she became a big hit with the cool girls. Courtney was expelled from the clique and Hope usurped her position as the most popular girl in school. After several failed attempts to rid herself of Hope, and a heated fight, it comes to light that Hope used Courtney as a model for her new look, flattering Courtney. She joins Courtney's inner circle of friends.

=== The Popular Girls ===
The Popular Girls, or "The A List" as Dodie once called them, are a clique of classmates that act as Courtney's entourage. Though the members are not always seen together, they are officially Missy, Mindy, Traci, Stacey, Casey, Donna, Diva, Dinah, Heather, Lonnie, and Hope. Aside from Miranda, Mipsy, and Hope, the girls in the clique rarely have any part in the show's plot, and seldom have any dialogue. Despite having Courtney as their leader, they are shown not to be actual friends with her, as they turned on Courtney when her social status slipped. In the episode No Hope for Courtney, they threw Courtney from their group without a thought after Hope Rogers became more popular. However, they appear to be on friendly terms with Ginger, but apparently cannot tolerate Dodie or Macie. In the episode About Face, Dodie's attitude toward the popular girls changed after they made very hurtful remarks about her mother, and she realized just how superficial they were. When Dodie enters high school, she focuses on trying to make the pep squad.

=== Noelle Sussman ===
Voiced by Emily Kapnek

- Always a member of Carl's class, Noelle Sussman has telekinetic powers (she can move things with her mind). In And She Was Gone, Carl thought that no one would miss her if he used her to test his disappearing powder on. It turns out he missed her. Luckily, she only transferred to an elementary school across town. In Wicked Game, she lost Carl in a bet to Polly Shuster, a girl obsessed with birds. For an entire weekend, Carl would have to dress up like a bird and play Parrot World with her. Blake took pictures of Carl actually enjoying this game with Polly and showed them to Noelle in About Face. The two don't speak until The Wedding Frame.

Noelle also kissed Hoodsey in the episode Foutley's on Ice; they tried making Hoodsey more manly in order for him to pose as an adult for a competition that they were going to join. This caused great jealousy on Carl's part after he witnessed the kiss, not knowing that it was purely experimental. She's originally from Portugal and is fluent in Portuguese.

=== Chantal and Andrea ===
Voiced by Kimberly Brooks and Jamie Maria Cronin

- When Macie and Courtney entered a high school-level French class, Macie was volunteered to throw a pool party. Two girls in that class, Chantal and Andrea, want to make a fool of their new classmate, Courtney. Luckily, Macie finds out about their plan to de-bikini Courtney and she, Ginger, Dodie, and Darren are able to stop them.

=== Maude ===
Voiced by Carol Kane

- In the episode "Carl and Maude", when Ginger, Dodie, and Macie are forced to do community service at a retirement home, they take Carl along and he falls in love with an elderly prankster named Maude. Maude and Carl pull many foolish pranks together and Carl decides to invite her to dinner and propose; however, Maude dies during dinner.

Maude reappears as a spirit in I Spy a Witch.
