= Carol Kane =

American actress (born 1952)

- Kane in 2026
- Born: June 18, 1952 (age 74); Cleveland, Ohio, U.S.
- Occupations: Actress; comedian
- Years active: 1966–present

Carol Kane (born June 18, 1952) is an American actress and comedian. She gained recognition for her role in Hester Street (1975), for which she received an Academy Award nomination for Best Actress. She became known in the 1970s and 1980s in films such as Dog Day Afternoon (1975), Annie Hall (1977), When a Stranger Calls (1979), The Princess Bride (1987), Scrooged (1988) and Flashback (1990).

Kane appeared on the television series Taxi in the early 1980s as Simka Gravas, the wife of Latka (played by Andy Kaufman), winning two Emmy Awards for her work. She has played the character of Madame Morrible in the musical Wicked, both in touring productions and on Broadway from 2005 to 2014. From 2015 to 2020, she was a main cast member on the Netflix series Unbreakable Kimmy Schmidt, in which she played Lillian Kaushtupper. She currently plays the recurring role of Pelia in Star Trek: Strange New Worlds (2023–present).

== Early life ==
Kane was born on June 18, 1952, in Cleveland, Ohio, the daughter of Joy, a jazz singer, teacher, dancer, and pianist, and architect Michael Kane. Her family is Jewish, and her grandparents emigrated from Russia, Austria, and Poland. Due to her father's occupation, Kane moved frequently as a child; she briefly lived in Paris at age eight, where she began learning to speak French. Additionally, she resided in Haiti at age 10. Her parents divorced when she was 12 years old.

She attended the Cherry Lawn School, a boarding school in Darien, Connecticut, until 1965. She studied theater at HB Studio and also went to the Professional Children's School in New York City. She became a member of both the Screen Actors Guild and the Actors' Equity Association at age 14. Kane made her professional theater debut in a 1966 production of The Prime of Miss Jean Brodie starring Tammy Grimes, her first job as a member of Actors' Equity.

== Career ==
=== 1971–1979: Career beginnings and early recognition ===
Kane's on-screen career began while she was a teenager, when she appeared in minor roles in films such as Desperate Characters and Mike Nichols's Carnal Knowledge in 1971, the latter of which led her to befriend lead actor Jack Nicholson. In 1972, she was cast in her first leading role in the Canadian production Wedding in White, where she played a teenage rape victim who is forced into marriage by her father; the film won the Canadian Screen Award for Best Motion Picture at the 24th Canadian Film Awards. She also appeared as a sex worker in Hal Ashby's 1973 film The Last Detail, where she collaborated with Nicholson again.

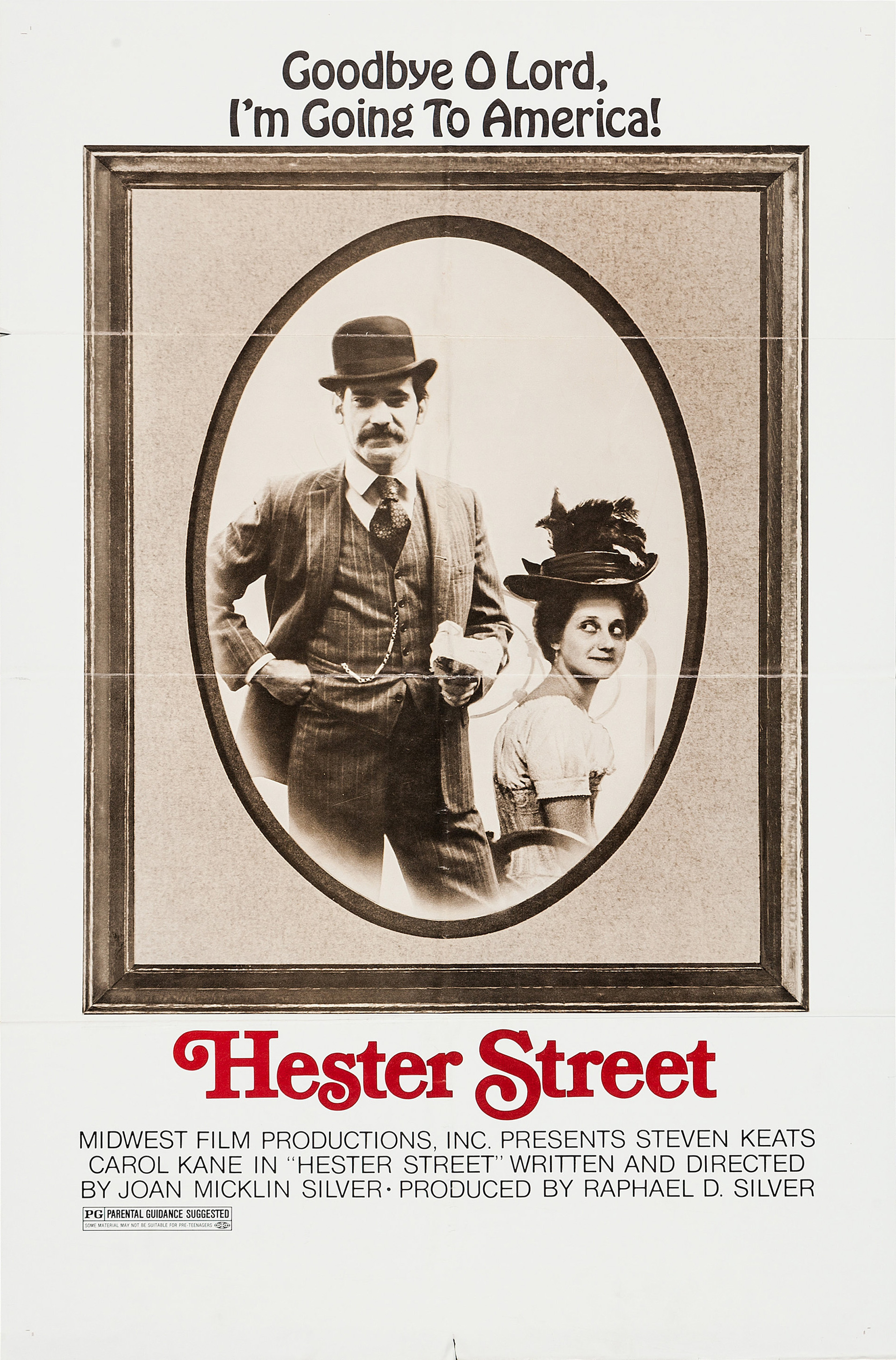
Theatrical release poster for Hester Street (1975)

In 1975, Kane was cast in Joan Micklin Silver's feature-length debut Hester Street, in which she played a Russian-Jewish immigrant who struggles with her husband to assimilate in late 19th-century New York. For her performance in the film, Kane garnered her sole Academy Award nomination for Best Actress at the 48th Academy Awards, and it remains her favorite of all her roles. Additionally, in 1975 she appeared as a bank teller in Sidney Lumet's crime drama Dog Day Afternoon, which received numerous Academy Award nominations in other categories that same year. This also marked her first on-screen collaboration with Al Pacino, whom she had known prior to the film thanks to their shared background in theater.

Despite this recognition, however, Kane has recounted waiting for approximately a year before being cast in her next role, which she has attributed to the trend of actors being typecast after receiving awards attention. Her return to the screen would come with Gene Wilder's 1977 comedy The World's Greatest Lover, which she has credited for identifying the comedic talents that would become her staple in later years. During the same year, she was cast in Woody Allen's romantic comedy Annie Hall, where she played Allison Portchnik, the first wife of Allen's character Alvy Singer. She also appeared in Ken Russell's film Valentino, which, like The World's Greatest Lover, takes inspiration from the silent film era, as it is a biographical drama loosely inspired by the life of Rudolph Valentino.

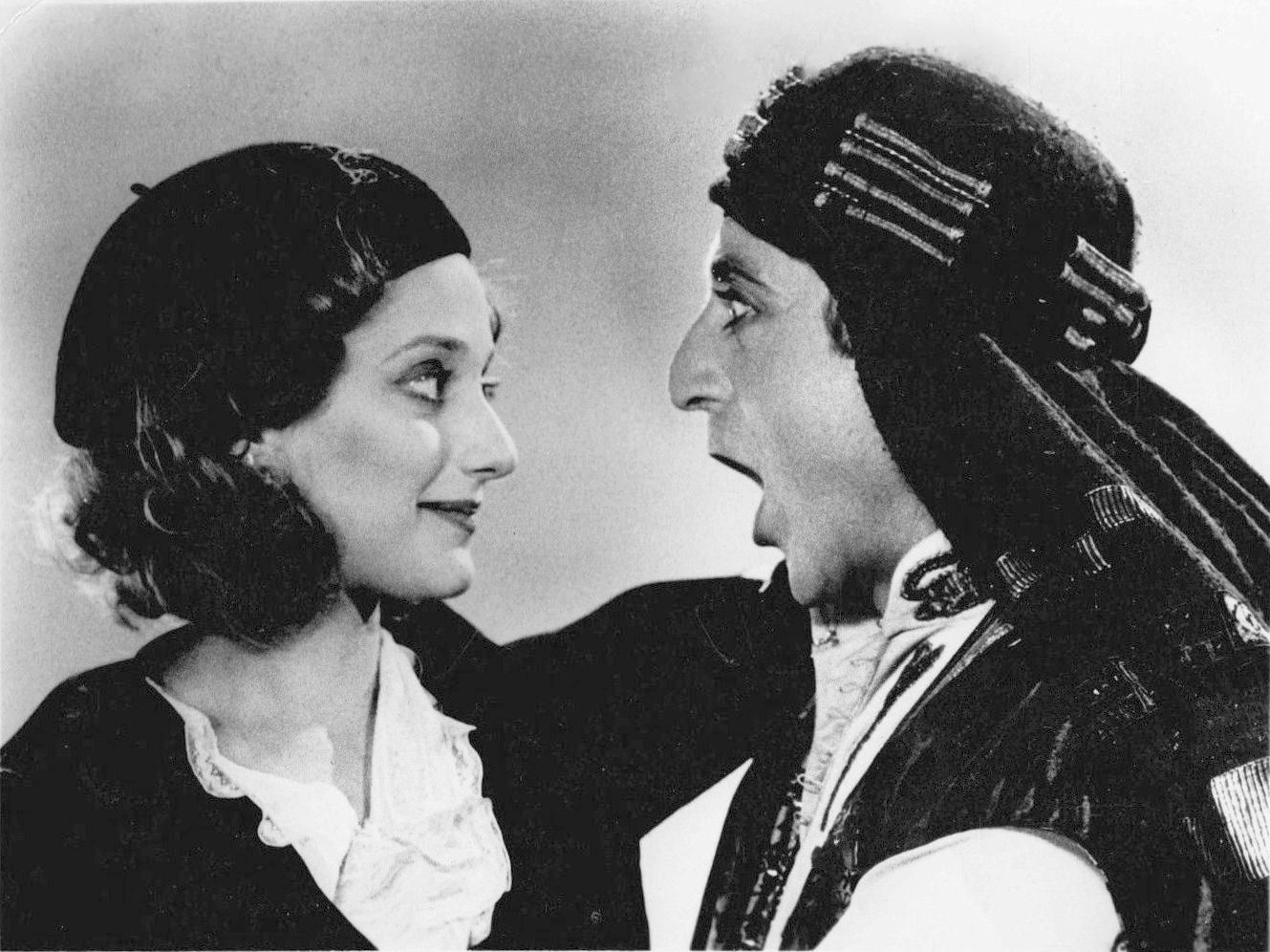
Kane and Gene Wilder in a publicity photo for The World's Greatest Lover, 1977

After this, Kane appeared in the horror films The Mafu Cage (1978) and When a Stranger Calls (1979); ironically, Kane herself is largely averse to horror, and she admits to being unable to watch the latter. In 1979, she also appeared in a cameo role in The Muppet Movie, as well as played an emotionally dependent and childish American woman in La Sabina. For her performance in the latter she won the CEC Award for Best Supporting Actress.

=== 1980–1990: Taxi and transition into comedy ===
From 1980 to 1983, Kane portrayed Simka Dahblitz-Gravas, the wife of Andy Kaufman's character Latka Gravas, on the American television series Taxi. She has theorized that she was cast in Taxi in part due to her work in Hester Street, where a significant portion of her dialogue was spoken in Yiddish, since Simka speaks a fictional language with a vaguely Eastern European accent.

Kane has attributed the on-screen rapport she shared with Kaufman to their different work ethics: where she was trained in the theater and enjoyed rehearsal time, Kaufman was rooted more in stand-up comedy and did not care for rehearsals, a contrast that she believes enhanced their believability as a married couple. However, she maintains that she and Kaufman had a loving relationship on set, and she has spoken fondly of him in retrospective interviews. Kane received two Emmy Awards for her work on Taxi. Her role on the series has largely been credited as the beginning of her pivot towards more comedic roles, as she began to regularly appear in sitcoms and comedy films after the series ended.

In 1984, Kane appeared in episode 12, season 3 of Cheers as Amanda, an acquaintance of Diane Chambers from her time spent in a mental institution. She was also a regular on the 1986 series All Is Forgiven.

In 1987, Kane appeared in Ishtar, Elaine May's notorious box-office flop turned cult classic, playing the frustrated girlfriend of Dustin Hoffman's character. That year also saw her make one of her most recognizable film appearances in Rob Reiner's fantasy romance The Princess Bride, where she played Valerie, the wife of Miracle Max (Billy Crystal). In 1988, Kane appeared in the Cinemax Comedy Experiment Rap Master Ronnie: A Report Card alongside Jon Cryer and the Smothers Brothers. During the same year, she was also featured in the Bill Murray vehicle Scrooged, where she portrayed a contemporary version of the Ghost of Christmas Present, depicted in the film as a fairy. For this performance, Variety called her "unquestionably [the] pic's comic highlight". Additionally, she played a potential love interest for Steve Martin's character in the 1990 film My Blue Heaven.

=== 1990–2004: Television and film regularity ===
Kane became a regular on the NBC series American Dreamer, which ran from 1990 to 1991. In 1993, she appeared in Addams Family Values where she replaced Judith Malina as Grandmama Addams; this role saw her reunite with her Taxi castmate Christopher Lloyd. She also guest starred on a 1994 episode of Seinfeld, as well as a 1996 episode of Ellen. In 1996, she was given a supporting role in the short-lived sitcom Pearl. From there, she continued to appear in a number of film roles throughout the 1990s and early 2000s, including The Pallbearer (1996), Office Killer (1997), Jawbreaker (1999), and My First Mister (2001). In 1998, she voiced Mother Duck in the American version of the animated television film The First Snow of Winter.

In 1999, she made a cameo in the Andy Kaufman biopic Man on the Moon as herself playing the Taxi character.

=== 2005–2014: Wicked and career expansion ===
Kane is also known for her portrayal of the evil headmistress Madame Morrible in the Broadway musical Wicked, whom she played in various productions from 2005 to 2014. Kane made her Wicked debut on the 1st National Tour, playing the role from March 9 through December 19, 2005. She then reprised the role in the Broadway production from January 10 through November 12, 2006. She again played the role for the Los Angeles production which began performances on February 7, 2007. She left the production on December 30, 2007, and later returned on August 26, 2008, until the production closed on January 11, 2009.

In January 2009, she guest starred in the television series Two and a Half Men as the mother of Alan Harper's receptionist.

She then transferred with the Los Angeles company of Wicked to reprise her role once again, this time in the San Francisco production, which began performances January 27, 2009. She ended her limited engagement on March 22, 2009.

In March 2010, Kane appeared in the ABC series Ugly Betty as Justin Suarez's acting teacher.

Kane starred in the off-Broadway play Love, Loss, and What I Wore in February 2010. She made her West End debut in January 2011 in a major revival of Lillian Hellman's drama The Children's Hour at London's Comedy Theatre, where she starred alongside Keira Knightley, Elisabeth Moss and Ellen Burstyn. In May 2012, Kane appeared on Broadway as Betty Chumley in a revival of the play Harvey.

Kane returned to the Broadway company of Wicked from July 1, 2013, through February 22, 2014, a period that included the show's 10th anniversary.

In 2014, she was cast in a recurring role on the television series Gotham as Gertrude Kapelput, the Hungarian-born mother of Oswald Cobblepot, also known as Penguin.

=== 2015–present: Unbreakable Kimmy Schmidt and legacy roles ===
In 2015, Kane was cast in the recurring role of Lillian Kaushtupper, the landlord to the title character of the Netflix series Unbreakable Kimmy Schmidt. Kane joined the cast due in part to her admiration of showrunner Tina Fey, with whom she had previously wanted to collaborate on the NBC series 30 Rock. She was promoted to a series regular for the show's second season. Unbreakable Kimmy Schmidt ran for four seasons, making it one of Kane's longest television roles to date. She reprised the role in the "interactive" television special Kimmy vs the Reverend.

In 2018, Kane was cast in Jacques Audiard's Western film The Sisters Brothers. In 2019, she appeared in Jim Jarmusch's horror comedy The Dead Don't Die, marking another collaboration with Bill Murray. That same year, she was featured in the recurring role of Bianca Nova in season one of the HBO series Los Espookys, where she reunited with her Unbreakable Kimmy Schmidt castmate Fred Armisen.

In 2020, Kane was featured in the ensemble cast of the Amazon series Hunters, which also includes her longtime acquaintance Al Pacino. Additionally, during the same year, she participated in two cast reunion fundraisers, one with the cast of Taxi for the Actors Fund, the other with the cast of The Princess Bride for the Democratic Party of Wisconsin.

It was announced on Star Trek Day 2022 that Kane would join the cast of Star Trek: Strange New Worlds for season two as Chief Engineer Pelia. Prior to her casting, Kane had never seen an episode of the original Star Trek series, though she has said the show's writers thought this oversight improved her performance.

In 2024, Kane starred in Nathan Silver's comedy film Between the Temples, in which she portrays a woman who, having been raised by secular parents, decides to have a bat mitzvah later in life. Kane has stated that she drew inspiration from Silver's mother, who studied for a bat mitzvah in her sixties; she was also inspired by her own mother, who, at age 55, moved to Paris to become a musician. For her work in the film, she received the New York Film Critics Circle Award for Best Supporting Actress, and was nominated for Best Supporting Performance at the Independent Spirit Awards. In December 2024, she was announced as part of the cast of Darren Aronofsky's film Caught Stealing, where she plays Bubbe, a small role as a grandmother to two Jewish gangsters.

== Personal life ==
Kane was in a relationship with actor Woody Harrelson from 1986 to 1988. The two have remained friends since their break-up, and Harrelson was seen attending Kane's 60th birthday party in 2012.

She has never been married or had any children. Regarding the latter decision, she has said, "I never felt that I would be calm and stable enough to be the kind of mother I'd like to be. I don't think everyone randomly is mother material."

Kane is often noted for her high, breathy, slow voice, though her vocal timbre has grown raspier with age. Kane, who has often altered her voice to suit various roles, has confessed to disliking it, telling People magazine in 2020 that she wishes her voice was "deep and beautiful and sexy".

A documentary about Kane and her 98-year-old mother Joy premiered in 2025, titled Carol & Joy.

== Filmography ==
Key
†	Denotes films that have not yet been released

=== Film ===
Year	Title	Role	Notes
1971	Desperate Characters	Young Girl	
1971	Carnal Knowledge	Jennifer	
1972	Wedding in White	Jeannie Dougall	
1972	...and Hope to Die (aka. La course du lièvre à travers les champs)		Scenes cut from finished film
1973	The Last Detail	Young Whore	
1975	Hester Street	Gitl	
1975	Dog Day Afternoon	Jenny	
1976	Harry and Walter Go to New York	Florence	
1977	Annie Hall	Allison Portchnik	
1977	Valentino	Jean Acker	
1977	The World's Greatest Lover	Annie Hickman	
1978	The Mafu Cage	Cissy	
1979	The Muppet Movie	Myth	
1979	When a Stranger Calls	Jill Johnson	
1979	La Sabina	Daisy	
1981	The Games of Countess Dolingen	Louise Haines-Pearson	
1981	Strong Medicine		
1982	Pandemonium	Candy	
1982	Norman Loves Rose	Rose	
1983	Can She Bake a Cherry Pie?	Customer at Cafe	
1984	Over the Brooklyn Bridge	Cheryl	
1984	Racing with the Moon	Annie the Hooker	
1984	The Secret Diary of Sigmund Freud	Martha Bernays	
1984	Terror in the Aisles	Jill Johnson (archival footage)	Documentary film
1985	Transylvania 6-5000	Lupi	
1986	Jumpin' Jack Flash	Cynthia	
1987	Ishtar	Carol	
1987	The Princess Bride	Valerie	
1988	Sticky Fingers	Kitty	
1988	License to Drive	Mrs. Anderson	
1988	Scrooged	Ghost of Christmas Present	
1990	The Lemon Sisters	Franki D'Angelo	
1990	Flashback	Maggie	
1990	Joe Versus the Volcano	Hairdresser cameo	
1990	My Blue Heaven	Shaldeen	
1991	Ted & Venus	Colette	
1992	In the Soup	Barbara	
1992	Baby on Board	Maria	
1992	The Real Story of Here Comes the Bride	Margaret Mouse	Voice role
1993	Even Cowgirls Get the Blues	Carla	
1993	Addams Family Values	Grandmama	
1994	The Crazysitter	Treva Van Arsdale	
1995	Theodore Rex	Molly Rex	Direct-to-video, voice role
1996	Big Bully	Faith	
1996	American Strays	Helen	
1996	Sunset Park	Mona	
1996	The Pallbearer	Mrs. Thompson	
1996	Trees Lounge	Connie	
1997	Gone Fishin'	Donna Waters	
1997	Office Killer	Dorine Douglas	
1998	The Tic Code	Miss Gimpole	
1999	Jawbreaker	Principal Sherwood	
1999	Man on the Moon	Herself/Simka Dahblitz	
1999	The Wacky Adventures of Ronald McDonald	Org's mother	Short film, voice role
2000	The Office Party	Linda	Short film
2001	D.C. Smalls	Mother	Short film
2001	My First Mister	Mrs. Benson	
2001	The Shrink Is In	Dr. Louise Rosenberg	
2001	Tomorrow by Midnight	Officer Garfield	
2002	Love in the Time of Money	Joey	
2003	Cosmopolitan	Mrs. Shaw	
2004	Confessions of a Teenage Drama Queen	Miss Baggoli	
2005	The Pacifier	Helga	
2005	The Civilization of Maxwell Bright	Temple	
2005	The Happy Elf	Gilda	Voice role
2008	Kung Fu Panda: Secrets of the Furious Five	Sheep	Voice role
2008	Four Christmases	Aunt Sarah	Uncredited
2010	The Bounty Hunter	Dawn	
2010	My Girlfriend's Boyfriend	Barbara	
2010	Pete Smalls Is Dead	Landlady	
2011	The Key Man	Marsha	
2012	Sleepwalk with Me	Linda Pandamiglio	
2012	Should've Been Romeo	Ruth	
2012	Thanks for Sharing	Roberta	
2013	Clutter	Linda Bradford	
2014	Emoticon ;)	Hannah Song	
2015	Ava's Possessions	Talia	
2018	The Sisters Brothers	Mrs. Sisters	
2018	Ghost Light	Madeline Styne	
2019	The Dead Don't Die	Mallory O'Brien	
2022	iMordecai	Fela	
2023	Migration	Erin	Voice role
2024	Between the Temples	Carla Kessler	Also executive producer
2024	Boundary Springs	Granny	
2025	Caught Stealing	Bubbe	All Yiddish role
2025	Carol & Joy	Herself	Documentary short
2026	Roommates	Gigi	
TBA	Anxious People †	TBA	Post-production

=== Television ===
Year	Title	Role	Notes
1974	We, the Woman	Susannah White	TV movie
1978	Visions		Episode: "Fans of the Kosko Show"
1978	Great Performances	Eliza Southgate	Out of Our Father's House (anthology series - play
1980	The Greatest Man in the World	April	TV movie
1980, 1982–1983	Taxi	Simka Dahblitz / Simka Dahblitz-Gravas	Guest episodes (seasons 2, 4), main cast (season 5)
1981	Great Performances	Frances Loomis	Episode: "The Girls in Their Summer Dresses and Other Stories"
1982	Laverne & Shirley	Olga	Episode: "Jinxed"
1983	An Invasion of Privacy	Ilene Cohen	TV movie
1983	American Playhouse	Lavinia	Episode: "Keeping On"
1983	Faerie Tale Theatre	The "Good" Fairy	Episode: "Sleeping Beauty"
1984	Burning Rage	Mary Harwood	TV movie
1984	Cheers	Amanda Boyer	Episode: "A Ditch in Time"
1985	Tales from the Darkside	Anne MacColl	Episode: "Snip, Snip"
1985	Crazy Like a Fox		Episode: "Bum Tip"
1986	Tall Tales & Legends	Barbara	Episode: "Casey at the Bat"
1986	All Is Forgiven	Nicolette Bingham	Main cast
1987	Paul Reiser Out on a Whim	Fortune Teller	TV movie
1988	Drop-Out Mother	Maxine	TV movie
1988	Rap Master Ronnie: A Report Card		TV movie
1989	Sesame Street	Nina the Nice	Episode: "Bob accompanies Oscar to Grouchytown"
1990	Tales from the Crypt	Judy	Episode: "Judy, You're Not Yourself Today"
1990	Tiny Toon Adventures	Ollie	Episode: "A Quack in the Quarks" (voice role)
1990–1991	American Dreamer	Lillian Abernathy	Main cast
1991–1992	Brooklyn Bridge	Aunt Sylvia	5 episodes
1992	Sibs	Sally	Episodes: "The Crash: Part 1", "The Crash: Part 2"
1992	The Ray Bradbury Theater	Polly	Episode: "Tomorrow's Child"
1993	When a Stranger Calls Back	Jill Johnson	TV movie
1993	TriBeCa	Amanda	Episode: "Stepping Back"
1993	Eligible Dentist		TV movie
1994	Seinfeld	Corinne	Episode: "The Marine Biologist"
1994	All-Star 25th Birthday: Stars and Street Forever!	Nina the Nice	TV special, a.k.a.Sesame Street All-Star 25th Birthday: Stars and Street Forever!, archival footage
1994	Aladdin	Brawnhilda	Episodes: "Stinkerbelle", "Smells Like Trouble" (voice role)
1994	Empty Nest	Shelby	Episode: "The Courtship of Carol's Father"
1995	A.J.'s Time Travelers	Emily Roebling	Episode: "Brooklyn Bridge"
1995	Dad, the Angel & Me	The Angel	TV movie
1995	Napoleon	Spider	TV movie, (voice role, English version)
1995	Freaky Friday	Leanne Futterman	TV movie
1996	Chicago Hope	Marguerite Birch	Episode: "Stand"
1996	Ellen	Lily Penney	Episode: "A Penney Saved"
1996–1997	Pearl	Annie Caraldo	Main cast
1997	Hey Arnold!	Emily Dickinson Trophy	Episode: "Freeze Frame/Phoebe Cheats" (voice role)
1997	The Tony Danza Show	Simka Gravas	Episode: "The Milk Run"
1997	Homicide: Life on the Street	Gwen Munch	Episode: "All Is Bright"
1997	Merry Christmas, George Bailey	Cousin Tilly/Mrs. Hatch	TV movie
1998	The First Seven Years	Mrs. Feld	TV short
1998	Adventures from the Book of Virtues	The Beetle	Episode: "Patience" (voice role)
1998	Noddy	Tooth Fairy	Episode: "The Tooth Fairy"
1999	Noah's Ark	Sarah	TV movie
1999	Blue's Clues	Little Miss Muffet	Episode: "Blue's Big Treasure Hunt" (voice role)
1999–2000	Beggars and Choosers	Lydia Luddin	3 episodes
2000	As Told by Ginger	Maude	Episodes: "I Spy a Witch"; "Carl and Maude" (voice role)
2001	Family Guy	Carol	Episode: "Emission Impossible" (voice role)
2002	That's Life	Gloria	Episode: "Baum's Thesis"
2002	The Grubbs	Sophie Grubb	Episode: "Pilot"
2003	Audrey's Rain	Missy Flanders	TV movie
2004	Hope & Faith	Cornelia Rackett	Episode: "Faith Scare-Field"
2005	The Grim Adventures of Billy & Mandy	Mrs. Claus	Episode: "Billy and Mandy Save Christmas" (voice role)
2006	The Year Without a Santa Claus	Mother Nature	TV movie, cameo
2009	Two and a Half Men	Shelly	Episodes: "Thank God for Scoliosis"; "David Copperfield Slipped Me a Roofie"
2009	Monk	Joy	Episode: "Mr. Monk Is the Best Man"
2009, 2013	Law & Order: Special Victims Unit	Gwen Munch	Episodes: "Zebras", "Wonderland Story"
2010	Ugly Betty	Lena Korvinka	Episode: "All the World's a Stage"
2011	Dora the Explorer	Grandma Troll	Episode: "The Grumpy Old Troll Gets Married" (voice role)
2011–2012	Jake and the Never Land Pirates	Sea Witch	2 episodes (voice role)
2011–2014	Phineas and Ferb	Nana Shapiro	2 episodes (voice role)
2013	Girls	Cloris	Episode: "It's Back"
2013	Anger Management	Carol	Episode: "Charlie and His New Friend with Benefits"
2014–2016	Gotham	Gertrud Kapelput	Recurring role (seasons 1–2)
2015–2019	Unbreakable Kimmy Schmidt	Lillian Kaushtupper	Main cast
2016	Crowded	Linda	Episode: "Given to Fly"
2017	Halt and Catch Fire	Denise	Episode: "Ten of Swords"
2017	Star vs. the Forces of Evil	Dr. Jelly Goodwell	Episode: "Princess Turdina/Starfari" (voice role)
2017–2019	OK K.O.! Let's Be Heroes	Ginger	2 episodes (voice role)
2018	Pinkalicious & Peterrific	Edna	3 episodes (voice role)
2018	Animals	Chompy	2 episodes (voice role)
2018–2021	F Is for Family	Marilyn Chilson	5 episodes (voice role)
2018–2021	Vampirina	Madame Spook	2 episodes (voice role)
2018–2019	Rapunzel's Tangled Adventure	Madam Canardist	3 episodes (voice role)
2019	Los Espookys	Bianca Nova	Recurring role (season 1)
2019	Bubble Guppies	The Sea Witch	Episode: "The New Guppy!" (voice role)
2019	Big Mouth	The Menopause Banshee	Episode: "Florida" (voice role)
2019	Summer Camp Island	Barb Junior	Episode: "The Great Elf Invention Convention" (voice role)
2020	Unbreakable Kimmy Schmidt: Kimmy vs the Reverend	Lillian Kaushtupper	TV movie
2020–2023	Hunters	Mindy Markowitz	Main cast
2022	Naked Mole Rat Gets Dressed: The Underground Rock Experience	Grand-Mah	TV movie (voice role)
2022	The Simpsons	Blythe	Episode: "Step Brother from the Same Planet" (voice role)
2023–present	Star Trek: Strange New Worlds	Pelia	Recurring role
2024	Dinner with the Parents	Nana	Main cast
2024	Monster High	Ghoul-ma Vondergeist	Episode: "Ghoulishly Ghoulma" (voice role)
2024–2025	Moon Girl and Devil Dinosaur	Bube Bina	3 episodes (voice role)
2025	Super Duper Bunny League	Captain Stickybeard	Episode: "Space Pirates!" (voice role)
2025	Poker Face	Lucille Lunbinski	Episode: "Hometown Hero"
2025	Happy's Place	Theresa	Episode: "Izzy and the Professor"
2025–2026	It's Always Sunny in Philadelphia	Samantha	Special guest Episodes: "The Golden Bachelor Live", and "Frank Marries a Corpse"

=== Stage ===
Year	Title	Role	Venue	Notes
1972	Ring Around the Bathtub	Esme Train	Broadway; Martin Beck Theatre	
1978	The Effect of Gamma Rays on Man-in-the-Moon Marigolds	Tillie	Broadway; Biltmore Theatre	
1987	A Woman of Mystery	Un Named Woman	Los Angeles; Court Theatre	Directed by John Cassavetes
2003	The Exonerated	Sunny Jacobs	Touring	Replacement
2004	Sly Fox	Miss Fancy	Broadway; Ethel Barrymore Theatre	Replacement
2005; 2007; 2008; 2009	Wicked	Madame Morrible	Touring	
2006; 2013	Wicked	Madame Morrible	Broadway; Gershwin Theatre	Replacement
2012	Harvey	Betty Chumley	Broadway; Studio 54	
2019	Call Me Madam	Grand Duchess Sophie	Encores!	

=== Music videos ===
Year	Title	Artist(s)
1985	"This Is My Night"	Chaka Khan

== Awards and nominations ==
Year	Award	Category	Work	Result
1976	Academy Awards	Best Actress	Hester Street	Nominated
1978	Drama Desk Award	Outstanding Featured Actress in a Play	The Effect of Gamma Rays on Man-in-the-Moon Marigolds	Nominated
1980	CEC Awards	Best Supporting Actress	La Sabina	Won
1982	AACTA Awards	Best Actress in a Leading Role	Norman Loves Rose	Nominated
1982	Primetime Emmy Awards	Outstanding Lead Actress in a Comedy Series	Taxi	Won
1983	Primetime Emmy Awards	Outstanding Supporting Actress in a Comedy, Variety or Music Series	Taxi	Won
1983	Golden Globe Awards	Best Supporting Actress in a Series, Miniseries or Television Film	Taxi	Nominated
1996	Primetime Emmy Awards	Outstanding Guest Actress in a Drama Series	Chicago Hope	Nominated
2006	TV Land Award	Most Wonderful Wedding	Taxi	Nominated (Note: Shared with Andy Kaufman.)
2007	Medallion Award		Taxi	Won (Note: Shared with Danny DeVito, Jeff Conaway, Tony Danza, Judd Hirsch, James L. Brooks and Randall Carver.)
2024	New York Film Critics Circle Award	Best Supporting Actress	Between the Temples	Won
2024	Independent Spirit Awards	Best Supporting Performance	Between the Temples	Nominated
