= Lillian Kaushtupper =

- Unbreakable Kimmy Schmidt character
- First appearance: "Kimmy Goes Outside!" (1.01); March 6, 2015
- Last appearance: Unbreakable Kimmy Schmidt: Kimmy vs. the Reverend (Special); May 12, 2020
- Created by: Tina Fey
- Portrayed by: Carol Kane

In-universe information
- Gender: Female
- Occupation: Landlady (former); Drug lord (alternate timeline); Gang leader (alternate timeline); Metropolitan Transportation Authority announcer
- Significant other: Roland Peacock (husband; deceased); Artie Goodman (boyfriend; deceased); Robert "Bobby" Durst (crush/ex-boyfriend)
- Children: Unnamed child
- Relatives: Unnamed mother Unnamed father
- Alma mater: SUNY Old Paltz

Lillian Dolomite Kaushtupper is a fictional character on the Netflix original series Unbreakable Kimmy Schmidt, portrayed by Carol Kane. She is Kimmy Schmidt (Ellie Kemper) and Titus Andromedon's (Titus Burgess) odd landlady and upstairs neighbor. She first met Titus at Pawn Werlt when he was going to sell his Barbies and leave New York; she offered him an apartment and several months of free rent.

Kane has described her character as having "a passionate, checkered past, and hopefully a passionate, checkered future.” On playing Lillian, Kane states that due to the quality of the writing of series creators Tina Fey and Robert Carlock, "that basically if I can just remember what I’m supposed to say, it will come out OK." The scene where Lillian and Jacqueline White (Jane Krakowski) switch clothes was Kane's favorite of season 3. According to Tina Nigro, the series' costume designer, Lillian's outfits requires the least amount of effort out of the four main characters, mainly consisting of "a lot of vintage." Matt Melis of Consequence of Sound identifies Lillian's "doubl[ing] down on the MAGA approach in order to win her election" in season 3 as an example of the series combining the insular world of East Dogmouth with events of the wider country.

== Biography ==
The Kaushtupper family spent centuries hopping from one European country to another fleeing persecution for engaging in bestiality with cows. Once in New York, her family made a living as a "living diorama in the tenement museum." Her parents are still alive and work at Greenwood Cemetery. An uncle of hers talked about the weather every nine minutes due to a mental illness; he was the closest thing her family had to a radio. Aquarius is her zodiac sign. In high school, her career aptitude test said she should be an unlicensed barber or a police informant; she claims to be both. She is also a drug lookout and a legal summons server. She models nude twice a week for what she is "pretty sure is an art class." In the 1970s, she spent time as a standup comedian. She claims that Cindy Sherman does not exist; the famed photographer is merely a persona of herself that she created. For college, she went to SUNY Old Paltz. She had spent her life on the island of Manhattan until leaving it for the first time in the season 1 finale. However, she later says that she attended a summer camp on Roosevelt Island as a child. Waiting for the Second Avenue Subway to open, she lived in an apartment in Murray Hill. Sometime in the 1970s, she gave up waiting for the subway line to open and relocated to East Dogmouth. In "Kimmy Drives a Car!" she says to Titus "you think I'm crazy just because they named that disorder after me;" it would most likely be a mental disorder. She claims that there is a "gigantic furry monster" living in the neighborhood that only she can see. A roach that crawled out of a dictionary once bit her; she believes it increased her knowledge. Pizza Rat's parents were introduced to each other by her.

== Relationships ==
Her late husband Roland (Kenan Thompson), a musician, proposed to her at Mabel's Soul Food Restaurant. In September of 1977, she accidentally shot Roland in the face, killing him, having mistaken him for an intruder. It is implied that Roland's bones are still somewhere in the apartment building. In order to cash his disability checks, she dresses up in his clothes.

Robert "Bobby" Durst (Fred Armisen) was her first love. The two of them met at a summer camp on Roosevelt Island when she was 12 in 1964; she was his first alibi. This would make her born in 1952, meaning she is the same age as her actress Carol Kane. They begin dating again in the season 2 premiere. She breaks up with him in the season 3 premiere because he is the son of the biggest real estate developer in New York and she is running for city council on an anti-gentrification platform.

Artie Goodman (Peter Riegert) is the owner of the Big Naturals chain of grocery stores. When the two first meet they are rivals, as Lillian uses her position as city council member to oppose the construction of a Big Naturals in her district. They begin dating at the end of "Kimmy Learns About the Weather." She breaks up with him in the season 3 finale because he refuses to use his wealth to skip ahead on the heart donor line, a plan she approves of because there would only be ferret hearts left for Rudy Giuliani. However, they must have gotten back together, for Lillian is with him when he dies during their trip to Scandinavia. In Artie's will, he names Lillian in charge of his spoiled daughter Sheba's (Busy Philipps) trust fund.

Her wallet contains photographs of all the Asian men she's slept with. She has a pact with Titus that if they are both still single at the age of 40 then they will kill each other. In 1989, she played seven minutes in heaven after switching soups on Bill Cosby.

== Political views and lifestyle ==
Lillian's bête noire is the gentrification of her neighborhood. To prevent construction of a new apartment building in her neighborhood, she handcuffs herself to a bulldozer at the construction site. The stunt fails because the way she is handcuffed to the bulldozer does not actually prevent it from being operated. However, a video of it does go viral, and she is approached by the Interborough Society for Urban Settlement and urged to run for city council. She is elected because Kimmy is the only registered voter in East Dogmouth. However, the measure is still passed because all the other city council members vote for it. To prevent a vote on approving a Big Naturals in the district, she resorts to filibustering, peeing in a bucket during it. The Big Naturals is approved, but Lillian becomes community liaison for the project.

Back in the "old days," the longest word she knew was "friggingiuliani." She claims to have broken into the Federal Reserve Bank wearing nothing but "OPEC" written on herself in pigs' blood. There is a cop's bullet lodged in her chest. She claims that all of her possessions are things she looted in the blackout of 1977, and that she started the 2003 blackout just because she "needed a new pair of shoes." However, she later says that she likes to follow raccoons back to their nests in order to steal all the stuff they collect. She usually does not wear underwear. After the Lufthansa heist, she sanded off all her fingerprints. She has a hammer that she considers her bus pass. Al Sharpton once called her "an embarrassment to honkeydom." According to her, "yankee" is an old-fashioned term for a subway masturbator. While living in Murray Hill, she used a plastic cup with Reggie Jackson on it as a toilet. Before a sinkhole in her neighborhood was filled in, she used it as a toilet whenever she had a man over at her apartment, but only for defecating. She has the ability to tell time based on the status of her 18-hour bra (despite the fact that she claims to not buy bras). She has disposed of at least two bodies (and had fun doing so).
