= La Sabina =

1979 drama film

- Theatrical release poster
- Directed by: José Luis Borau
- Screenplay by: José Luis Borau
- Starring: Ángela Molina; Jon Finch; Harriet Andersson; Simon Ward; Ovidi Montllor; Carol Kane
- Cinematography: Lars Göran Björne
- Edited by: José Salcedo
- Music by: Paco de Lucía
- Production companies: El Imán; Svenska filminstitutet
- Distributed by: Alenda
- Release date: 21 November 1979 (Spain)
- Countries: Spain; Sweden
- Languages: Spanish; English

La Sabina is a 1979 fantasy drama film written and directed by José Luis Borau. The cast features Ángela Molina, Jon Finch, Harriet Anderson, Simon Ward, Ovidi Montllor, and Carol Kane. It is a Spanish-Swedish co-production.

== Plot ==
Set in the Andalusian village of Jarros in the late 1970s, the plot follows an English author who moves to Spain to write a biography about English Romantic poet Hyatt, who went missing in the aforementioned village of the Serranía de Ronda. In the village, he heards about the myth of La Sabina, a she-dragon who, according to tradition, lures her victims and devours them. Likewise he falls for local woman Pepa, who has a retarded brother, Manolín.

== Cast ==
- Ángela Molina as Pepa
- Jon Finch as Michael
- Simon Ward as Philip
- Harriet Andersson as Monica
- Carol Kane as Daisy
- Ovidi Montllor as Manolín
- Fernando Sánchez Polack as Félix
- Francisco Sánchez as Antonio

== Production ==
Shooting locations included the Cueva del Gato. In an retrospective interview tackling the cast, Borau stated that he was only satisfied by the work of Ángela Molina, Carol Kane and Ovidi Montllor.

== Release ==
The film was released theatrically in Spain on 21 November 1979.

== Themes ==
In the film's depiction of the monstrous-feminine, the female body is feared as castrator, rather than as castrated.

== Reception ==
Jesús Fernández Santos of El País observed that Molina's "artistry and instinct bring a proper scope to the scenes in which she stars".

== Accolades ==
Year	Award	Category	Nominee(s)	Result	Ref.
1980	35th CEC Awards	Best Director	José Luis Borau	Won	
1980	35th CEC Awards	Best Supporting Actress	Carol Kane	Won	

== See also ==
- List of Spanish films of 1979
