= Aspen Vincent =

American Broadway actress and singer (born 1979)

Aspen Weber
- Born: Aspen Miller; June 5, 1979 (age 47)
- Genres: Rock, pop
- Occupations: Singer, voice actor

Aspen Weber (née Miller, born June 5, 1979) is an American voice over actress and singer.

== Early life and education ==
A native of Pacific Beach, San Diego, she started doing theater at the age of nine, and would also perform with the Christian Community Theater and Starlight Musical Theatre, as well as being called to the Sydmonton Festival. Weber enrolled at Chapman University to study musical therapy, dropping out at the third year due to many job offers.

== Acting career ==
As a voice actress, she played the role of Dodie Bishop in Nickelodeon's Emmy-nominated As Told by Ginger, Alice in the Rugrats episode "Hurricane Alice", Amanda Payne in the pilot for Constant Payne, and did the voices of three different characters in the PC game EverQuest II. Weber sang the National Anthem for the L.A. Lakers, the Mighty Ducks of Anaheim, and the San Diego Chargers and performed in an a cappella group called Groove 66 at Disney California Adventure Park.

Early in her professional career, she was a regular in the recording studio, recording jingles and commercials, as well as providing background vocals for Disney on Ice. Weber spent 2004-2005 in Las Vegas, performing nightly at the Paris Las Vegas as the female lead "Scaramouche" in the rock musical We Will Rock You, where she met guitarist Paul Crook, who would recommend her for Meat Loaf's Neverland Express after Patti Russo left the band. Following auditions, Weber would tour with Meat Loaf as his duet partner and backup vocalist on the Seize the Night tour, from September 2006 through October 2007.

Weber also toured as part of the ensemble cast of Dirty Dancing in America from September 2008 through January 2009, and would later be a swing in the Broadway production of American Idiot, a show featuring songs of the popular band Green Day, from March 2010 through March 2011. Afterwards, she starred in the 2011 staging of Sleeping Beauty Wakes at both the McCarter Theatre in Princeton, New Jersey, and the La Jolla Playhouse in San Diego, California. Weber currently works as a voice over artist and vocal coach.

== Personal life ==
Aspen was married to Tony Vincent from 2008-2020, and they have two children: a daughter born in 2012 and a son born in 2018. They are divorced as of 2020 and both living in Nashville, Tennessee. Aspen remarried in 2025.
