= List of As Told by Ginger episodes =

As Told by Ginger is an American animated series that ran from October 25, 2000, to November 14, 2006. The series ended production in 2004, and by 2005 the series had fully aired on international versions of Nickelodeon in other countries, while in the United States the series was taken off Nickelodeon's schedule in 2004 during the third season. The show continued airing on Nicktoons from November 2004 to November 2006.

Six episodes from the third season remained unaired in the United States as of late 2006. After a decade, four of the unaired episodes made their television debut in the United States on TeenNick's NickRewind block, "The Splat", in late October 2016. Two episodes from the third season remained unaired in the United States after late 2016 (although the series finale, The Wedding Frame, was previously released direct-to-video in region 1 in November 2004) – both of these episodes were released on Paramount+ in January 2021.

== Series overview ==
Season	Episodes		Originally released		
Season	Episodes		First released	Last released	Network
Pilot			October 9, 2015		TeenNick
1	20		October 25, 2000	December 10, 2001	Nickelodeon
2	20		February 11, 2002	June 29, 2003	Nickelodeon
3	20	12	August 9, 2003	July 4, 2004	Nickelodeon
3	20	2	November 24, 2004	November 14, 2006	Nicktoons

== Episodes ==
=== Pilot (1998) ===
Title	Directed by	Written by	Original release date	Prod. code
"The Party"	Jim Duffy	Story by : Emily Kapnek & Kate Boutilier; Teleplay by : Kate Boutilier; Storyboarded by : Rudi Berden, Louie Del Carmen & Kahee Yum	October 9, 2015	100
Ginger is invited to Courtney's party, but there is one problem: she has to watch Carl. She takes Carl to the party and ties him up with a hose in the backyard. In the party, the kids play spin the bottle. Ginger spins and it lands on her crush, Ian Richton. Just before they are about to kiss, Blake, Courtney's younger brother, comes in wearing only his underwear and ruins the party. Ian sneaks Ginger a kiss anyway. Meanwhile, Dodie and Macie have their own party at Dodie's house. Note: This episode made its TV premiere on Friday, October 9, 2015, on The Splat. It was originally produced in 1998. This episode was released on the Far from Home DVD on Tuesday, April 5, 2005, 10 years before its TV premiere. In this episode, Blake Gripling was voiced by Tara Strong.

=== Season 1 (2000–01) ===
No. overall	No. in season	Title	Directed by	Written by	Original release date	Prod. code
1	1	"Ginger the Juvey"	Sylvia Keulen	Written by : Emily Kapnek; Storyboarded by : Michael Daedalus Kenny, Darin McGowan and Pablo Solis	October 25, 2000	101
Ginger is invited to Courtney's birthday party but does not know what to get her. Miranda tells her that stealing the "ENTER" sign from the bank would be the perfect gift. Ginger, Dodie, Macie, and Darren agree to do it, but Miranda calls her father, Officer Killgallen, and reports the theft. Meanwhile, Blake steals Carl's most prized possession: his petrified eyeball. Note: This episode is available on DVD.
2	2	"Carl and Maude"	Cathy Malkasian	Written by : Emily Kapnek; Storyboarded by : Robert Goodin, Jason Park and Sean Pendergrass	November 1, 2000	102
Courtney invites herself to Ginger's house for dinner. Carl meets an elderly prankster, Maude, at the retirement home and invites her to dinner the same night. Hoodsey is jealous because Carl is spending so much time with Maude and he has changed since he met her. While Ginger tries to pretend Maude is her grandmother, Carl plans on proposing to her. Maude passes away during dinner.
3	3	"Stealing First"	Carol Millican	Written by : Emily Kapnek; Storyboarded by : Rudi Berden, Karen Ciraulo and Monica Tomova	November 8, 2000	103
Ginger is afraid to go on the class ski trip because she cannot ski. Courtney bets Miranda that she can get the foreign exchange student, Jean-Pierre, to kiss Ginger on the chair lift. Meanwhile, Carl and Hoodsey plan to break the world record for the longest time spent stuck on a ski lift. When the chair lift stops, Jean-Pierre tries to kiss Ginger, but she falls off and discovers she can ski, but for a price: she ends up breaking Darren's leg. Note: This episode is available on DVD.
4	4	"Sleep on It"	Frank Marino	Story by : Emily Kapnek, Evan M. Katz & Kate Boutilier; Teleplay by : Evan M. Katz & Kate Boutilier; Storyboarded by : Wendy Grieb, Gabi Payn and Joseph Scott	November 15, 2000	104
Courtney overhears Ginger talking about a slumber party and decides to throw her own, despite not knowing how to. Miranda and Mipsy try to make it look like Ginger wet the bed. Meanwhile, Blake invites Carl to his own sleepover, but Carl gets grounded, so he sends Hoodsey with a mini video camera to try to steal back the petrified eyeball.
5	5	"Of Lice and Friends"	Ron Noble	Story by : Emily Kapnek & Sheila M. Anthony; Teleplay by : Sheila M. Anthony; Storyboarded by : Jennifer Coyle, Max Martinez and Darin McGowan	November 22, 2000	105
There is a lice outbreak at Lucky Jr. High as Dodie becomes the school announcer. Ginger feels that Dodie goes overboard with her job when Dodie turns it into a gossip column. Dodie finds the list of kids who were found to have lice during the inspection and feels that the other students have the right to know so they can avoid getting lice, one of which is Courtney. Ginger is able to stop her from reading most of the list over the announcements. Meanwhile, Carl and Hoodsey sabotage Blake's experiment to give flies multi-colored wings.
6	6	"Dare I, Darren?"	Dean Criswell	Written by : Emily Kapnek; Storyboarded by : Wendy Grieb, Michael Daedalus Kenny, Pablo Solis and Alan Zegler	December 3, 2000	106
Ginger begins to see Darren as more than a friend after Miranda suggests they would make a cute couple. She and he go on a date to the movies, which Darren thinks is just a friendly outing. Meanwhile, Blake has his tonsils removed. Note: This episode is available on DVD.
7	7	"Hello Stranger"	Mark Risley	Written by : Emily Kapnek; Storyboarded by : Robert Goodin, Jason Park and Sean Pendergrass	December 10, 2000	107
Ginger receives a 6th grade graduation card from her father and invites him to a poetry reading she is doing at school. He never calls back, but she assumes he will come and is crushed when he does not. Meanwhile, Lois accidentally drinks Carl's dehydrated snake potion that looked like lemonade and must stay in the hospital. Carl accompanies her when he is bitten by a monkey and starts acting like one, too. Note: This episode was nominated for an Emmy Award (Outstanding Program Less Than One Hour) in 2001.
8	8	"Cry Wolf"	Carol Millican	Story by : Emily Kapnek & Alice Miller; Teleplay by : Alice Miller; Storyboarded by : Rudi Berden, Karen Ciraulo and Monica Tomova	January 14, 2001	108
During a routine fire drill, Dodie accidentally tells Miranda that Ginger is not allowed to shave her legs. Miranda uses this as blackmail to get Ginger to do her homework and, of course, to stay away from Courtney. Meanwhile, Carl puts together an all-hair ensemble and becomes Wolf Boy.
9	9	"The Right Stuff"	Frank Marino	Story by : Sarah Jane Cunningham & Eryk Casemiro; Teleplay by : Eryk Casemiro; Storyboarded by : Gabi Payn, Joseph Scott and Alan Zegler	January 21, 2001	109
Macie and Courtney enter a high school-level French class. Courtney uses the class as an opportunity to get closer to Darren's older brother, Will. Macie is unwillingly volunteered to host a pool party. Two girls from the class, Chantal and Andrea, plan to pull the string on the top half of Courtney's bikini and embarrass her in front of Will. Macie finds out and she, Ginger, Dodie, and Darren are able to stop it. Meanwhile, Carl and Hoodsey try to get some Albert Einstein DNA for a school science fair project.
10	10	"Kiss and Make-up"	Ron Noble	Story by : Emily Kapnek & David Regal; Teleplay by : David Regal & Emily Kapnek; Storyboarded by : Jennifer Coyle, Max Martinez and Darin McGowan	January 28, 2001	110
After Lois tells Ginger she cannot wear make-up for her school picture, she, Dodie, and Macie create "fake-up". Meanwhile, Carl and Hoodsey ride with the garbage man, Dwane, to Protected Pines, the Griplings' neighborhood, where they find Blake's baby blanket.
11	11	"The 'A' Ticket"	Dean Criswell	Story by : Emily Kapnek & Sheila M. Anthony; Teleplay by : Sheila M. Anthony; Storyboarded by : Michael Daedalus Kenny, Kyle Menke and Pablo Solis	February 4, 2001	111
Ginger is partnered up with Ian Richton for science, which he seemed happy about. Ginger thinks he was showing signs of affection for her, but Darren finds out that he is just using Ginger to get an A so he can stay on the soccer team. Meanwhile, Carl, Hoodsey, and Brandon compete for a glockenspiel solo in front of the town eccentric.
12	12	"Come Back, Little Seal Girl"	Carol Millican	Story by : Emily Kapnek, Sarah Jane Cunningham & Suzie Villandry; Teleplay by : Sarah Jane Cunningham, Suzie Villandry & Emily Kapnek; Storyboarded by : Robert Goodin, Jason Park and Sean Pendergrass	February 11, 2001	112
Ginger, Dodie, and Macie agree on doing a skit devoted to The Little Seal Girl, their childhood hero, for the school talent show. Ginger and Dodie, however, quickly become convinced that it is too juvenile and back-out. Macie feels betrayed and goes solo. Meanwhile, Carl touches a mummified hand of his teacher's that is supposedly cursed.
13	13	"Blizzard Conditions"	Ron Noble	Written by : Eryk Casemiro; Storyboarded by : Rudi Berden, Robert Goodin and Jeffrey Hua	February 25, 2001	114
A snow storm hits Sheltered Shrubs as Ginger, Dodie, and Macie work on their survival story projects. They finally get their topic when they have to save Courtney, Blake, and Winston from their limo which is buried in snow. Meanwhile, Carl and Hoodsey watch a dentist's dog in exchange for a cuspidor (which is what you spit into at the dentist's).
14	14	"Déjà Who?"	Dean Criswell	Story by : Emily Kapnek & Sheila M. Anthony; Teleplay by : Sheila M. Anthony; Storyboarded by : Karen Ciraulo, Joseph Scott and Alan Zegler	March 4, 2001	115
Courtney has an allergic reaction to the mystery meat at lunch on the same week that she is supposed escort the Senator's son to school and convince him to enroll there. She gets Ginger to pretend she is Courtney. Talking, walking, dressing, and socializing just as Courtney does are only some of the things expected of her. Dodie and Macie become jealous after Ginger gets too caught up in her new inner circle of friends and leaves them behind. Since Ginger is Courtney, Ginger is marked absent for the whole week, which frustrates Lois. Hoodsey has a bad fall and gets amnesia. He becomes "Rob" and does not seem to want to rekindle his friendship with Carl and becomes friends with Brandon, much to the pleasure of Mrs. Bishop.
15	15	"Piece of My Heart"	Frank Marino & Joseph Scott	Story by : Emily Kapnek & Rain Austin Chandler; Teleplay by : Rain Austin Chandler & Sheila M. Anthony; Storyboarded by : Max Martinez, Darin McGowan and Sean Pendergrass	April 29, 2001	117
Hoodsey invites Macie to the dance disguised as a "mystery man" because he has a crush on her. Meanwhile, Darren thinks that Courtney invited him to the dance, but she really invited his older brother, Will. Also, Carl and Blake team up to retrieve a pig's heart so they can save a cow's life.
16–18	16–18	"Season of Caprice"	Mark Risley (part 1), Ron Noble (part 2) & Dean Criswell (part 3)	Story by : Emily Kapnek; Teleplay by : Sheila M. Anthony & Emily Kapnek; Storyboarded by : Michael Daedalus Kenny and Pablo Solis (part 1) & Written by : Emily Kapnek; Storyboarded by : Rudi Berden, Robert Goodin, Jeffrey Hua, Karen Ciraulo, Joseph Scott and Alan Zegler (part 2 & 3)	July 7, 2001	118–120
It is summer vacation, and Ginger, Dodie, and Macie take their annual trip to Camp Caprice, an all-girls camp; only this time, Courtney accompanies them in an attempt to prove to Miranda that she is not high maintenance. Ginger falls in love with Sasha, a boy working at Camp Caprice. Meanwhile, across the lake at a military camp run by Miranda's father, Miranda and Darren bond over its harsh conditions and attempt to escape. Back in Sheltered Shrubs, Carl and Hoodsey start a house-keeping service as a cover-up for their search for the town's mysterious dog-napper. Note: This episode was alternatively titled "Summer at Camp Caprice".
19	19	"I Spy a Witch"	Frank Marino	Written by : Eryk Casemiro; Storyboarded by : Rudi Berden, Karen Ciraulo and Alan Zegler	October 26, 2001	113
Ginger is framed for vandalizing the school statue and is denied her part as lead in the school musical, when it was really Miranda and Mipsy! Carl is having trouble coming up with a prank that is good enough to scare his mom for Halloween, so he calls Maude back from the dead to help.
20	20	"An "Even Steven" Holiday Special"	Carol Millican	Written by : Emily Kapnek; Storyboarded by : Jennifer Coyle, Gabi Payn and Monica Tomova	December 10, 2001	116
Ginger discovers that she is one-fourth Jewish. She decides to celebrate with a Hanukkah party and turns her back on Dodie's Christmas party, which upsets Dodie. She then decides to throw a party as an "even steven" holiday party. Meanwhile, Hoodsey finds out that the reason Carl does not believe in Santa Claus is because he used to wish that his father would come home for Christmas, and he never did. Hoodsey tells a street corner Santa, who is really Jonas, about this and Jonas decides to pay his family a visit.

=== Season 2 (2002–03) ===
No. overall	No. in season	Title	Directed by	Written by	Original release date	Prod. code
21	1	"Never Can Say Goodbye"	Mark Risley	Written by : Emily Kapnek; Storyboarded by : Tron Mai, Max Martinez and Darin McGowan	February 11, 2002	201
Darren gets his headgear removed and becomes instantly popular overnight. Ginger thinks she may have feelings for him, but she is not the only one. Darren and Miranda start dating. Ginger learns from a talk show that the best thing to do is to give him the cold shoulder, which she does. Meanwhile, Brandon's pet monkey, Mr. Licorice, goes missing and he calls on Carl and Hoodsey to search for him.
22	2	"Gym Class Confidential"	Dean Criswell	Written by : Eryk Casemiro; Storyboarded by : Robert Goodin, Gabi Payn and Alan Zegler	February 17, 2002	202
The girls' gym class has to watch a film about puberty. Macie is terrified and Ginger feels guilty because she thinks that this will tear their friendship apart. Meanwhile, Hoodsey is afraid to take showers in gym class because he does not want to get naked in front of other people, all-the-while Carl is trying to break a record for the dirtiest person.
23	3	"Fast Reputation"	Joseph Scott	Written by : Barbara Schwartz & Sheila M. Anthony; Storyboarded by : Rudi Berden, Jeffrey Hua and Frank Jen	February 24, 2002	203
After being called a "nice" girl for too long, Ginger, along with Dodie and Macie, crash a high school party. There, she runs into a "cool guy" named Jake. Rumors spread that Ginger and Jake made out and her reputation is ruined. Meanwhile, Carl and Hoodsey start their own food cart business featuring dishes with gross-out names.
24	4	"The Nurses' Strike"	Michael Dædalus Kenny	Written by : Sheila M. Anthony; Storyboarded by : Karen Ciraulo, Sean Pendergrass and Monica Tomova	March 10, 2002	204
Lois is out of work because of the nurses' strike. She decides to run her own cleaning business which just so happens to embarrass Ginger. But since she needs the money for a school trip, Ginger joins her mother and finds that the mother-daughter time is actually fun. Miranda eventually finds out and has Courtney hire Lois to clean her house to embarrass Ginger. Meanwhile, Carl and Hoodsey try to train Principal Milty's dog, The Duchess, but only Hoodsey can truly get through to her.
25	5	"Trouble in Gal Pal Land"	Ron Noble	Written by : Sheila M. Anthony; Storyboarded by : Tron Mai, Max Martinez, Eric Molinsky and Ray Smyth	March 17, 2002	205
Courtney and Miranda get into an argument in gym class and Courtney has Miranda exiled from the group. When Ginger sticks up for Miranda in front of everyone, Miranda feels that she owes Ginger and becomes her new best friend. However, Miranda becomes pushy, inconsiderate, and downright annoying to Ginger, Dodie, Macie and Darren. Meanwhile, Hoodsey poses as a street urchin to help Mrs. Gripling win the election of president of the charity committee and her country club.
26	6	"Sibling Revile-ry"	Anthony Bell	Written by : Erin Ehrlich; Storyboarded by : Robert Goodin, Darin McGowan and Gabi Payn	March 24, 2002	206
Ginger is elected onto the student council. She creates a "big brother/sister" program in which if a kid gets in trouble, they will not be sent to detention, they will have an older role model to "correct" them. But as her program spreads, students purposely get in trouble so they can be paired up with cool people from the high school. The program reaches the elementary school. At the same time Carl damages the school's septic tank. He is assigned a military-style big brother who wants to make Carl into a perfect angel.
27	7	"Losing Nana Bishop"	Dean Criswell	Written by : Eryk Casemiro; Storyboarded by : Rudi Berden, Frank Jen and Alan Zegler	March 31, 2002	207
Dodie and Hoodsey's grandmother passes away. Mrs. Bishop wants Hoodsey to speak at the funeral, but he does not know what to say since he was not as close to her as Dodie was. The experience inspires Ginger to learn more about her grandmother. She talks to her father and watches old home movies only to learn that she and her grandmother had a special bond. Meanwhile, Carl and Hoodsey accidentally lock themselves in shackles and an iron mask when they lose the key.
28	8	"TGIF"	Joseph Scott	Written by : Barbara Schwartz; Teleplay by : Rafi Simon & Sheila M. Anthony; Storyboarded by : Karen Ciraulo, Jeffrey Hua, Sean Pendergrass and Monica Tomova	April 7, 2002	208
On Friday the 13th, Ginger's house is discovered as having a deadly mold that attracts a lot of media attention. When Lois and Carl make the best of a bad situation by "putting their own spin on it" to the press, Ginger refuses to stay with them at the Bishops' and stays with Courtney instead. Carl is disappointed when Hoodsey does not want to help him have the unluckiest experience ever.
29	9	"Lunatic Lake"	Michael Dædalus Kenny	Written by : Eryk Casemiro; Storyboarded by : Tron Mai, Max Martinez and Eric Molinsky	April 14, 2002	209
Macie and Ginger are nervous about vacationing with Dodie's family to Loon Lake because they feel Mrs. Bishop is a little intense. Carl and Hoodsey plan to make a movie based on an escaped mental patient that is believed to be hiding in the Loon Lake area. When they sneak out of the cabin in the middle of the night, Joann and the girls go looking for them, only to run into the real lunatic. Note: This episode was nominated for an Emmy Award (Outstanding Animated Program Less Than One Hour) in 2002.
30	10	"April's Fools"	Anthony Bell	Story by : Emily Kapnek & Vera Duffy; Teleplay by : Vera Duffy; Storyboarded by : Rudi Berden, Frank Jen, Dave Williams and Alan Zegler	April 21, 2002	210
Ginger decided to play an April Fools joke on Dodie by forging a love note from the weirdest guy in school. Dodie admits she really likes the guy, Dustin, and Dustin admits to really liking Macie. Carl fools Blake into thinking that he sold his tonsils (which he stole in "Dare I, Darren?"). But everything goes wrong when they realize that Joann accidentally threw the tonsils bottle away.
31	11	"Ms. Foutley's Boys"	Ron Noble	Written by : Emily Kapnek; Storyboarded by : Robert Goodin, Darin McGowan, Gabi Payn and Ray Smyth	April 28, 2002	211
Lois starts to date Buzz, the plumber that helped fix the mold problem in "TGIF". Shortly after, he and his three sons are living in Lois' house as Buzz fixes everything without asking, giving it a "man's touch". Ginger feels caught between her intolerance of Buzz and the fact that she does not want her mom to end up alone. Meanwhile, Carl uses Buzz's three sons as guinea pigs for his latest inventions.
32	12	"Love with a Proper Transfer Student"	Dean Criswell	Story by : Emily Kapnek, Sheila M. Anthony & Erin Ehrlich; Teleplay by : Erin Ehrlich; Storyboarded by : Karen Ciraulo, Jeffrey Hua and Monica Tomova	May 5, 2002	212
Dodie signs up for the school musical in hopes that she will get the lead part so that she could kiss Joaquin, the new student. Ginger also has a crush on Joaquin and when she lands the role as the lead, an innocent stage kiss turns into a passionate one, causing tension between Dodie and Ginger. Meanwhile, Carl and Hoodsey concoct a love potion that they think Ginger drank, making them responsible for the love triangle. It turns out, Lois was the one that drank the potion and it did not have any effect.
33	13	"Family Therapy"	Joseph Scott	Story by : Sheila M. Anthony & Paul Greenberg; Teleplay by : Paul Greenberg; Storyboarded by : Tron Mai, Max Martinez, Eric Molinsky and Sean Pendergrass	May 12, 2002	213
Macie's parents forget about her thirteenth birthday. When Ginger tells Bobby and Bobbie Lightfoot, they feel extremely guilty and ensure that they make it up to Macie. They begin to treat her like a four-year-old, showering her with baby toys and hosting her birthday party at a petting zoo. At the end, Macie decides that while she has had fun catching up on lost childhood, she is a teenager now and her parents should treat her as such. Meanwhile, Carl hides in fear from an escaped naked mole-rat that crawled up his pants leg, but later he decides to find it, losing his fear when he discovers that it is even more frightened of him.
34	14	"New Girl in Town"	Michael Dædalus Kenny	Written by : Sheila M. Anthony; Storyboarded by : Robert Goodin and Darin McGowan	May 19, 2002	214
The new girl in school, Laetitia Bowers, is not welcomed with open arms. Her gothic appearance and the fact that she carried around a fake skull only helped people circulate the rumor that the reason she and her father, who is a mortician, left town was because Mr. Bowers accidentally embalmed someone who was still alive. Ginger sees through these lies and promises Laetitia she can get the "in" crowd to come to her party. Meanwhile, Carl and Hoodsey are guilted into staying at Brandon's birthday party because they are the only ones there and Brandon's parents think he is popular.
35	15	"Ginger's Solo"	Ron Noble	Story by : Emily Kapnek & Erin Ehrlich; Teleplay by : Erin Ehrlich; Storyboarded by : Rudi Berden, Robert Goodin, Frank Jen and Alan Zegler	June 2, 2002	215
The Lucky Jr. High band is going to perform at Sasha's school in Heathered Hills. Ginger takes this opportunity to go with the band, playing the triangle in the performance. However, Sasha reveals that he had gotten back together with his ex-girlfriend, Clover. Meanwhile, Carl tries to raise money by fooling people into thinking he is a psychic.
36	16	"Mommie Nearest"	Anthony Bell	Written by : Sheila M. Anthony; Storyboarded by : John Eddings, Jeffrey Hua and Monica Tomova	June 9, 2002	216
Courtney's mother has to stay in the hospital after a bad face lift, causing Courtney to find comfort in Lois. Ginger becomes jealous of Lois and Courtney's bond, especially when Courtney has to stay in their house for a few days. Meanwhile, Dr. Dave convinces Carl to wear a fake chin before going into surgery to make his real one larger.
37	17	"And She Was Gone"	Mark Risley	Written by : Emily Kapnek; Storyboarded by : Jeffrey Hua, Tron Mai, Max Martinez, Darin McGowan, Eric Molinsky, Monica Tomova and Alan Zegler	June 16, 2002	217
Ginger writes a poem about a girl who wants to disappear for a competition. When Ms. Zorski reads it, she believes Ginger is suicidally depressed and makes her see the school psychologist. Meanwhile, Carl tests his vanishing powder on Noelle Sussman, who he thinks is a nobody. But when Noelle really does disappear, Carl deeply regrets it. Note: This episode was nominated for an Emmy Award (Outstanding Animated Program Less Than One Hour).
38	18	"No Hope for Courtney"	Dean Criswell	Story by : Emily Kapnek & Laura McCreary; Teleplay by : Laura McCreary; Storyboarded by : Tron Mai, Eric Molinsky and Sean Pendergrass	June 23, 2002	218
Ginger helps a common geek, Hope Rogers, find confidence. Unfortunately, this confidence caused her to change her look and take over Courtney's position as the most popular girl in school. As all of Courtney's group has turned on her, Courtney becomes a hopeless wreck. Meanwhile, Mrs. Gordon, tired of Carl's practical jokes, retires, upsetting him. Eventually he begs Mrs. Gordon to come back, and she agrees but she passes away shortly after. This episode was dedicated to Kathleen Freeman, the voice of Mrs. Gordon, who died of lung cancer at age 82 on August 23, 2001.
39	19	"Next Question"	Joseph Scott	Written by : Eryk Casemiro; Storyboarded by : Max Martinez, Darin McGowan, Gabi Payn and Rafael Zentil	June 22, 2003	219
Ginger develops a crush on her quiz team teacher, Mr. Gardner, and is convinced by Dodie that he likes her back. Ginger ends up embarrassing herself in front of everyone by asking Mr. Gardner out in the middle of a televised quiz competition. Meanwhile, Carl and Hoodsey try to free the city groundhog so they use the situation for product endorsement.
40	20	"Driven to Extremes"	Michael Dædalus Kenny	Story by : Nate Eddinger & Erin Ehrlich; Teleplay by : Erin Ehrlich; Storyboarded by : Rudi Berden, Robert Goodin and Frank Jen	June 29, 2003	220
A terribly strict substitute teacher comes Ms. Zorski's class, making everyone's lives miserable. Miranda arranges for the students to T.P. the substitute's house and ring the door bell, pelting her with eggs when she comes to answer. Ginger thinks this is too much and backs out. But when she becomes concerned for the substitute, she decides to put an end to her classmates' schemes. On Monday, Ginger makes her speech to the sub about her strictness, and unfortunately she gets detention as a result. Meanwhile, Carl offers to teach Mr. Licorice how to ride a motorcycle for a pet talent show.

=== Season 3 (2003–04; 2006; 2016; 2021) ===
- The first 10 episodes of this season aired on Nickelodeon from 2003 to 2004. After Nickelodeon ceased airing new episodes of the series, 2 previously unaired episodes aired on Nicktoons in 2004 and 2006. The show officially ended on November 14, 2006. In October 2016, TeenNick's nighttime block The Splat aired 4 previously unaired episodes. In January 2021, Paramount+ released all three seasons of the series, including "Battle of the Bands" and "The Wedding Frame", which have never aired in the United States before.

No. overall	No. in season	Title	Directed by	Written by	Original release date	Prod. code
41–43	1–3	"Far from Home" "Foutley's on Ice"	Michael Dædalus Kenny (part 1), Anthony Bell (part 2) & Joseph Scott (part 3)	Written by : Emily Kapnek; Storyboarded by : Curtis Cim, Jeffrey Hua, Tron Mai, Max Martinez, Darin McGowan, Eric Molinsky, Gabi Payn, Sean Pendergrass, Monica Tomova & Rossen Varbanov	August 9, 2003	301–303
Miranda and Mipsy pay off the board members at Avalanche Arts Academy (a private arts school) to accept Ginger for a semester term and later decide to have Ginger away for good. With Ginger out of the picture, Miranda and Mipsy figure they can get more attention from Courtney. When Ginger arrives at the school, Mipsy's cousin, Thea, has the job to make Ginger feel welcome and convince her to stay full time. Meanwhile, Darren starts to develop feelings for Ginger. Also, Courtney decides she needs to spend as much time with Dodie and Macie to try to soak up every last bit of Ginger, but her plans change when she discovers Miranda and Mipsy's scandal. Finally, Carl becomes jealous when he thinks Hoodsey and Noelle like each other while they enter Noelle in a freak show competition (because of her telekinetic powers). Note: This episode is available on DVD.
44	4	"Wicked Game"	Ron Noble	Written by : Emily Kapnek; Storyboarded by : Rudi Berden, Jeffrey Hua & Darin McGowan	August 30, 2003	304
Ginger returns from Avalanche Arts Academy. When she does, Dodie and Macie feel like they have been bumped down a spot as Ginger seems preoccupied with her boyfriend, Darren. Mipsy and Miranda are also unhappy with the situation because now Ginger ignores them, making it impossible for them to embarrass her. They talk Dodie and Macie into helping them break-up Ginger and Darren. Ginger eventually finds out about the plot, thanks to Courtney. Meanwhile, Noelle loses Carl to Polly Shuster in a bet. For an entire weekend, Carl has to play "Parrot World" with Polly. Blake takes pictures of Carl actually enjoying this game and plans to use them for blackmail.
45	5	"The Easter Ham"	Dean Criswell	Written by : Eryk Casemiro; Storyboarded by : Max Martinez, Sean Pendergrass & Monica Tomova	April 11, 2004	305
Lois and Joann fight over the last ham for Easter in the supermarket. Joann has to go to the hospital and she made the Foutleys off-limits to the Bishops. Ginger has to decide whether to throw Darren's birthday party without Dodie or not. Meanwhile, Carl, Brandon, and Hoodsey begin to sell Easter candy. When Brandon quits, Hoodsey takes over as the entertainer, but Joann's feud with the Foutleys complicates matters.
46	6	"About Face"	Anthony Bell	Written by : Emily Kapnek; Storyboarded by : John Eddings, Frank Jen & Tron Mai	May 23, 2004	306
Dodie's mother gets a job substitute-teaching at Dodie's school. Dodie feels betrayed when her mother begins to start hanging out with Courtney and the "in" crowd. Dodie later finds out that it may be a result of Joann being crowned "Missed Popularity" as a kid. Meanwhile, Dr. Dave plans on proposing to Lois, but the engagement ring gets stuck on Carl's finger. Blake uses this and the photos he took of Parrot World to ruin his relationship with Noelle. Also, Dr. Dave's mother comes to town and she and Lois do not make nice.
47–48	7–8	"Butterflies Are Free"	Michael Dædalus Kenny (part 1) & Ron Noble (part 2)	Written by : Eryk Casemiro & Emily Kapnek; Storyboarded by : Rudi Berden, Jennifer Coyle, Jeffrey Hua, Frank Jen, Tron Mai, Darin McGowan, Eric Molinsky & Joseph Scott	June 13, 2004	307–308
Ginger and her friends are graduating junior high school, and Ginger is asked to give a speech at graduation. She has trouble writing it, however, because it seems that she and her friends are being pulled in all different directions. Macie's new bandmate has his eye on her, Darren gets involved in football, and Dodie with cheerleading. Carl and Hoodsey and their classmates are graduating elementary school as well, and it comes up that Polly Shuster trick into putting Carl's petrified eyeball, Blake's tonsils, and Mr. Licorice's tooth into a time capsule.
49	9	"Heat Lightning"	Michael Dædalus Kenny	Written by : Eryk Casemiro; Storyboarded by : Aldin Baroza, Broni Likomanov, Michael Mullen & Joseph Scott	June 27, 2004	309
Ginger, Dodie, Macie, and Courtney return to Camp Caprice as counselors. Ginger begins to feel that she may not want Darren as a boyfriend, but Sasha instead. After a bad run-in with Sasha, Ginger realizes that she did not want to date him, she only wanted the feelings she had when she first met him. Meanwhile, Dr. Dave has to stay with Lois because his house is being fumigated, and it turns out that his mother has to stay there too. Carl and Hoodsey try to deal with the ongoing heat wave.
50	10	"Fair to Cloudy"	Andrei Svislotski	Written by : Kate Boutilier; Storyboarded by : Aldin Baroza, Mark Garcia & Monica Tomova	July 4, 2004	310
Ginger, Dodie, and Macie prepare for their annual trip to the county fair, only Ginger has one last-minute addition: Darren. To retaliate, Dodie invites Courtney along, too. Darren ends up thinking the whole thing is "lame" and Courtney has to examine every little thing. Meanwhile, Carl and Hoodsey try to free a two-headed horse at the fair. Note: This was the last episode to premiere on Nickelodeon in the United States.
51	11	"Ten Chairs"	Ron Noble	Written by : Eryk Casemiro; Storyboarded by : Dean Criswell, Frank Jen & Max Martinez	November 24, 2004 (Nicktoons)	317
Ginger decides to give the last open chair at the Thanksgiving table to her father, Jonas (which Lois does not know about and which does not sit well with Carl). Carl and Hoodsey purchase a turkey so they can set it free, only ruining the party.
52	12	"Stuff'll Kill Ya"	Mark Risley	Written by : Emily Kapnek; Storyboarded by : Frank Jen, Tron Mai, Bao Nguyen & Rafael Zentil	November 14, 2006 (Nicktoons)	311
Ginger's busy high school schedule leads her to count on a caffeine drink called the "Mocho Loco Frothinator" to keep her awake. This causes her to become extremely hyper, but she crashes and burns without more, making it an unhealthy addiction. Meanwhile, Carl's disregard for the rules make him think he has inhaled something deadly. However, it is only a fake story that his teacher creates as payback for his daughter's misfortune.
53	13	"Detention"	Ron Noble	Written by : Adam Cohen; Storyboarded by : Rudi Berden, Won Ki Cho, Dean Criswell, Bao Nguyen, Javier Secaduras	October 22, 2016 (TeenNick)	312
Ginger gets detention for sleeping in Ms. Zorski II's class (during "Stuff'll Kill Ya"), meaning she cannot attend Darren's football game. She knows he will be upset if she does not show up, so she asks Dodie to dress up as her to go to the game. Ginger also meets Orion in detention, and they become friends.
54	14	"Kiss Today Goodbye"	John Holmquist	Written by : Kate Boutilier; Storyboarded by : Frank Jen, Max Martinez & Rafael Zentil	October 22, 2016 (TeenNick)	313
While desperately trying to be accepted onto the pep squad, Dodie discovers that Darren has been secretly having a relationship with the head cheerleader, Simone. Dodie wants to tell Ginger, but does not want to risk her place on the squad by angering Simone. Not wanting to be responsible for their break-up, Dodie writes Darren a letter encouraging him to come clean with Ginger. Meanwhile, Carl and Lois go house hunting.
55	15	"A Lesson in Tightropes"	Mark Risley	Written by : Emily Kapnek; Storyboarded by : Aldin Baroza, Rudi Berden & Tron Mai	October 23, 2016 (TeenNick)	314
Darren finally decides to tell Ginger the truth, and he breaks up with her. She returns home where her friends try to comfort her, until she eventually cries herself to sleep. When her Mom comes to check on her, she finds Ginger unconscious due to an acute appendicitis attack and she is rushed to the hospital, where Dr. Dave saves her life by performing an emergency appendectomy. As she is recovering, many of her friends and family come to visit, including her father, Jonas. Carl becomes worried that their father's appearance will rekindle Lois's feelings for him and ruin her relationship with Dr. Dave. Meanwhile, Ginger reflects on her relationship with Darren and Orion comes to reveal his true feelings for her.
56	16	"Dodie's Big Break"	Michael Dædalus Kenny	Story by : Adam Cohen; Teleplay by : Sheila M. Anthony; Storyboarded by : Broni Likomanov, Jeff Scott & Joseph Scott	October 23, 2016 (TeenNick)	315
Ginger returns to school after her illness, and Dodie is promoted to the position of the pep squad's official "Gopher" mascot. While performing her routine, the cheerleaders fall out of their pyramid and end up landing on top of Dodie. She breaks her leg and the squad decides to console her by making her an official member of the squad. With her new cheerleader status, Dodie ends up ignoring Ginger and Macie, who are fed up with the whole thing. When they discover that Dodie has been lying about breaking her leg, they set out to trick Dodie into blowing her own cover in front of the squad. Meanwhile, Carl teams up with a real estate agent and becomes involved in selling houses.
57	17	"Battle of the Bands"	Andrei Svislotski	Written by : Adam Cohen; Storyboarded by : Michael Mullen, Javier Secaduras & Monica Tomova	January 12, 2021 (Paramount+)	316
When Ginger learns that the band program is being cut in order to pay for the football team's stain resistant uniforms, she becomes angry and decides to start a petition to bring the band back, claiming that she is doing it to help Macie. Darren, who wants to keep the uniforms, starts a campaign against Ginger to keep them. As the two groups fight it out over the issue, Ginger begins to realize that the real reason she is hanging on to her side of the argument is to get back at Darren. Carl, who made a promise to be good once he reached middle school, has been hearing voices in his head telling him to be bad. He and Hoodsey use a loophole in their pact to cause problems at the high school instead, and end up interfering with Ginger's plan to make a statement at the football game.
58–60	18–20	"The Wedding Frame"	Michael Dædalus Kenny (part 1), Ron Noble (part 2) & Mark Risley & Michael Dædalus Kenny (part 3)	Written by : Emily Kapnek &. Eryk Casemiro; Storyboarded by : Aldin Baroza, Dean Criswell, Mark Garcia, Frank Jen, Broni Likomanov, Tron Mai, Max Martinez, Bao Nguyen, Jeff Scott & Rafael Zentil	January 12, 2021 (Paramount+) November 24, 2004 (DVD & VHS)	318–320
Someone is trying to sabotage Lois and Dr. Dave's wedding, which Dr. Dave's mother is planning by hiring Nikki LaPorte to play the role of Dr. Dave's old girlfriend. As Ginger is helping her mother plan the wedding, she realizes she has commitment issues and begins to rethink her relationship with Orion and her old one with Darren. Carl and Hoodsey investigate the situation with Lois' wedding while Noelle does the same, on a much more accurate track. Also, Courtney's family loses all their fortune after Mr. Gripling is arrested. Note: These episodes were released in the United States on The Wedding Frame VHS and DVD on November 23, 2004.
