= As Told by Ginger =

American animated television series

- Genre: Teen drama
- Created by: Emily Kapnek
- Developed by: Kate Boutilier; Eryk Casemiro
- Directed by: Mark Risley
- Voices of: Melissa Disney; Kenny Blank; Jeannie Elias; Liz Georges; Jackie Harris; Aspen Vincent; Tress MacNeille; Cree Summer; Laraine Newman; Kath Soucie; Sandy Fox; Emily Kapnek; Adam Wylie
- Theme music composer: Jared Faber; Emily Kapnek
- Opening theme: "I'm in Between"
- Composer: Jared Faber
- Country of origin: United States
- Original language: English
- No. of seasons: 3
- No. of episodes: 60 (list of episodes)

Production
- Executive producers: Arlene Klasky; Gábor Csupó; Eryk Casemiro; Emily Kapnek
- Producers: Kate Boutilier (season 1); Maureen Iser (seasons 1–2); Susan Ward (season 3)
- Running time: 24 minutes
- Production company: Klasky Csupo

Original release
- Network: Nickelodeon
- Release: October 25, 2000 – July 4, 2004
- Network: Nicktoons
- Release: November 24, 2004 – November 14, 2006
- Network: TeenNick
- Release: October 22 – October 23, 2016
- Network: Paramount+
- Release: January 12, 2021

As Told by Ginger is an American animated teen drama television series created by Emily Kapnek and produced by Klasky Csupo for Nickelodeon. The series is set in the fictional town of Sheltered Shrubs and follows middle school (later high school) student Ginger Foutley and her friends as they navigate adolescence, friendships, family life, and the social hierarchy of school.

The series premiered on Nickelodeon on October 25, 2000, and concluded on July 4, 2004, with a total of 60 episodes over three seasons. Ten episodes were excluded from its initial run on Nickelodeon; these would be included in international re-runs, and were released sporadically in the United States between 2004 and 2021. It received three Primetime Emmy Award nominations for Outstanding Animated Program (for Programming Less Than One Hour). As Told by Ginger was widely praised for its serialized storytelling, character development, and realistic portrayal of adolescence. Unlike most animated children's series of its era, the characters aged over the course of the series, experienced lasting personal growth, and frequently changed outfits, reflecting Kapnek's goal of depicting adolescence with greater realism.

== Premise ==
=== Characters ===
The series centers on junior high school student Ginger Foutley. Alongside her close friends Darren Patterson, Dodie Bishop, and Macie Lightfoot, Ginger navigates adolescence while attempting to improve her social standing at school and dealing with the challenges of friendships, family, and growing up.

Although Ginger and her friends occupy the lower end of the school's social hierarchy, she unexpectedly befriends the popular and affluent Courtney Gripling, who is fascinated by Ginger's perspective and frequently includes her in her social circle. Courtney's best friend, Miranda Killgallen, views Ginger as a threat to her own social status and frequently attempts to undermine her.

At home, Ginger records her experiences in a diary, which serves as the series' narrative device. Meanwhile, her younger brother Carl and his best friend Hoodsey Bishop are featured in recurring comedic subplots, while Ginger's mother, Lois, provides guidance and support throughout the series.

=== Setting ===
The series is set in the fictional suburban town of Sheltered Shrubs, Connecticut. Sheltered Shrubs was inspired by Larchmont, New York, where series creator Emily Kapnek moved while attending junior high school. Kapnek stated that Larchmont became "sort of the basis for this show".

Other recurring locations include Protected Pines, the gated community where Courtney Gripling lives; Brittle Branches, the hometown of Ginger's father; and Heathered Hills, home to Sasha, whom Ginger meets at summer camp.

== Continuity and themes ==
As Told by Ginger has been recognized by fans and Nickelodeon alike for its character development, most of which was unusual for a cartoon in its time.

In the first season, Ginger's age group is considered as being in seventh grade. By the second season, they move up to eighth grade rather than remaining the same age. In this season, Darren has the unwieldy orthodontic headgear that he has worn for the entire first season removed, which results in rising popularity. They graduate junior high in the middle of the third season and move on to become freshmen in high school. Carl's age group works in the same way, as they become junior high students by the third season. Many episodes make references to past episodes, giving the episodes a definite order.

One notable aspect of the series was the rotating and evolving character wardrobes. Characters would change clothing every episode, and often within the same episode; a highly unusual characteristic at the time for both Nickelodeon animated shows and children's animation in general. The standard practice in animated television was to design a character with a specific "default" outfit that would rarely be changed, updated, or altered unless the plot necessitated it. Other Klasky Csupo productions of the time, such as Rugrats and Rocket Power, followed this practice. This served to simplify the animation process, saving money and production time.

By contrast, As Told by Ginger evoked live action sitcoms, where characters change clothes as frequently as they would in real life. This was most conspicuous amongst the girls in Ginger's age group (Dodie, Courtney, Macie, Miranda and Ginger herself) and some of the adults such as Ginger's mother. After Darren had his orthodontic headgear removed, his clothes changed as well.

Meanwhile, Carl's younger and less fashion-minded age group changed clothes infrequently, and with far fewer deviations from their usual style. Hoodsey stands out in particular as a satire of the traditional animated character who is only seen in one outfit, as he only ever wears a purple hooded sweatshirt and shorts, which other characters regard as abnormal. This is further satirized when it is revealed Hoodsey's clothes rack primarily consists of similar purple hoodies, indicating that to spite appearances, he change his clothes as frequently as the rest.

There were limits to this, however. Unlike many live-action shows whose characters often wore an outfit only once, As Told by Ginger characters frequently repeated one of their previously seen outfits in later episodes. New outfits were added every few episodes and certain outfits were no longer seen again after a point, resulting in a set wardrobe rotation for each individual character.

The series also deals with several deeper themes. In "Wicked Game", Ginger's two best friends betray her after feeling jealousy toward her new boyfriend, Darren. In "And She Was Gone", the staff and students at school think Ginger is suicidally depressed after she writes a disturbing poem that worries them. In the episode "No Hope for Courtney", Carl's pranks cause his teacher to retire. After she agrees to come back, Mrs. Gordon passes on. In actuality, Mrs. Gordon's voice actress, Kathleen Freeman, died before the episode's completion, and the script was rewritten in dedication to her. "A Lesson in Tightropes" has Ginger going through an emotional breakup with Darren (who has cheated on her with cheerleader Simone) while she must undergo surgery for appendicitis. Furthermore, the episode "Stuff'll Kill Ya" shows Ginger dealing with a coffee and caffeine drug addiction.

Series finale The Wedding Frame ends on a Flashforward scene, with Ginger (who is now an author) doing a reading of her book at a bookstore, with Lois, Dave, Carl, Hoodsie, Macie, Dodie, Chet Zipper, Dodie and Chet's daughter, and Darren in attendance. Darren is holding a mixed race baby with ginger hair, suggesting that he and Ginger ultimately made up and got back together. The film ends with a close up of Ginger's left hand (now with a wedding and engagement ring on it) on her now-closed book, which is titled As Told by Ginger. Ginger breaks the fourth wall at the end of her reading, and thanks both the audience in the bookshop watching her, and the viewers at home.

- In The Wedding Frame, when the Foutleys are driving to their soon-to-be home, they pass a cemetery park. One tombstone reads "ATBG" while another reads "RIP". ATBG is short for As Told by Ginger and RIP is short for "Rest in Peace". This is a nod to the fact that the film is the series finale.
- A girl named Leandra, who had a bone marrow illness and was a Make-A-Wish patient, was a fan of the series and watched it during her treatments. Her wish was to be a character on the show, so she appeared and voiced a character named after herself in a scene of the episode "Butterflies are Free", in which Ginger, Macie and Dodie greet her by name.

Unlike most other Nicktoons, the series occasionally aired on the TEENick block.

== Episodes ==
Season	Episodes		Originally released		
Season	Episodes		First released	Last released	Network
Pilot			October 9, 2015		TeenNick
1	20		October 25, 2000	December 10, 2001	Nickelodeon
2	20		February 11, 2002	June 29, 2003	Nickelodeon
3	20	12	August 9, 2003	July 4, 2004	Nickelodeon
3	20	2	November 24, 2004	November 14, 2006	Nicktoons

=== Television films ===
Four television films were produced during the series' run.

- Summer of Camp Caprice (also titled Season of Caprice) features Ginger, Dodie, Macie and Courtney heading to summer camp, with Darren and Miranda going to military camp (where Miranda's father works). Meanwhile, Carl and Hoodsey investigate dog nappings.
- Foutleys on Ice (released in the US as Far from Home), following up on the Emmy-nominated episode "And She Was Gone", deals with Ginger winning a scholarship to an arts school, and Carl and Hoodsey making friends with a new character, the telekinetic Noelle Sussman (voiced by series creator Emily Kapnek). This episode was released on VHS and DVD on April 5, 2005.
- Butterflies are Free follows Ginger and her friends graduating from junior high.
- The Wedding Frame closes out the third season and the series as a whole, and features Lois marrying one of the doctors at her hospital. It was only released on VHS and DVD in the United States on November 23, 2004. In 2021, it premiered on CBS All Access.

In international reruns, the films were divided into two (for Butterflies Are Free) and three parts (for the other three films).

== Production ==
The conception of As Told By Ginger began in the summer of 1996, shortly after the release of the dark comedy film Welcome to the Dollhouse. At the time, Nickelodeon and Klasky Csupo were hosting a screenwriting competition in New York, so Kapnek decided to develop an "animated version of junior high school hell," where the main character would tackle real issues that kids were dealing with, such as the pressure of fitting in and to look a certain way. The pilot for the show was completed in September 1999. The show premiered in October 2000 on Nickelodeon. The show was greatly popular at first, making its way into the teenager-aimed block TEENick. After the second season, the show's popularity began to decline, partially due to constant scheduling changes. Nickelodeon then pulled the show off the air after airing less than half the episodes of the third and final season. The show was a part of the Nicktoons channel since its inception in 2002, and began airing the remaining third-season episodes in November 2004, when "Ten Chairs" premiered. The "high school" episodes were slated to premiere during November 2006, but only one, "Stuff'll Kill Ya", premiered. Of the remaining Season 3 episodes, 4 ultimately premiered on TeenNick's The Splat in 2016, and the last 2 (including "The Wedding Frame", which had previously been released on DVD in the US in 2004) premiered on CBS All Access in 2021.

=== Show airings ===
Network	Time	In effect
Nickelodeon	Wednesdays at 8 pm	October 2000 – January 2001
Nickelodeon	Sundays at 7:30 pm	January 2001 – June 2003
Nick on CBS	Saturday mornings (Sunday mornings on some stations)	September 14, 2002 – January 25, 2003
Nickelodeon	Weekday mornings	November 2005
Nicktoons Network	Weekday mornings	November 2006 – May 2007
The N	Saturday nights	January 2007
Nicktoons Network	Sunday and Monday mornings	May 2007 – July 2007
Nickelodeon	Monday mornings	August 2007
Nicktoons Network	Tuesday and Saturday mornings	October 2007 – March 2008
Nickelodeon	6am Tuesdays	March 2008
Nicktoons Network	4:00am Tuesday and Saturday mornings	March 2008 – January 2009
The Splat	Fridays at 12am	October 9, 2015 – April 1, 2017
Four (New Zealand TV Channel)	Every morning 7.30am and later weekday and Sunday mornings 7.30am	February 7, 2011 – April 13, 2011
Indus Vision	Daily 5.30pm	August 2003 – November 2004
Spacetoon	Weekday mornings	March 2005 – January 2014
Spacetoon English	Tuesday mornings	April 2005 – January 2011
YTV	Daily	2001 – 2004
Nickelodeon Canada	Weekdays at 4 & 4:30pm	2014 – 2017

- The episodes "I Spy a Witch", "Déjà Who?", "An 'Even Steven' Holiday Special" and "Piece of My Heart" were all made for the first season lineup, but aired during the second season in the United States.
- "Never Can Say Goodbye", "Gym Class Confidential", "Fast Reputation" and "The Nurses' Strike" all premiered in the same week during the TEENick block. They aired February 11–14, 2002 (which were the days between Monday and Thursday).
- The episodes "Detention", "Kiss Today Goodbye", "A Lesson in Tightropes", "Dodie's Big Break" and "Battle of the Bands" are all high school episodes that were initially unaired in the United States. They were at one time scheduled to air during the second week of November 2006, but were immediately removed from the schedule after the first high school episode, "Stuff'll Kill Ya", was aired. "Detention", "Kiss Today Goodbye", "A Lesson in Tightropes" and "Dodie's Big Break" would premiere in the United States on TeenNick's The Splat in 2016, and "Battle of the Bands" would premiere on CBS All Access in 2021. In several other countries, especially in the United Kingdom, they are part of regular reruns.

=== Home video and streaming releases ===
- The TV films Far from Home and The Wedding Frame were released on VHS and DVD in the United States and Canada (Region 1). Also included are "Ginger the Juvey" and the pilot episode "The Party" on the former,and "Stealing First" and "Dare I, Darren" on the latter, only as bonus episodes on the DVD versions.
- The complete series was made available to purchase on iTunes in 2008, with all episodes divided into six volumes. As of January 2015, the series is no longer available on the service.
- The complete series was made available to stream on Paramount+ on January 12, 2021, only to be eventually removed from it on December 17, 2025.
- The first 45 episodes are available on Russian DVD sets with each disc containing 5 episodes. The DVDs (Cyrillic: Как говорит Джинджер) were distributed by Russobit-M and are only available with a Russian soundtrack.

Region 1
Title	Season(s)	Episode count	Release date	Episodes
The Wedding Frame	1, 3	5	November 23, 2004	3 ("Stealing First"), 6 ("Dare I, Darren") and 58–60 ("The Wedding Frame")
Far from Home	1, 3	5	April 5, 2005	1 "(Ginger the Juvey"), 41–43 ("Far from Home") and Pilot ("The Party")

=== Theme song ===
The opening theme, titled "I'm in Between", was written for the show by American rapper Ray Raymond. The song was first recorded with vocals by Melissa Disney, in character as Ginger, before being replaced with a version performed by Cree Summer. A third version featuring vocals by R&B artist Macy Gray began being used halfway through the first season, and was maintained for the rest of the series' run.

=== Closing credits ===
The closing credits are typically designed backgrounds with the show's signature font. These backgrounds include the ice cream cones from Ginger's bedroom walls, ladybugs from Dodie's bedroom walls, pencils, lizards and more. In several episodes, the ending theme is a rock-based instrumental, although there have been exceptions. "Piece of My Heart" ends with a different and softer instrumental melody. The episode "Never Can Say Goodbye" ended with a song called "Wrong", sung by voice actor Kenny Blank as Darren Patterson, and "And She Was Gone" ended with a musical version of Ginger's poem during the credits. The episode "Come Back, Little Seal Girl" featured the songs "Courtney's World" and "The Little Seal Girl" blended together. In "About Face", a song called "Diamonds Are Expensive", presumably sung by the engaged Lois and Dr. Dave, is played over the credits. "Next Question" ended with "The Teen Seal Girl" song. Finally, the episode "No Hope for Courtney" had no music during the credits, being dedicated to the memory of Kathleen Freeman.

== Awards ==
- Three Emmy nominations for "Hello Stranger" (in 2001), "Lunatic Lake" (in 2002), and "And She Was Gone" (in 2003). All three were nominated in the Outstanding Animated Program (Less than One Hour) category.
- "Best Cartoon" at Nickelodeon Netherlands Kids Choice Awards in 2005.
- Two episodes of As Told by Ginger were ranked in Nickelodeon's "100 Greatest Moments in Nicktoons History", a special presented by Nickelodeon in November 2007. The episodes "Gym Class Confidential" and "Stealing First" were ranked at 97 and 95.
