= Peter Sellers on stage, radio, screen and record =

English actor and comedian Peter Sellers (1925–1980) performed in many genres of light entertainment, including film, radio and theatre. He appeared in the BBC Radio comedy series The Goon Show, recorded a number of hit comic songs and became known internationally through his many film characterisations, among them Chief Inspector Clouseau in The Pink Panther film series. English filmmakers the Boulting brothers described Sellers as "the greatest comic genius this country has produced since Charles Chaplin".

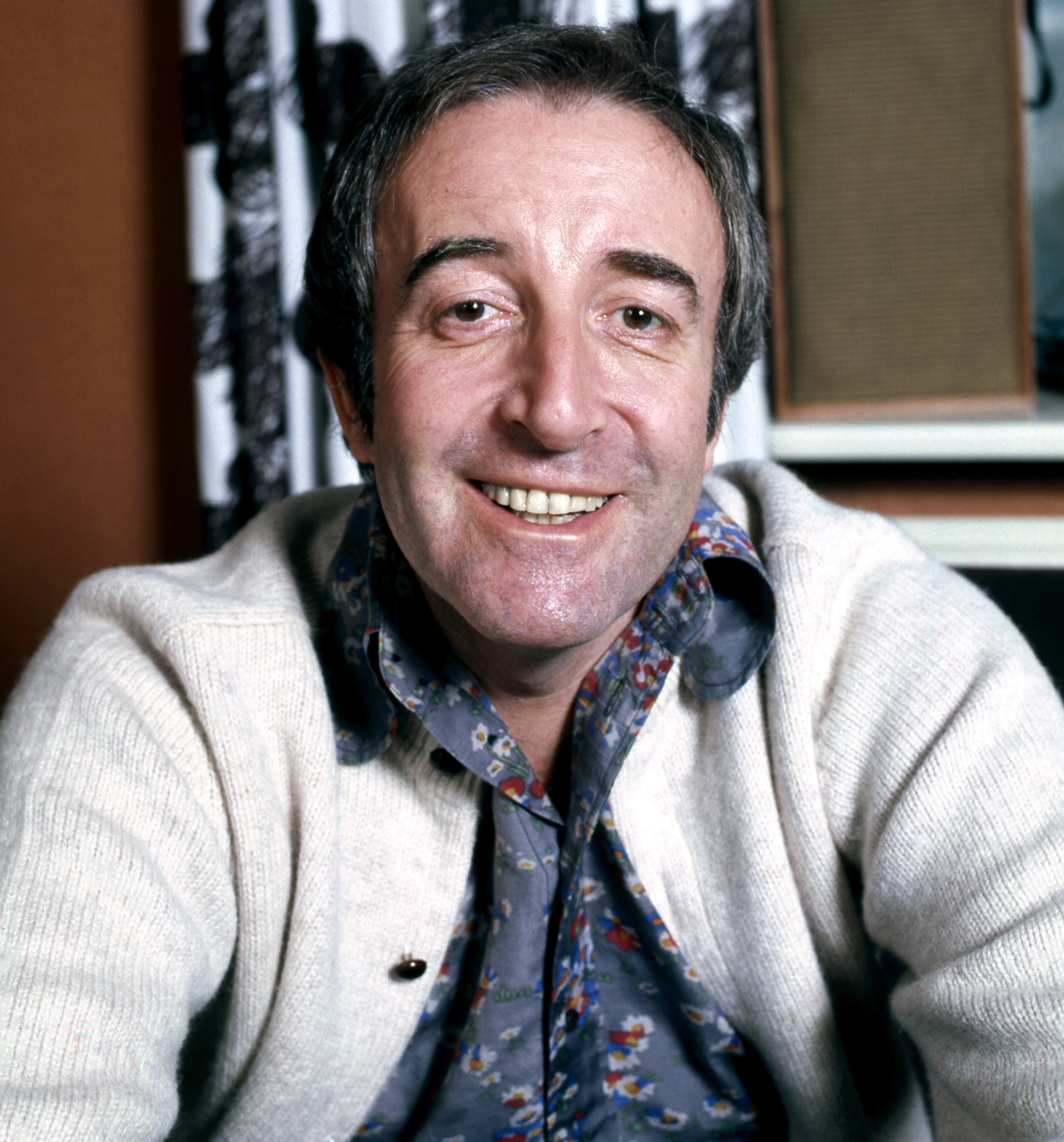
Peter Sellers (pictured in 1973) was one of the best known comedians of his generation.

Sellers's career on radio, film, television and record spanned from 1948 until his death. He made his radio debut on ShowTime in 1948, followed by appearances in Ray's a Laugh, Starlight Hour, The Gang Show, Henry Hall's Guest Night and It's Fine to Be Young. Along with Spike Milligan, Harry Secombe and Michael Bentine, he took part in the radio series The Goon Show (1951–60). One newspaper described it as "probably the most influential comedy show of all time". For Sellers, the BBC considers it had the effect of launching his career "on the road to stardom".

Throughout his career, Sellers made a number of television appearances, in character roles and for interviews and advertisements. His stage appearances were few, largely because he had been unhappy with the touring he had done as a child with his family. During his career, he also released a number of albums containing sketches and comic songs; the songs were undertaken in a variety of comic characters. Sellers's versatility enabled him to portray a wide range of comic characters using different accents and guises, and he would often assume multiple roles within the same film, frequently with contrasting temperaments and styles. A feature of the characterisations undertaken by Sellers is that, regardless of how clumsy or idiotic they are, he ensured that they always retained their dignity.

Starting in the 1950s, Sellers appeared in over fifty films, including I'm All Right Jack, Dr. Strangelove, Lolita, Being There and the Pink Panther series. At the peak of his career, he was one of the most popular stars at the British box office: third in most popular films in 1962, and second in 1963. Sellers was nominated three times for an Academy Award, twice for the Academy Award for Best Actor. Turner Classic Movies calls Sellers "one of the most accomplished comic actors of the late 20th century". In 2005, Channel 4 conducted a survey of modern-day comedians, who ranked Sellers as the 14th most influential comedian of all time.

== Stage credits ==
Stage credits of Peter Sellers
Show	Dates	Theatre	Role	Notes
Jack and the Beanstalk	1946	Théâtre Marigny	Various	
Mother Goose	December 1954 – March 1955	London Palladium	The Squire	
Brouhaha	17 August 1958 – February 1959	Aldwych Theatre	The Sultan	

At the start of his career, Sellers also performed acts in a number of variety shows in various parts of Britain; his wartime service with the Gang Shows of Ralph Reader saw him perform in India, Ceylon and Burma.

== Selected radio broadcasts ==
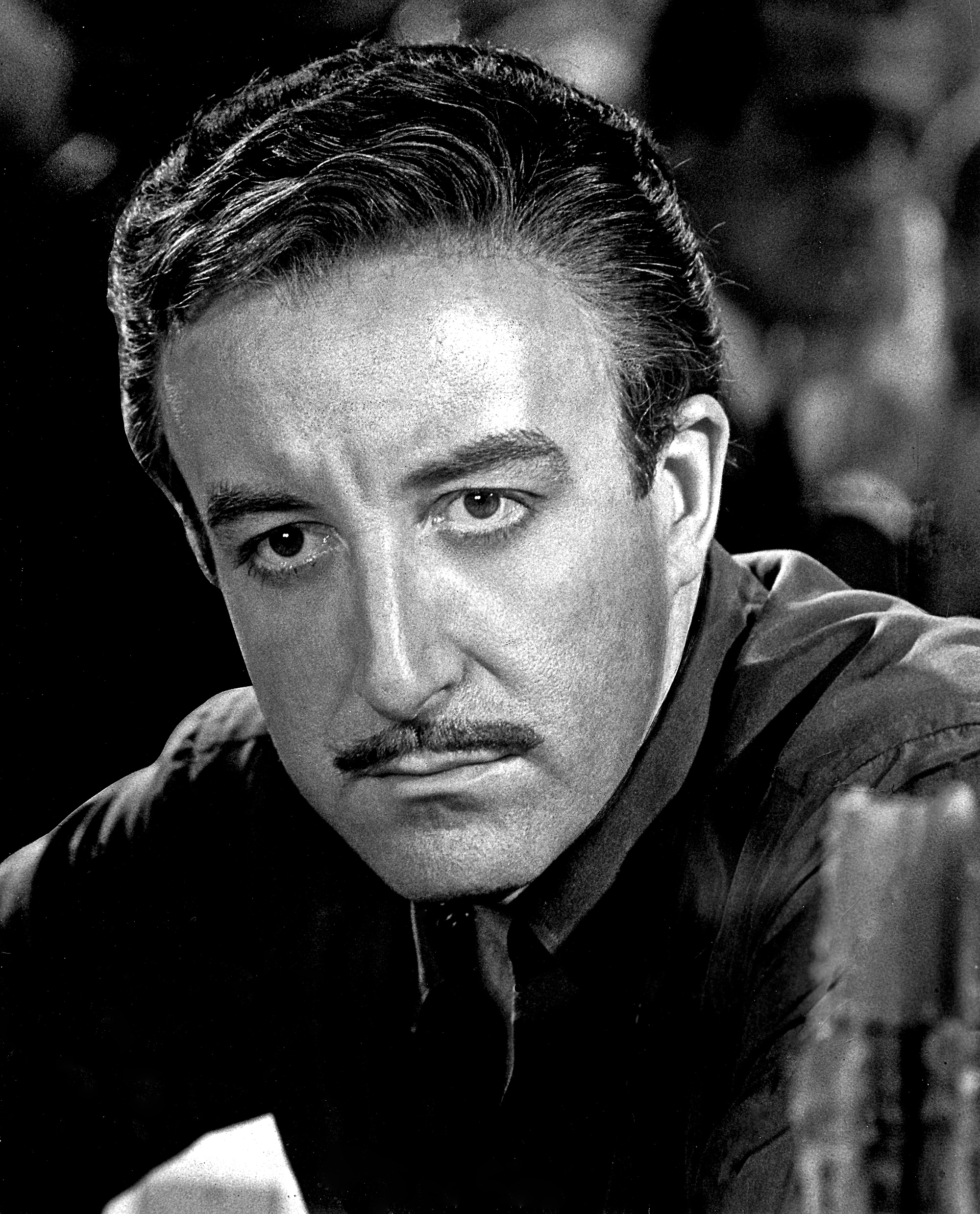
Sellers in the 1966 film After the Fox

Selected radio broadcasts of Peter Sellers
Programme	Year(s)	Number of episodes	Notes
ShowTime	1948	2	Appeared in the 1 July and 19 August 1948 broadcasts
It's Fine to Be Young	1948	4	Appeared in the weekly 31 August–21 September 1948 broadcasts
Third Division	1949	6	First broadcast in late January 1949
Petticoat Lane	1949	7	Unknown broadcast dates
Sellers Market	1950	8	Broadcast in March 1950
Crazy People	1951	17	Broadcast under the show's original name, Crazy People, against the wishes of the Goons; broadcast 28 May – 20 September 1951
"Cinderella"	1951	1	The Goon Show pantomime; broadcast 26 December 1951
The Goon Show, Season 2	1952	25	Broadcast 22 January–15 July 1952
The Goon Show, Season 3	1952–1953	25	Broadcast 11 November 1952 –5 May 1953
"Coronation Edition"	1953	1	The Goon Show special; broadcast 1 June 1953
The Goon Show, Season 4	1953–1954	30	Broadcast 2 October 1953 –19 April 1954
"Archie in Goonland"	1954	1	The Goon Show crossover with Educating Archie; broadcast 11 June 1954
"The Starlings"	1954	1	The Goon Show special; broadcast 31 August 1954
The Goon Show, Season 5	1954–1955	26	Broadcast 28 September 1954 –22 March 1955
The Goon Show, Season 6	1955–1956	27	Broadcast 20 September 1955 –15 November 1955
"China Story"	1956	1	The Goon Show special; broadcast 29 August 1956
The Goon Show, Season 7	1956	25	Broadcast 4 October 1956 –1 November 1956
Sellers Market	1957	8	Broadcast in March 1950
Desert Island Discs	1957	1	Broadcast on 4 February 1957
The Goon Show, Season 8	1957–1958	26	Broadcast 30 September 1957 –24 March 1958
Vintage Goons	1957–1958	14	Selected remakes of past episodes of The Goon Show; broadcast 6 October 1957 –23 March 1958
The Goon Show, Season 9	1958–1959	17	Broadcast 2 November 1958 –23 February 1959
The Goon Show, Season 10	1959–1960	6	Broadcast 24 December 1959 –28 January 1960
"The Last Goon Show of All"	1972	1	Broadcast 5 October 1972

Sellers also appeared in supporting roles in a number of other radio programmes from the 1940s to the 1970s.

== Filmography ==
Filmography of Peter Sellers
Film	Year	Role	Notes
The Black Rose	1950	Lu Chung (voice only)	Sellers dubbed the part played by Alfonso Bedoya (uncredited)
Penny Points to Paradise	1951	The Major, Arnold Fringe	
Let's Go Crazy	1951	Groucho, Giuseppe, Cedric, Izzy, Gozzunk, Crystal Jollibottom	Short film. Also co-wrote screenplay (uncredited)
Burlesque on Carmen	1951	Narrator	1951 re-release of Charlie Chaplin's 1915 short
Down Among the Z Men	1952	Major Bloodnok	
Our Girl Friday	1953	Parrot	Voice (uncredited)
The Super Secret Service	1953	Sir Walter Smood / Reuben J. Crouch	
Orders Are Orders	1954	Private Griffin	
John and Julie	1955	Police Constable Diamond	
The Ladykillers	1955	Harry Robinson	
The Case of the Mukkinese Battle Horn	1956	Narrator, Supt. Quilt, Asst. Commissioner Sir Jervis Fruit, Henry Crun	Short film. Also additional material
The Man Who Never Was	1956	Winston Churchill	Voice only
Insomnia Is Good for You	1957	Hector Dimwiddle	Short film, Sellers co-wrote film with Mordecai Richler
Dearth of a Salesman	1957	Hector Dimwiddle	Short film, Sellers co-wrote film with Mordecai Richler
Cold Comfort	1957	Hector Dimwiddle	Short film, Sellers co-wrote film with Mordecai Richler
The Smallest Show on Earth	1957	Percy Quill	
The Naked Truth	1957	Sonny McGregor	
Up the Creek	1958	CPO Doherty	
Tom Thumb	1958	Antony	
Carlton-Browne of the F.O.	1959	Prime Minister Amphibulos	
The Mouse That Roared	1959	Grand Duchess Gloriana XII, Prime Minister Count Rupert Mountjoy, Tully Bascombe	
I'm All Right Jack	1959	Fred Kite	Won: BAFTA Award for Best British Actor
The Battle of the Sexes	1959	Mr. Martin	
The Running Jumping & Standing Still Film	1960	Photographer	Short film. Also co-writer and producer Won: San Francisco International Film Festival Award for Best Fiction Short; Nominated: Academy Award for Best Live Action Short Film
Never Let Go	1960	Lionel Meadows	
The Millionairess	1960	Dr. Ahmed el Kabir	
Two-Way Stretch	1960	Dodger Lane	
Mr. Topaze	1961	Auguste Topaze	Also director
Only Two Can Play	1962	John Lewis	Nominated: BAFTA Award for Best British Actor
Waltz of the Toreadors	1962	General Leo Fitzjohn	Won: San Sebastián International Film Festival Award for Best Actor
The Road to Hong Kong	1962	Indian Neurologist	Uncredited
Lolita	1962	Clare Quilty	Nominated: Golden Globe Award for Best Supporting Actor – Motion Picture
The Dock Brief (a.k.a. Trial & Error)	1962	Wilfred Morgenhall	
The Wrong Arm of the Law	1963	Pearly Gates	
Heavens Above!	1963	The Reverend John Smallwood	
The Pink Panther	1963	Inspector Jacques Clouseau	Nominated: BAFTA Award for Best British Actor; Golden Globe Award for Best Actor – Motion Picture Musical or Comedy
Dr. Strangelove or: How I Learned to Stop Worrying and Love the Bomb	1964	Group Captain Lionel Mandrake, President Merkin Muffley, Dr. Strangelove	Nominated: Academy Award for Best Actor; BAFTA Award for Best British Actor
The World of Henry Orient	1964	Henry Orient	
A Shot in the Dark	1964	Inspector Jacques Clouseau	
Carol for Another Christmas	1964	King of the Individualists	TV film (Note: The character may have been called Imperial Me, according to The New York Times.)
Birds, Bees and Storks	1965	Narrator	Short film
What's New Pussycat?	1965	Doctor Fritz Fassbender	
The Wrong Box	1966	Doctor Pratt	
After the Fox	1966	Aldo Vanucci	
Casino Royale	1967	Evelyn Tremble / James Bond	Also additional screenplay (uncredited)
Woman Times Seven	1967	Jean	
The Bobo	1967	Juan Bautista	
The Party	1968	Hrundi V. Bakshi	
I Love You, Alice B. Toklas	1968	Harold Fine	
The Magic Christian	1969	Sir Guy Grand KG, KC, CBE	Also additional material
A Day at the Beach	1970	Salesman	Credited under the alias "A. Queen"
Hoffman	1970	Benjamin Hoffman	
Simon, Simon	1970	Man with two cars (cameo)	Short film
There's a Girl in My Soup	1970	Robert Danvers	
Where Does It Hurt?	1972	Dr. Albert T. Hopfnagel	
Alice's Adventures in Wonderland	1972	March Hare	
Ghost in the Noonday Sun	1973	Dick Scratcher	Released posthumously in 1985 on VHS and Betamax
The Blockhouse	1973	Rouquet	Shown at the Berlin Film Festival, but otherwise unreleased until 1978.
The Optimists of Nine Elms	1973	Sam	Won: Tehran Film Festival Award for Best Actor
Soft Beds, Hard Battles	1974	Général Latour, Major Robinson, Herr Schroeder, Adolf Hitler, The President, Prince Kyoto	
The Great McGonagall	1974	Queen Victoria	
The Return of the Pink Panther	1975	Inspector Jacques Clouseau	Won: The Evening News British Film Award for Best Actor; Nominated: Golden Globe Award for Best Actor – Motion Picture Musical or Comedy
Murder by Death	1976	Sidney Wang	
The Pink Panther Strikes Again	1976	Inspector Jacques Clouseau	Nominated: Golden Globe Award for Best Actor – Motion Picture Musical or Comedy
Kingdom of Gifts	1978	Larcenous Mayor	Voice only
Revenge of the Pink Panther	1978	Inspector Jacques Clouseau	
The Prisoner of Zenda	1979	Rudolf IV, Rudolf V, Syd Frewin	
Being There	1979	Chance	Won: Golden Globe Award for Best Actor – Motion Picture Musical or Comedy; London Film Critics Circle Special Award; National Board of Review Award for Best Actor; New York Film Critics Circle Award for Best Actor; Nominated: Academy Award for Best Actor; BAFTA Award for Best British Actor
The Fiendish Plot of Dr. Fu Manchu	1980	Sir Denis Nayland Smith, Dr. Fu "Fred" Manchu	Also director (uncredited; posthumous release)
Trail of the Pink Panther	1982	Inspector Jacques Clouseau	Sellers' new material consists entirely of previously cut footage from The Pink Panther Strikes Again, with clips from the previous films shown as flashbacks.

=== Awards and nominations ===
Sellers played three parts in Dr. Strangelove, including the titular character (pictured)

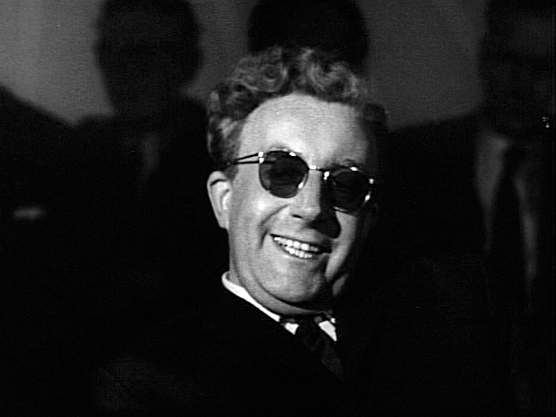
Dr. Strangelove

Awards and nominations for Peter Sellers's film work
Film	Year	Award	Category	Result	Notes
The Running Jumping & Standing Still Film	1959	32nd Academy Awards	Short Subject (Live Action)	Nominated	Sellers was the producer and cast member
I'm All Right Jack	1959	13th British Academy Film Awards	Best British Actor	Won	
Waltz of the Toreadors	1962	San Sebastián International Film Festival	Best Actor	Won	
Lolita	1962	20th Golden Globe Awards	Best Supporting Actor	Nominated	
Only Two Can Play	1962	16th British Academy Film Awards	Best British Actor	Nominated	
Dr. Strangelove or: How I Learned to Stop Worrying and Love the Bomb	1964	37th Academy Awards	Best British Actor	Nominated	
The Pink Panther	1964	22nd Golden Globe Awards	Best Actor – Musical or Comedy	Nominated	
Dr. Strangelove or: How I Learned to Stop Worrying and Love the Bomb	1964	18th British Academy Film Awards	Best British Actor	Nominated	
The Pink Panther	1965	18th British Academy Film Awards	Best British Actor	Nominated	
The Optimists of Nine Elms	1973	Tehran Film Festival	Best Actor	Won	
The Return of the Pink Panther	1976	33rd Golden Globe Awards	Best Actor – Musical or Comedy	Nominated	
The Return of the Pink Panther	1976	The Evening News British Film Awards	Best Actor	Won	
The Pink Panther Strikes Again	1977	34th Golden Globe Awards	Best Actor – Musical or Comedy	Nominated	
Being There	1979	51st National Board of Review Awards	Best Actor	Won	
Being There	1979	45th New York Film Critics Circle Awards	Best Actor	Won	
Being There	1980	37th Golden Globe Awards	Best Actor – Musical or Comedy	Won	
Being There	1980	52nd Academy Awards	Best Actor	Nominated	
Being There	1980	34th British Academy Film Awards	Best Actor in a Leading Role	Nominated	
Being There	1980	London Film Critics' Circle Award	Best Actor	Won	

== Television ==
Main series and appearances

Television: main series and notable appearances of Peter Sellers
Programme	Year	Number of episodes	Notes
And So to Bentley	1954	13	
The Idiot Weekly, Price 2d	1956	6	As "The Editor"; broadcast 24 February–23 April 1956
A Show Called Fred	1956	5	Broadcast 2–30 May 1956
Son of Fred	1956	8	Broadcast 17 September–5 November 1956
Yes, It's the Cathode-Ray Tube Show!	1957	6	Broadcast 11 February–18 March 1957
The Telegoons, Series 1	1963	11	Broadcast 10 October–28 December 1963
The Telegoons, Series 2	1964	15	Broadcast 20 March–1 August 1964

Selected guest appearances

Television: guest appearances of Peter Sellers
Programme	Year	Number of episodes	Notes
The Steve Allen Show	1964	1	Broadcast on 20 March 1964
Not Only... But Also	1965	2	Broadcast in 1965
This Is Tom Jones	1969	1	Broadcast on 7 February 1969
Rowan & Martin's Laugh-In	1969–1970	3	Broadcast on 15 September 1969, 17 November 1969, and 16 March 1970
The New Bill Cosby Show	1972	1	Broadcast on 18 September 1972
Sykes	1972	1	Broadcast in October 1972
Parkinson	1974	1	Broadcast in the autumn of 1974
The Muppet Show	1978	1	Broadcast in February 1978
The Beatles: Get Back	2021	1	Streamed on Disney Plus

== Advertisements ==
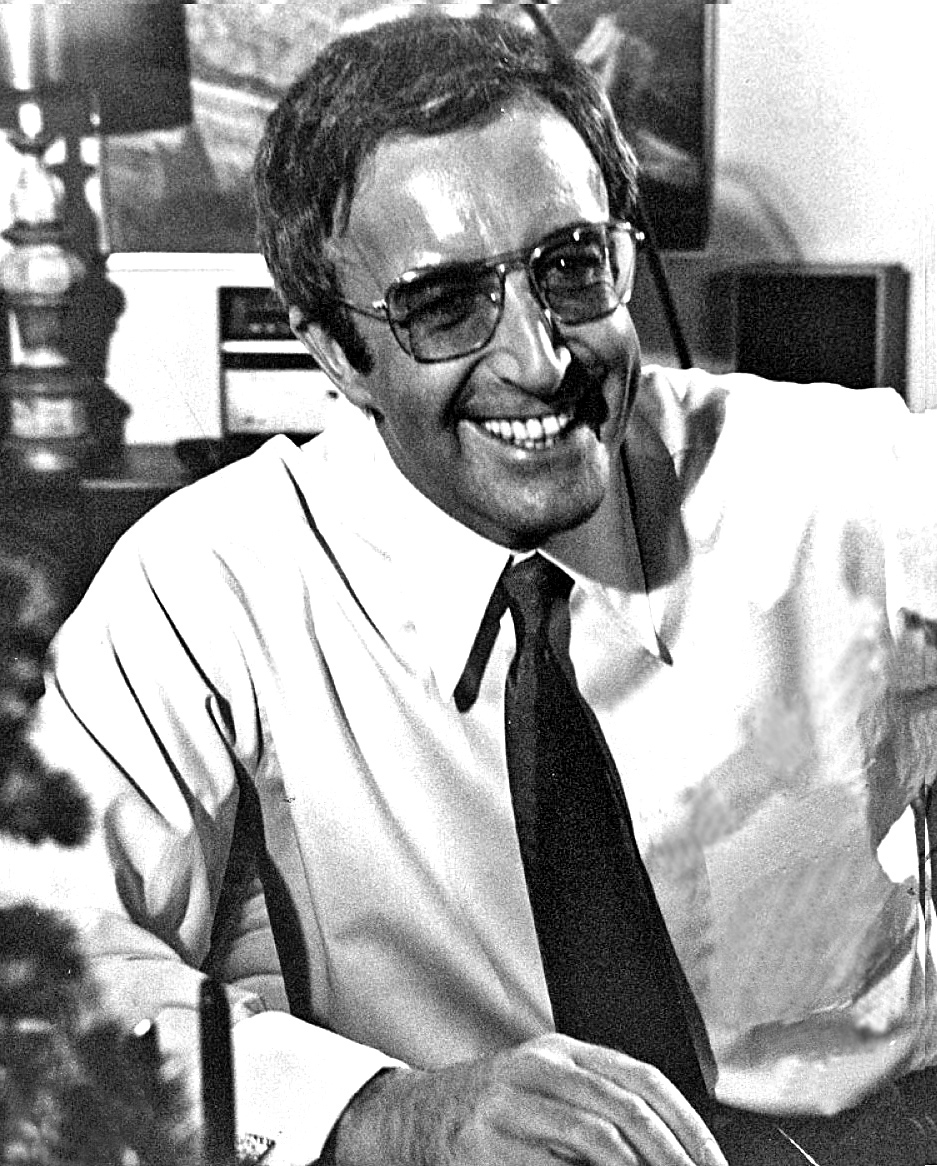
Sellers often characterised his appearances when he was hired for advertisements.

Advertisements in which Peter Sellers appeared
Product	Year(s)	Notes
PG Tips	mid-1950s	Sellers and Kenneth Connor voiced chimpanzees for the first six adverts.
Benson & Hedges	1973	Only shown in UK cinemas
Trans World Airlines	1975	Sellers played several characters, including Thrifty McTravel, Jeremy 'Piggy' Peak Thyme and an Italian singer, Vito.
Barclaycard	1980	Three adverts as Monte Casino, a Jewish con-man

== Discography ==
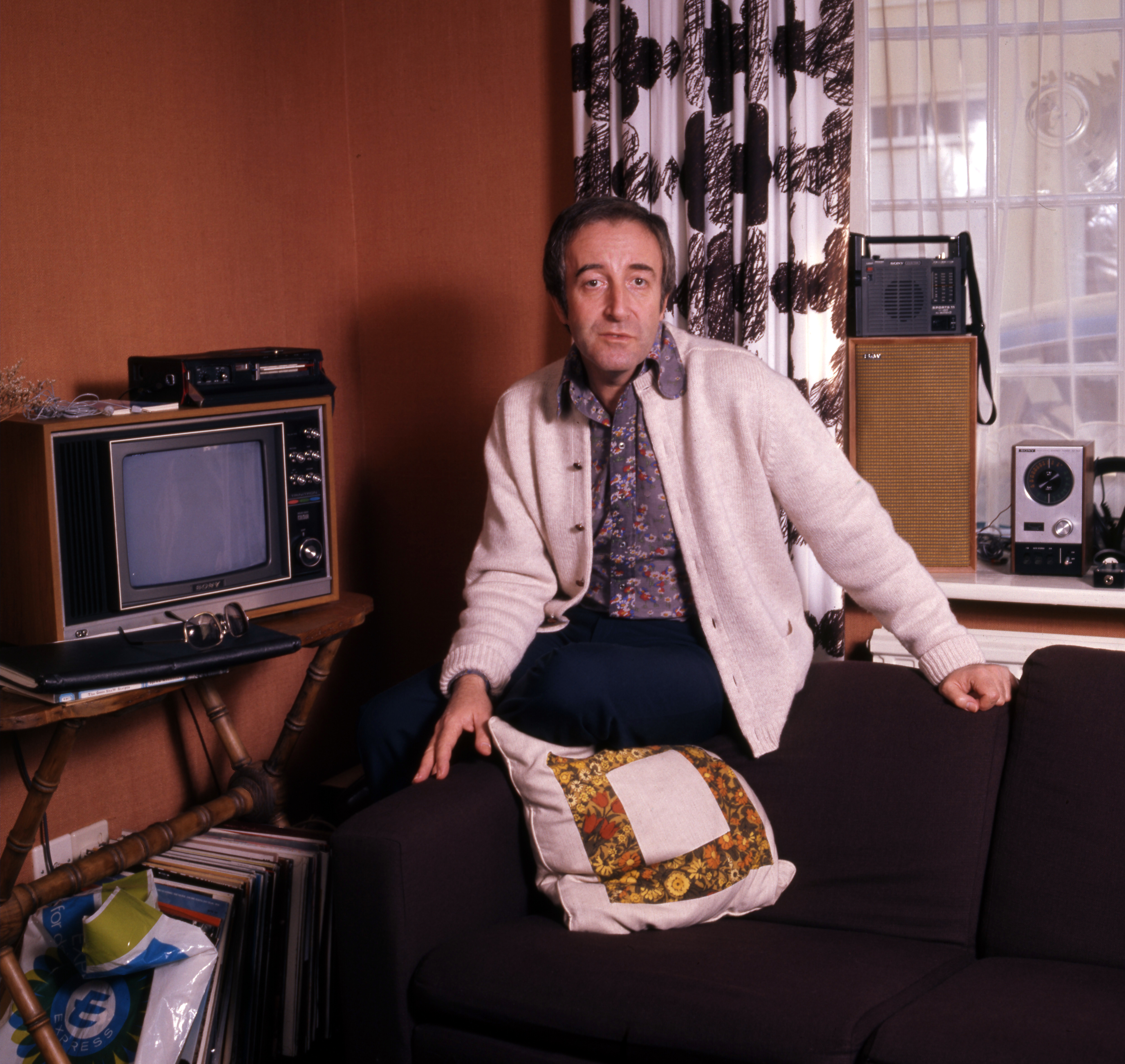
As well as film appearances, Sellers achieved chart success with his comedy album and single releases.

=== Albums ===
==== Studio albums ====
Title	Album details	Peak chart positions
Title	Album details	UK
The Best of Sellers	Released: December 1958; Label: Parlophone; Formats: LP	3
Songs for Swingin' Sellers	Released: 4 December 1959; Label: Parlophone; Formats: LP	3
Peter and Sophia (with Sophia Loren)	Released: November 1960; Label: Parlophone; Formats: LP	5
How to Win an Election (Or Not Lose by Much) (with Harry Secombe and Spike Milligan) (Note: Unlike the album The Last Goon Show of All, this release was not credited to The Goons, but listed under the names of the three performers.)	Released: April 1964; Label: Philips; Formats: LP	20
He's Innocent of Watergate.... Or Dick's Last Stand (with Spike Milligan)	Released: 1974; Label: Decca; Formats: LP	—
Sellers Market	Released: October 1979; Label: United Artists; Formats: LP, MC	—
"—" denotes releases that did not chart.

==== Other albums ====
Title	Album details	Peak chart positions
Title	Album details	UK
Fool Britannia (with Joan Collins and Anthony Newley)	Released: September 1963; Label: Ember; Formats: LP; Cast recording of the musical of the same name	10
The Parkinson Interview	Released: 1980; Label: BBC; Formats: LP, MC; Edited highlights of 1974 interview with Michael Parkinson	—
"—" denotes releases that did not chart.

==== Compilation albums ====
Title	Album details
The Songs of Sellers	Released: November 1983; Label: Music for Pleasure; Formats: LP
The Peter Sellers Collection	Released: July 1990; Label: EMI; Formats: CD, 2xMC
Legends of the 20th Century	Released: June 1999; Label: EMI; Formats: CD
Classic Songs and Sketches	Released: 18 September 2000; Label: EMI Gold; Formats: CD
Greatest Comedy Cuts	Released: 19 July 2004; Label: EMI Gold; Formats: 2xCD
Peter Sellers & Friends	Released: December 2008; Label: Secret Society; Formats: CD
Remembering Peter Sellers	Released: August 2010; Label: BBC; Formats: 2xCD
Songs for Swingin' Sellers... And a Little Bit More	Released: April 2010; Label: Delta; Formats: CD
Vintage Peter Sellers	Released: 2012; Label: Duke Marketing; Formats: CD
Goodness Gracious Me!	Released: 2012; Label: One Day Music; Formats: CD

==== Box sets ====
Title	Album details
The Voice Behind the Mask	Released: 1981; Label: Guild; Formats: 4xLP
A Celebration of Sellers	Released: November 1993; Label: EMI; Formats: 4xCD

=== EPs ===
Title	Album details	Peak chart positions
Title	Album details	UK
The Best of Sellers	Released: November 1959; Label: Parlophone; Formats: 7"	15
The Best of Sellers No.2	Released: January 1960; Label: Parlophone; Formats: 7"	8
The Best of Sellers No.3	Released: September 1960; Label: Parlophone; Formats: 7"	—
Songs for Swingin' Sellers No. 1	Released: January 1961; Label: Parlophone; Formats: 7"	—
Songs for Swingin' Sellers No. 2	Released: March 1961; Label: Parlophone; Formats: 7"	—
Songs for Swingin' Sellers No. 3	Released: April 1961; Label: Parlophone; Formats: 7"	—
Songs for Swingin' Sellers No. 4	Released: May 1961; Label: Parlophone; Formats: 7"	—
Peter and Sophia No. 1	Released: September 1961; Label: Parlophone; Formats: 7"	—
Peter and Sophia No. 2	Released: October 1961; Label: Parlophone; Formats: 7"	—
Peter and Sophia No. 3	Released: December 1961; Label: Parlophone; Formats: 7"	—
The Two Peters	Released: August 1962; Label: Parlophone; Formats: 7"; Split EP with Peter Ustinov	—
Fool Britannia – Volume One	Released: September 1963; Label: Parlophone; Formats: 7"	—
More Fool Britannia	Released: September 1963; Label: Parlophone; Formats: 7"	—
A Hard Day's Night	A comedy version of the Lennon/McCartney song in which he recited the lyrics in the style of Laurence Olivier in the film Richard III; Released: November 1993; Label: Parlophone; Formats: CD	52
"—" denotes releases that did not chart.

=== Singles ===
Title	Year	Peak chart positions				Album
Title	Year	UK	AUS	IRE	NZ	Album
"Dipso-Calypso"	1954	—	—	—	—	Non-album singles
"Any Old Iron"	1957	17	—	—	—	Non-album singles
"I'm So Ashamed"	1958	—	79	—	—	The Best of Sellers
"My Old Dutch"	1959	—	—	—	—	Songs for Swingin' Sellers
"Goodness Gracious Me!" (with Sophia Loren)	1960	4	15	5	3	Peter and Sophia
"Bangers and Mash" (with Sophia Loren)	1960	22	—	—	—	Peter and Sophia
"A Hard Day's Night"	1965	14	—	—	—	Non-album single
"After the Fox" (with the Hollies)	1966	—	—	—	—	After the Fox soundtrack
"The House on Rue Sichel"	1974	—	—	—	—	Non-album single
"Thank Heaven for Little Girls" (as Chef Inspecteur Jacques Clouseau with the Academie de la Surete)	1978	—	—	—	—	Revenge of the Pink Panther soundtrack
"They're Parking Camels Where Taxis Used to Be"	1980	—	—	—	—	Sellers Market
"The Unreleased She Loves You"	1981	—	—	—	—	Non-album singles
"Unchained Melody" (with Spike Milligan)	1990	—	—	—	—	Non-album singles
"—" denotes releases that did not chart or were not released in that territory.

=== Contributions ===
Year	Album	Artist	Contribution
1975	Commoners Crown	Steeleye Span	Played ukulele on one track
1977	Captain Beaky & His Band	Captain Beaky and His Band	Performed on two tracks

== See also ==
- List of British actors
- List of Academy Award winners and nominees from Great Britain
- List of actors with Academy Award nominations

== Bibliography ==
- Hall, Julian (2006). The Rough Guide to British Cult Comedy. London: Rough Guides. ISBN 978-1-84353-618-5.
- Halliwell, Leslie (2001). Halliwell's who's who in the movies. London: HarperCollins. ISBN 978-0-00-257214-9.
- Lewis, Roger (1995). The Life and Death of Peter Sellers. London: Arrow Books. ISBN 978-0-09-974700-0.
- Rigelsford, Adrian (2004). Peter Sellers: A Life in Character. London: Virgin Books. ISBN 978-0-7535-0270-9.
- Sikov, Ed (2002). Mr Strangelove; A Biography of Peter Sellers. London: Sidgwick & Jackson. ISBN 978-0-283-07297-0.
- Spizer, Bruce; Livingston, Alan W. (2000). The Beatles' Story on Capitol Records: Beatlemania & the Singles. London: Four Ninety-Eight Productions. ISBN 978-0-9662649-1-3.
- Who Was Who (1971–1980). London: A & C Black. 1981. ISBN 978-0-7136-2176-1.
