= The Pink Panther Theme =

1963 jazz piece by Henry Mancini and Waltel Branco

Single by Henry Mancini

from the album The Pink Panther
- Released: 1963
- Recorded: 1963
- Genre: Jazz, big band
- Length: 2:40
- Label: RCA Victor
- Composer: Henry Mancini
- Producer: Joe Reisman

Henry Mancini singles chronology
"Charade" (1963)	"The Pink Panther Theme" (1963)	"A Shot in the Dark" (1964)

Audio
- "The Pink Panther Theme" (audio) on YouTube

Audio sample
- file; help

"The Pink Panther Theme" is a jazz composition by Henry Mancini written as the theme for the 1963 film The Pink Panther and subsequently nominated for the Academy Award for Best Original Score at the 37th Academy Awards but lost to the Sherman Brothers for Mary Poppins. The eponymous cartoon character created for the film's opening credits by David DePatie and Friz Freleng was animated in time to the tune. The tenor saxophone solo was played by Plas Johnson.

== Overview ==
The tune was included on the film's soundtrack album (originally issued as RCA Victor LPM/LSP-2795) and available as a single (in the United States) in 1964; the single reached the Top 10 on the U.S. Billboard adult contemporary chart and won three Grammy Awards.

Various recordings of the composition appeared in the opening credits of all The Pink Panther films except A Shot in the Dark and Inspector Clouseau. It has also been used in theatrical shorts, television cartoons, commercials and other works in which the animated Pink Panther appears.

"The Pink Panther Theme" is composed in the key of E minor, temporarily moves to the key of G minor for a bridge, and finishes back in the original key.

In his autobiography Did They Mention the Music?, Mancini talked about how he composed the theme music:

I told [the animators] that I would give them a tempo they could animate to, so that any time there were striking motions, someone getting hit, I could score to it.

[The animators] finished the sequence and I looked at it. All the accents in the music were timed to actions on the screen.

I had a specific saxophone player in mind—Plas Johnson. I nearly always precast my players and write for them and around them, and Plas had the sound and the style I wanted.

== Personnel ==
- Plas Johnson – tenor saxophone
- Gene Cipriano, Harry Klee, Ronny Lang, Ted Nash – flute, saxophones
- Frank Beach, Conrad Gozzo, Jack Sheldon, Ray Triscari – trumpets
- Karl DeKarske, Dick Nash, Jimmy Priddy – trombones
- John Halliburton – bass trombone
- Al Hendrickson – guitar
- Larry Bunker, Frank Flynn – vibraphone and percussion
- Jimmy Rowles – piano
- Rolly Bundock – bass
- Shelly Manne – drums
- Pete Jolly – accordion
- Ramon Rivera – congas, percussion

== Other versions ==
The theme and variations thereof were used in the Pink Panther theatrical shorts, composed by William Lava and Walter Greene, as well as for the television series The Pink Panther Show, The New Pink Panther Show, and The All New Pink Panther Show, the former two composed by Doug Goodwin and the latter composed by Steve DePatie, David's son.

From 1976 to 1991, the theme served as the think music for Safe Crackers, a pricing game featured on the American game show The Price Is Right.

In the 1978 film Revenge of the Pink Panther, the theme—and much of the soundtrack from this entry in the series—drew heavily from the disco sound of the late 1970s. The theme itself was reworked to include a dancier bassline, electric keyboard, and a guitar solo. A similar treatment was given to 1983's Curse of the Pink Panther, where the music featured considerably more synthesized elements.

The theme was used in John McLaughlin and Al Di Meola's live version of Chick Corea's "Short Tales of the Black Forest", from the 1981 album Friday Night in San Francisco.

In the 1993 film Son of the Pink Panther, the theme was rearranged and performed by Bobby McFerrin in the opening titles, the only version of the theme to be performed in a cappella style. The credits featured the theme in the traditional style, similar to its appearance in The Return of the Pink Panther, with an electric keyboard bassline.

A 1990s pop-style arrangement of the theme by Jared Faber is featured in the soundtrack of the 1996 computer game The Pink Panther: Passport to Peril as the game's opening theme.

Actresses Drew Barrymore, Lucy Liu and Cameron Diaz, along with Los Angeles–based entertainers The Pussycat Dolls, danced to the theme in their film Charlie's Angels: Full Throttle (2003).

Christophe Beck rearranged the music for various uses in the 2006 reboot and its sequel, The Pink Panther 2—DJ Paul Oakenfold remixed the theme song for the 2006 film. Mancini is given a posthumous credit in the opening titles for the theme.

The theme was featured in the film The Life and Death of Peter Sellers (2004).

A rearranged rock-styled electric-guitar version of Henry Mancini's "Pink Panther Theme", composed by David Ricard, was used for the short-lived Pink Panther and Pals series in 2010.

== Certifications ==
Region	Certification	Certified units/sales
United States (RIAA) Mastertone	Gold	500,000^{*}
^{*} Sales figures based on certification alone.
