= Graham Stark =

English comedian and actor (1922–2013)

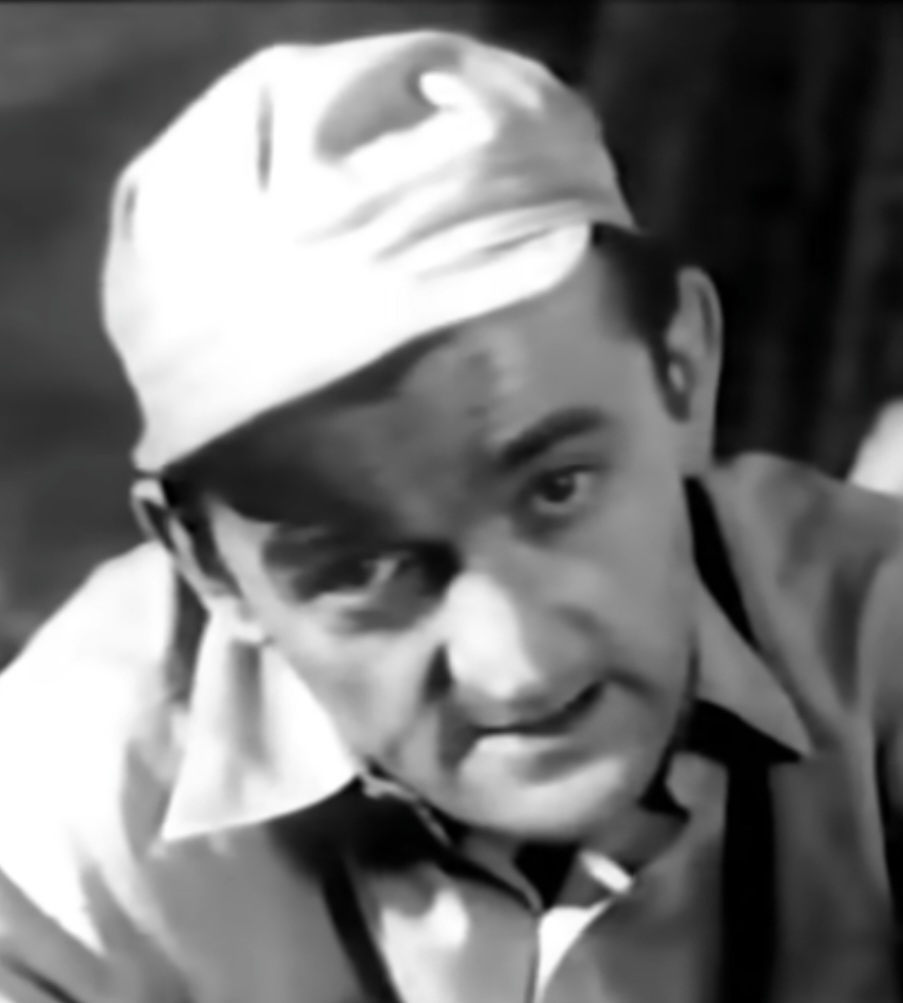
- Stark in an episode of One Step Beyond (1961)
- Born: Graham William Stark; 20 January 1922; Wallasey, Cheshire, England
- Died: 29 October 2013 (aged 91); London, England
- Occupations: Comedian; actor; writer; director
- Years active: 1939–1999
- Spouse: Audrey Nicholson (m. 1959)
- Children: 3

Graham William Stark (20 January 1922 – 29 October 2013) was an English comedian, actor, writer and director, known for his close friendship with actor Peter Sellers and appearances in several films by director Blake Edwards, including several of The Pink Panther films and Victor/Victoria.

== Early life ==
The son of a purser on transatlantic liners, Stark was born, on 20 January 1922, in New Brighton (part of Wallasey) in Wirral, Cheshire, England. He attended Wallasey Grammar School and made his professional stage debut aged 13 in pantomime at the Lyceum Theatre in London.

During the Second World War he served in the RAF entertaining troops in North Africa, Burma, Italy and Germany. While there he first met Dick Emery, Tony Hancock and Peter Sellers, the latter two as fellow members of Ralph Reader's Gang Shows. Sellers would become a long-lasting close friend. With the Gang Shows, Stark toured the locations where military personnel were seeing active service. After the war he studied at the Royal Academy of Dramatic Art, and joined the regulars at Grafton's, a pub in Victoria run by Jimmy Grafton, a venue at which soon-to-be-prominent entertainers of the next few decades regularly gathered.

== Career ==
Stark began to work on BBC Radio in the postwar years, helped by Tony Hancock's connections, making his debut in Happy Go Lucky and going on to Ray's a Laugh, thanks to the intervention of Sellers. For a time, Stark was a regular in Educating Archie, and substituted for Spike Milligan on The Goon Show when the comedian was ill. Stark was a regular supporting player on TV with Sellers in A Show Called Fred and Son of Fred, and with Benny Hill. Stark's profile was sufficient for him to gain his own, albeit short-lived, sketch series, The Graham Stark Show (BBC 1964). Now entirely lost, it was scripted by Johnny Speight with each episode featuring a different group of supporting actors, including Deryck Guyler, Arthur Mullard, Derek Nimmo, Patricia Hayes and Warren Mitchell. An episode of Till Death Us Do Part, called "In Sickness and in Health", 1967, where Stark plays decrepit Dr. Kelly, survives. In 1970 Stark was given his own radio sketch show, entitled Stark Raving. It was broadcast on BBC Radio 2 and consisted of a single series of six episodes.

Adept at comic French accents, Stark stole scenes as a hapless gendarme in Hammer's 1961 comedy A Weekend with Lulu. He became a regular performer in the Pink Panther film series. His first role in the series was as Hercule Lajoy, Inspector Clouseau's stonefaced assistant, in A Shot in the Dark (1964). Along with Herbert Lom and Burt Kwouk, he appeared in more Pink Panther films than any other actor, playing a variety of characters, including reprising Lajoy in Trail of the Pink Panther (1982) and twice playing Dr Auguste Balls (in Revenge of the Pink Panther, 1978; and Son of the Pink Panther, 1993). He was cast as the hotel clerk in the "Does your dog bite" scene in The Pink Panther Strikes Again. Stark, as well as Lom and Kwouk, each appeared in seven titles from the series.

In the film Alfie (1966), Stark was Humphrey, a timid bus conductor who takes on a woman (Julia Foster) and her child when the title character (played by Michael Caine) refuses commitment. He also played the role of Lord Fortnum's physician, Captain Pontius Kak, in the original stage play of The Bedsitting Room, which opened at the Mermaid Theatre on 31 January 1963. Following the sudden death of James Beck in 1973, Stark took over the role of Private Joe Walker for the remainder of episodes in the first series of the radio adaptation of Dad's Army.

In 1982, Stark appeared in a cameo role as a butler, alongside Dandy Nichols, in the music video for Adam Ant's UK No. 1 hit "Goody Two Shoes". He played the character of Mr Nadget in the 1994 BBC adaptation of Martin Chuzzlewit.

== Personal life ==
In 1959 he married Audrey Nicholson, who survived him with their two sons and a daughter. Peter Sellers was their godfather. Christiane Kubrick is their godmother. Stark was also an accomplished stills photographer. He was the last known performer to have appeared on The Goon Show during its original run. In 2003 he published an autobiography, Stark Naked. He associated with people such as Blake Edwards, Julie Andrews, Yul Brynner, Julie Christie, Stanley Kubrick, Sidney Poitier, Jack Palance, Kim Basinger, Sean Connery, Tony Curtis, and Ringo Starr.

He died in London on 29 October 2013 at age 91, after suffering a stroke.

== Filmography as actor ==
- The Spy in Black (1939) as Bell Boy (uncredited)
- Ça c'est du cinéma (1951) (voice, uncredited)
- Emergency Call (1952) as Posh Charlie
- Down Among the Z Men (1952) as Spider
- Behind the Headlines (1953 film) as crook (uncredited)
- Forces' Sweetheart (1953) as Simmonds
- Flannelfoot (1953) as Ginger
- The Super Secret Service (1953) as Carstairs
- Johnny on the Spot (1954) as Stevie
- The Sea Shall Not Have Them (1954) as Corporal (uncredited)
- One Good Turn (1955) as Boxing Competitor (uncredited)
- They Never Learn (1956) as Plum
- The Running Jumping & Standing Still Film (1959) (uncredited)
- Inn for Trouble (1960) as Charlie (Driver)
- Sink the Bismarck! (1960) as Petty Officer Williams (uncredited)
- The Millionairess (1960) as Butler
- A Weekend with Lulu (1961) as Chiron
- Double Bunk (1961) as Flowerman
- Dentist on the Job (1961) as Sourfaced Man
- Watch It, Sailor! (1961) as Carnoustie Bligh
- On the Fiddle (1961) as Sgt. Ellis
- Only Two Can Play (1962) as Hyman
- Operation Snatch (1962) as Soldier
- A Pair of Briefs (1962) as Police Witness
- Village of Daughters (1962) as Postman
- She'll Have to Go (1962) as Arnold
- The Wrong Arm of the Law (1963) as Sid Cooper
- The Mouse on the Moon (1963) as Standard Bearer
- Lancelot and Guinevere (1963) as Rian
- Strictly for the Birds (1963) as Hartley
- Ladies Who Do (1963) as Foreman
- Becket (1964) as Pope's Secretary (uncredited)
- A Shot in the Dark (1964) as Hercule Lajoy
- Guns at Batasi (1964) as Sgt. 'Dodger' Brown
- Go Kart Go (1964) as Policeman
- Those Magnificent Men in Their Flying Machines (1965) as Fireman
- San Ferry Ann (1965) as Gendarme
- You Must Be Joking! (1965) as McGregor's friend
- Runaway Railway (1965) as Grample
- Alfie (1966) as Humphrey
- The Wrong Box (1966) as Ian Scott Fife
- Finders Keepers (1966) as Burke
- Casino Royale (1967) as Cashier
- Rocket to the Moon (1967) as Grundle
- The Plank (1967) as Amorous Van Driver (Harry Nichols)
- A Ghost of a Chance (1967) as Thomas Dogood
- Salt and Pepper (1968) as Sgt. Walters
- The Picasso Summer (1969) as Postman
- The Magic Christian (1969) as Waiter
- Rhubarb (1969) as Golf Pro. Rhubarb
- Start the Revolution Without Me (1970) as Andre Coupe
- Doctor in Trouble (1970) as Satterjee
- Scramble (1970) (uncredited)
- Simon, Simon (1970) as 1st Workman
- The Magnificent Seven Deadly Sins (1971) as Guest Appearance (segment "Sloth") (uncredited)
- Hide and Seek (1972) as Milkman
- A Day at the Beach (1972) as Pipi
- Not Now, Darling (1973) as Painter (uncredited)
- Secrets of a Door-to-Door Salesman (1973) as Charlie Vincent
- Where's Johnny? (1974) as Professor Graham
- The Return of the Pink Panther (1975) as Pepi
- I'm Not Feeling Myself Tonight (1976) as Hotel M.C.
- Pure as a Lily (1976) as Detective Mike
- The Pink Panther Strikes Again (1976) as Hotel Clerk
- Gulliver's Travels (1977) (voice)
- Hardcore (1977) as Inspector Flaubert
- The Prince and the Pauper (1977) as Jester
- Let's Get Laid (1978) as Inspector Nugent
- What's Up Nurse! (1978) as Carthew
- Revenge of the Pink Panther (1978) as Professor Auguste Balls
- The Prisoner of Zenda (1979) as Erik
- Le Pétomane (1979) as Defence Counsel
- There Goes the Bride (1980) as Bernardo Rossi, Headwaiter
- The Sea Wolves (1980) as Manners
- Hawk the Slayer (1980) as Sparrow
- Victor/Victoria (1982) as Waiter
- Trail of the Pink Panther (1982) as Hercule Lajoy
- Superman III (1983) as Blind Man
- Curse of the Pink Panther (1983) as Bored Waiter
- Bloodbath at the House of Death (1984) as Blind Man
- Blind Date (1987) as Jordan the Butler
- Jane and the Lost City (1987) as Tombs
- Son of the Pink Panther (1993) as Professor Auguste Balls
- The Incredible Adventures of Marco Polo (1998) as Old King
