= Trail of the Pink Panther =

1982 comedy film by Blake Edwards

- Theatrical release poster
- Directed by: Blake Edwards
- Screenplay by: Frank Waldman; Tom Waldman; Blake Edwards; Geoffrey Edwards
- Story by: Blake Edwards
- Produced by: Blake Edwards; Tony Adams; Animation: Marvel Productions
- Starring: Peter Sellers; David Niven; Herbert Lom; Richard Mulligan; Joanna Lumley; Capucine; Robert Loggia; Harvey Korman; Burt Kwouk
- Cinematography: Dick Bush
- Edited by: Alan Jones
- Music by: Henry Mancini
- Production companies: United Artists; Blake Edwards Entertainment; Titan Productions
- Distributed by: MGM/UA Entertainment Company (United States); United International Pictures (International)
- Release dates: 2 December 1982 (Australia); 16 December 1982 (United Kingdom); 17 December 1982 (United States)
- Running time: 96 minutes
- Countries: United States; United Kingdom
- Language: English
- Budget: $6 million
- Box office: $9.1 million (U.S.)

Trail of the Pink Panther is a 1982 comedy film directed by Blake Edwards and starring Peter Sellers. It is the seventh film in The Pink Panther series, the first film in the series following Sellers' death and also the last in which he appeared as Inspector Clouseau. Sellers died 18 months before production began; his performance consists entirely of his deleted scenes and outtakes from previous films. Although the Sellers estate sued United Artists and the use of the footage was ruled illegal, the film was allowed to be released. The newly shot material in the film stars Joanna Lumley as journalist Marie Jouvet searching for the missing Clouseau and running afoul of the inspector's enemies who do not wish to see him return. The film was also the first installment in the franchise to be released by Metro-Goldwyn-Mayer following its merger with United Artists, the franchise's original owner and distributor, a year earlier.

== Plot ==
When the famous Pink Panther diamond is stolen again from Lugash, Chief Inspector Clouseau is called on the case despite protests by Chief Inspector Dreyfus. While on the case, Clouseau is pursued by the Mafia. Clouseau first goes to London to interrogate Sir Charles Litton (having forgotten that he lives in Southern France). Travelling to the airport, he accidentally blows up his car trying to fix a pop-out lighter, but mistakenly believes it an assassination attempt, and disguises himself in a heavy cast on the flight, which causes complications in the air and on land. He then is led to an awkward introduction to the Scotland Yard detectives at Heathrow Airport. Meanwhile, Dreyfus learns from Scotland Yard that Libyan terrorists have marked Clouseau for assassination, but permits him to continue. At the hotel, Clouseau has a miscommunication with the hotel clerk and gets knocked out a window several times, trying to get his message from Dreyfus.

Clouseau's flight disappears over the ocean en route to Lugash, and Marie Jouvet, a television reporter covering the story, sets out to interview those who knew him best. Among the people she interviews are Dreyfus; Hercule Lajoy; Cato Fong; and former jewel thief Sir Charles Litton, who is married to Clouseau's ex-wife Lady Simone.

All of these interview scenes provide flashbacks to scenes of earlier Pink Panther films (The Pink Panther, A Shot in the Dark, The Return of the Pink Panther, The Pink Panther Strikes Again, and Revenge of the Pink Panther); but Jouvet also interviews Clouseau's father, at his winery in the south of France, providing glimpses of Clouseau's childhood, and his early career during college, nearly leading him to commit suicide after a girl of his dreams marries another person, and in the French Resistance involving him failing to detonate a bridge full of crossing Nazis. Jouvet also questions Mafia don Bruno Langlois, a mafia boss antagonist who would appear in the next film, and tries to file a complaint against him with Chief Inspector Dreyfus; but Dreyfus refuses to press charges.

The film ends with Jouvet hoping that Clouseau might be alive somewhere, as she states: "Did Inspector Clouseau really perish in the sea, as reported? Or for reasons as yet unknown, is he out there someplace, plotting his next move, waiting to reveal himself when the time is right? I am reluctant to believe that misfortune has really struck down such a great man." Clouseau is seen glancing over a seaside cliff, when a seagull flies over and defecates on the sleeve of his coat. The words "Swine seagull!" are heard in the distinctive exaggerated French accent of Clouseau.

The next shot shows the animated Pink Panther in trench coat and trilby hat, revealed to be in place of Clouseau watching the sunset; he turns around to face the camera and flashes his coat open, but his trench coat reveals a montage of clips of Peter Sellers from his five Pink Panther films as a tribute to him, while the end credits roll.

== Cast ==
- Joanna Lumley as Marie Jouvet
- Herbert Lom as Chief Inspector Charles Dreyfus
- David Niven as Sir Charles Litton. Niven reprises his role from the original film, replacing Christopher Plummer from the third film.
  - Niven's lines were dubbed by impressionist Rich Little due to Niven's declining health
- André Maranne as Sgt. François Chevalier
- Robert Loggia as Bruno Langlois
- Richard Mulligan as Monsieur Clouseau, Clouseau's estranged father
- Burt Kwouk as Cato Fong
- Capucine as Lady Simone Litton, Charles' wife. Capucine reprises her role from the first film, in which Simone was originally Jacques Clouseau's wife, whereas Catherine Schell played Lady Claudine Litton in the third film.
- Graham Stark as Hercule Lajoy. Stark, who previously portrayed various characters throughout the films such as Pepi in the third film, a hotel receptionist in the fourth film and Auguste Balls in the fifth film, reprises his role from A Shot in the Dark.
- Ronald Fraser as Dr Longet
- Colin Blakely as Alec Drummond
- Peter Arne as Col. Bufoni
- Harold Kasket as President of Lugash
- Daniel Peacock as Clouseau age 18
- Lucca Mezzofanti as Clouseau age 8
- Denise Crosby as Denise, Bruno's moll

=== Previously unseen footage only ===
- Peter Sellers as Chief Inspector Jacques Clouseau
- Harvey Korman as Prof. Auguste Balls. Korman replaces Graham Stark, who played Balls in the sixth film and who reprises his role as Hercule Lajoy from A Shot in the Dark
- Leonard Rossiter as Superintendent Quinlan
- Dudley Sutton as Inspector McLaren
- Marne Maitland as Deputy Commissioner Lasorde
- Liz Smith as Martha
- Harold Berens as Hotel Clerk
- Claire Davenport as Hotel Maid

=== Previously seen footage only ===
- Robert Wagner as George Litton
- Claudia Cardinale as Princess Dala
- Colin Gordon as Tucker

== Production ==
Sellers died in late July 1980, a year and a half before production began. After Sellers died, UA tried to get Dudley Moore to take on Clouseau in the Sellers-penned Romance of the Pink Panther. Moore refused to do it without Edwards directing and was willing to play Clouseau only one time as a tribute to Sellers (knowing Romance was to have ended the series, according to a Los Angeles Times interview with Moore in 1980). UA wanted the series to continue, but Edwards refused to cast another actor as Clouseau, recalling the negative reception that Inspector Clouseau (1968) suffered upon release (The production featured Alan Arkin in the title role and was made without the involvement of Edwards and Sellers), and also believing that no one could actually, realistically and believably replace him in that role.

Edwards instead opted to reconstruct Sellers's performance from deleted scenes from The Pink Panther Strikes Again. Frank and Tom Waldman wrote the screenplays for both The Trail of the Pink Panther and its sequel Curse of the Pink Panther together, and they were produced back-to-back on a $17 million budget. Principal photography began on February 15, 1982, at Pinewood Studios and concluded on June 15, 1982, in Paris. Additional filming took place in Nice, Valencia, Ibiza, Cortina d'Ampezzo, and Casablanca. The shooting in Valencia was guarded by the Spanish National Police Corps and the United States Secret Service due to the involvement of President Ronald Reagan's daughter Patti Davis. Footage of the fictional country of Lugash was filmed in Paris, including the Basilica of Sacré-Cœur in Montmartre.

David Niven appears in the film, reprising his role of Sir Charles Lytton, which he first played in the original The Pink Panther of 1963. His new footage was filmed at Victorine Studios in Nice, with the Château de Bellet and the Château Castellaras standing in for his French Riviera estate. Niven was in the early stages of ALS, and his voice subsequently proved too weak to loop his own dialogue during post-production; as a result, his lines were dubbed by impressionist Rich Little. Other returning series regulars include Herbert Lom as Chief Inspector Dreyfus, Graham Stark as Hercule LaJoy (last seen in the 1964 Pink Panther film A Shot in the Dark), Burt Kwouk as Clouseau's faithful man servant Cato and André Maranne as Sgt. François Chevalier. Trail featured the animated opening and closing credits, animated by Marvel Productions. Director Blake Edwards dedicated the film to Sellers, "the one and only Inspector Clouseau."

Despite the dedication, Sellers's widow Lynne Frederick filed a $3 million lawsuit against the film's producers and MGM/UA, claiming that the film diminished Sellers's reputation, and was awarded over $1 million in damages. Despite this, however, there was a practical reason behind Frederick's suing of Edwards. Her primary objection was that Sellers had actually vetoed the use of outtakes from earlier Panthers in his lifetime and that his estate should have had the right to control the use of outtakes after his death. The reason the question of outtakes being used had come up in Sellers's lifetime was that Edwards had shot and edited a two-hour and six-minute version of Strikes Again, hoping to recapture the zany spectacle of The Great Race, with Dreyfus as the melodramatic villain in the fashion of Jack Lemmon's Professor Fate. United Artists vetoed this long version and the film was drastically cut from two hours to just over an hour and a half. There were rumors for a time that a three hour cut existed as well, but Strikes Again's novelization clears this all up as, apart from some minor deviations, it contains all of the deleted scenes that were ultimately used in Trail, which only total to about 23 minutes and no other additions that would total to an extra hour's worth of footage are present in the novel.

A London court subsequently ruled that the use of footage was illegal and awarded Frederick $1.475 million in damages but declined to bar the release of the film.

== Original plans ==
After Arthur made Dudley Moore a huge star, he was unwilling to talk about committing to a film series. MGM/UA wanted a transition film if Edwards was to introduce a new character as the series' star. Using outtakes was, according to Edwards, a brilliant idea (shooting scripts for Return, Strikes Again, and Revenge demonstrate a great amount of comedic material from the three films that was left on the cutting room floor). Edwards had originally hoped to construct a Citizen Kane-esque narrative, with Clouseau having gone missing at the very beginning of the story, whilst the memories of the supporting characters would showcase the deleted or unused content. Unfortunately, MGM/UA refused to pay ITC the fee they were asking for the use of the Return outtakes, and Edwards fell behind schedule on shooting Trail/Curse (MGM/UA also ended up cutting both films' budgets considerably), with the result being that Trail failed to live up to its potential.

Edwards's wife, Julie Andrews, has an unbilled cameo as a cleaning lady, dressed as her friend Carol Burnett's charwoman character.

== Soundtrack ==
Unusually the soundtrack album by Henry Mancini featured a compilation of themes from other Pink Panther movies, with only "Trail Of The Pink Panther (Main Title)" and "The Easy Life In Paris" being from the film itself. The other tracks included "It Had Better Be Tonight (Meglio Stasera)" (from The Pink Panther), the title theme from A Shot in the Dark, "The Return Of The Pink Panther (Parts I And II)" and "The Greatest Gift" (from The Return of the Pink Panther), "Come To Me", "The Inspector Clouseau Theme" and "Bier Fest Polka" (from The Pink Panther Strikes Again), and "Simone", "After the Shower" and "Hong Kong Fireworks" (from Revenge of the Pink Panther).

The soundtrack album for the film was released by Liberty Records (LT-51139).

== Release ==
The film was released in the United Kingdom from 16 December 1982. It opened in the United States on 17 December 1982.

== Reception ==
The film was a critical failure. Although the film was marketed as a tribute to Sellers, the sequel was universally disdained. On review aggregator Rotten Tomatoes, the film has an approval rating of 23% based on 13 reviews, with an average score of 4.30/10. On Metacritic, the film has a weighted average score of 43 out of 100 based on 8 critics, indicating "mixed or average reviews".

It was released for Christmas 1982 and grossed only $9 million – $27,294,248.70 in 2022 dollars ($1,341,695 on opening weekend in 800 theaters; $3,247,458 on opening week) against its $6 million budget. In contrast, the previous film in the series, Revenge of the Pink Panther, had made over $49 million. Nonetheless, it was soon followed by a further Pink Panther film, Curse of the Pink Panther, which was shot concurrently with Trail. That film did not feature Peter Sellers at all (with the exception of some archival voice work, for which he was not given credit) and instead featured Ted Wass as Clouseau's replacement Clifton Sleigh. The latter film was also a critical and commercial disaster.
