= Lugash =

Lugash can refer to

- Lugash, a fictional country in The Pink Panther film series, including The Return of the Pink Panther
- Coach Lugash, a fictional character in The Simpsons television series
