= The Pink Panther Strikes Again =

1976 American-British comedy film by Blake Edwards

- Theatrical release poster
- Directed by: Blake Edwards
- Written by: Frank Waldman; Blake Edwards
- Produced by: Blake Edwards
- Starring: Peter Sellers; Herbert Lom; Colin Blakely; Leonard Rossiter; Lesley-Anne Down
- Cinematography: Harry Waxman
- Edited by: Alan Jones
- Music by: Henry Mancini
- Production companies: Amjo Productions; Animation: Richard Williams Studio
- Distributed by: United Artists
- Release dates: 15 December 1976 (United States); 17 December 1976 (United Kingdom)
- Running time: 103 minutes
- Countries: United Kingdom; United States
- Language: English
- Budget: $6 million
- Box office: $75 million

The Pink Panther Strikes Again is a 1976 crime comedy film, produced, co-written and directed by Blake Edwards. It is the fifth installment in The Pink Panther series, starring Peter Sellers as Inspector Clouseau.

== Plot ==
After three years confinement in a psychiatric hospital, former Chief Inspector of the Sûreté Charles Dreyfus has recovered his sanity and has been cured of his obsession with killing Inspector Jacques Clouseau, who has replaced Dreyfus as Chief Inspector. Dreyfus is elated when informed by his psychiatrist that he is to appear before the sanity board that afternoon pending release. Clouseau arrives unannounced to speak on behalf of his former boss, promptly subjects Dreyfus to a series of mishaps and within five minutes manages to drive him insane again.

Dreyfus later escapes from the hospital and again attempts to kill Clouseau by planting a bomb in Clouseau's apartment block while the chief inspector (by periodic arrangement) duels with his manservant Cato. Although the bomb destroys Clouseau's apartment and injures Cato, Clouseau, as usual, manages to escape uninjured. Deciding that a more elaborate plan is needed to eliminate Clouseau, Dreyfus enlists the help of several career criminals and abducts professor Hugo Fassbender, a renowned nuclear physicist, and his daughter Margo. Dreyfus forces Fassbender to build a "doomsday weapon" in exchange for their freedom.

Clouseau travels to Britain to aid Scotland Yard in the investigation of the kidnapping. While in the Fassbender home, Clouseau wreaks havoc when attempting to interrogate the domestic staff, including Jarvis, Fassbender's cross-dressing butler. After Jarvis is killed by the kidnappers, to whom he had become a dangerous witness, Clouseau discovers a clue that leads him to the Oktoberfest in Munich. Meanwhile, Dreyfus appears on worldwide television, warning of a possible holocaust and as a demonstration of the incredible power he possesses, the United Nations Building in New York City, will vanish from the face of the earth. One week later, the UN building is disintegrated using Fassbender's doomsday weapon and Dreyfus threatens to destroy an entire city unless Clouseau is eliminated. In response, several nations order their operatives to Munich to assassinate Clouseau in hopes of gaining Dreyfus's favour and possibly Fassbender's invention. As a result of their orders and Clouseau's obliviousness and ineptitude, all of the assassins kill each other until only the agents of the Soviet Union and Egypt remain.

One of Dreyfus's henchmen, disguised as Clouseau, is killed by the Egyptian assassin after being mistaken for Clouseau. The Egyptian is seduced by Russian operative Olga Bariosova, who makes the same mistake and falls in love with him. After the Egyptian hitman departs, the real Clouseau returns to his hotel room. He is surprised to find Olga in his bed and is perplexed by her affections. With her help, Clouseau ascertains that Dreyfus is hiding out at a castle in Bavaria and immediately goes there. After his arrival, Clouseau's initial attempts to sneak into the castle are foiled by his usual ineptitude.

Dreyfus, meanwhile, is suffering from a toothache but is elated by the erroneous report of Clouseau's demise. After learning that a dentist is needed at the castle, Clouseau disguises himself as an elderly German dentist and finally gains entry to the castle. Unrecognised by Dreyfus, Clouseau intoxicates both of them with nitrous oxide. While both are laughing uncontrollably, Clouseau mistakenly pulls the wrong tooth and Dreyfus immediately deduces that the inept dentist is Clouseau in disguise. Clouseau escapes, and a vengeful Dreyfus prepares to use the machine to destroy England. Clouseau, eluding Dreyfus's henchmen, unwittingly foils Dreyfus's plans when a medieval catapult outside the castle launches him on top of the doomsday machine, causing it to malfunction and fire on Dreyfus and the castle. As the occupants of the disintegrating castle, including Fassbender, Margo, and Clouseau escape, Dreyfus plays "Tiptoe Through the Tulips" on the castle's pipe organ before he and the castle vanish into thin air.

Returning to Paris, Clouseau finds Olga waiting for him in his bed. However, their tryst is interrupted first by Clouseau's apparent inability to remove his clothes, and then by Cato's latest surprise attack, which causes all three to be hurled into the river Seine when the reclining bed snaps back upright and crashes through the wall. Immediately thereafter, a cartoon image of Clouseau emerges from the water, unaware that a gigantic Pink Panther, jaws agape, is waiting below (a reference to the recent film Jaws). The animated Clouseau chases the Pink Panther up the Seine.

== Cast ==
- Peter Sellers as Chief Inspector Jacques Clouseau
- Herbert Lom as Former Chief Inspector Charles Dreyfus
- Lesley-Anne Down as Olga Bariosava
- Burt Kwouk as Cato Fong
- André Maranne as François
- Leonard Rossiter as Superintendent Quinlan
- Colin Blakely as Inspector Alec Drummond
- Dudley Sutton as Inspector McLaren
- Michael Robbins as Ainsley Jarvis
- Richard Vernon as Professor Hugo Fassbender
- Briony McRoberts as Margo Fassbender
- Vanda Godsell as Mrs. Dawn Leverlilly
- Tony Sympson as Mr. Bob Shork
- Patsy Smart as Mrs. Mimi Japonica
- Norman Mitchell as Mr. Gregory Bullock
- George Leech as Mr. Hank Stutterstutt
- Dick Crockett as President of the United States
- Byron Kane as US Secretary of State
- Paul Maxwell as CIA Director
- Robert Beatty as US Navy Admiral
- Geoffrey Bayldon as Dr. Jean Duval
- Graham Stark as Alpenros Hotel Clerk
- John Sullivan as Tournier
- Gordon Rollings as Inmate
- John Clive as Chuck
- Cyd Child as Bouncer
- Damaris Hayman as Fiona
- April Walker as Pretty Lady in Hallway
- Anthony Chinn as Chinese Assassin
- Deep Roy as Diminutive Assassin
- Herb Tanney as Norwegian Assassin (as Sado Tanney)

=== Cast notes ===
- ABC News anchorman and journalist Howard K. Smith appeared in the film as himself but his scenes were cut, though his name remains in the film's credits.
- Julie Andrews, the wife of director Blake Edwards, provided the singing voice for the female impersonator Ainsley Jarvis.
- Graham Stark, a longtime friend of Sellers, appears in a small role as the desk clerk of a Bavarian hotel. Since his role as Hercule LaJoy in A Shot in the Dark, he had appeared in small roles in every Pink Panther sequel except Inspector Clouseau, in which Sellers did not play Clouseau.
- Scenes featuring Harvey Korman as Professor Auguste Balls and Marne Maitland as deputy commissioner Lasorde were deleted from the film, but were later seen in Trail of the Pink Panther in 1982. Stark would assume the role of Professor Balls in the next film, Revenge of the Pink Panther (1978).
- Omar Sharif appears uncredited as the Egyptian assassin.
- Tom Jones sings the Oscar-nominated song "Come to Me".
- Maud Adams had filmed a few scenes as the Soviet assassin, Olga Bariosova, but was fired after she refused to appear nude; she was replaced by Lesley-Anne Down and the completed scenes with Adams were reshot. Edwards had intended to replace Adams with Nicola Pagett after seeing her in Upstairs, Downstairs but instead hired Down, Pagett's castmate.
- Dick Crockett appears as the unnamed President of the United States who is based on then-current U.S. president Gerald Ford. Crockett bore a marked physical and vocal resemblance to Ford, whose exaggerated reputation for clumsiness as depicted in the film was a national joke at that time. The president's unnamed sombre Secretary of State (portrayed by Byron Kane) is based on secretary of state Henry Kissinger.

== Production ==
After The Return of the Pink Panther turned out to be a surprise hit, United Artists rushed The Pink Panther Strikes Again into production. Blake Edwards had adapted one of two scripts that he and Frank Waldman had written for a proposed Pink Panther television series as the basis for that film, and he adapted the other as the starting point for The Pink Panther Strikes Again. As a result, it is the only Pink Panther sequel that has a storyline (Dreyfus in the insane asylum) that directly follows that of the previous film. The plot does not concern the famous Pink Panther diamond of previous films, but is played more as a James Bond parody.

The film was in production from December 1975 to September 1976, with principal photography taking place between February and 4 July 1976.The film was shot in London; Shepperton Studios in Surrey, England; Munich; and Paris. The production saw the construction of a full-scale replica of the White House Oval Office at Shepperton Studios, while the Doomsday Machine was designed by engineers from Sony.

The strained relationship between Sellers and Edwards had further deteriorated by the time production of The Pink Panther Strikes Again was underway. Sellers was ailing both mentally and physically and Edwards later commented on the actor's mental state during production of the film: "If you went to an asylum and you described the first inmate you saw, that's what Peter had become. He was certifiable."

The original cut of the film ran for about 126 minutes but was edited to 103 minutes for theatrical release. Edwards originally conceived The Pink Panther Strikes Again as an even longer 180-minute epic, zany chase film, in a similar vein to his earlier comedy The Great Race, but the longer version was vetoed by UA and the film was kept to a more conventional length. The excised footage was later used in Trail of the Pink Panther. This can be confirmed by the film's novelisation which, aside from some minor differences, includes all of the deleted scenes that were ultimately used in Trail (three of which, via minor voice dubbing, have different dialogue than what appeared in the novel)

During the film's title sequence, there are references to television's Alfred Hitchcock Presents and Batman, the movie serials of the 1940s, as well as the films King Kong, The Sound of Music (starring Edwards' wife Julie Andrews), Dracula, Singin' in the Rain, Steamboat Bill, Jr. and Sweet Charity, placing the Pink Panther character and the animated persona of Inspector Clouseau into recognisable scenes from the films. There is also a reference to Jaws in the ending credits sequence. The scene in which Clouseau impersonates a dentist who uses laughing gas and extracts the wrong tooth is inspired by Bob Hope's role in The Paleface (1948).

Richard Williams (later of Who Framed Roger Rabbit fame) supervised the animation of the opening and closing sequences for the second and final time; original animators DePatie-Freleng Enterprises would return on the next film with animation influenced by Williams's style. Sellers was unhappy with the final cut of the film and publicly criticised Edwards for misusing his talents. Their tense relationship is noted in Revenge of the Pink Panther's opening credits that list it as a "Sellers-Edwards" production. French comic-book writer René Goscinny, the original writer of the Asterix series, was reportedly trying to sue Edwards for plagiarism in 1977 after noticing strong similarities to Goscinny's script titled Le maître du monde (The Master of the World), which he had sent to Sellers in 1975.

== Release ==
The film was released in 600 theatres in the United States and Canada on December 15, 1976.

== Reception ==
On review aggregator Rotten Tomatoes, the film has an approval rating of 75% based on 24 reviews, with an average score of 7.30/10. The film earned theatrical rentals of $19.5 million in the United States and Canada from a gross of $33.8 million. Internationally, it earned rentals of $10.5 million for a worldwide total of $30 million. By March 1978, the film had grossed $75 million worldwide and was hoping to earn another $8 million by the end of the year.

Roger Ebert of the Chicago Sun-Times awarded the film two and a half stars out of four and wrote, "If I'm less than totally enthusiastic about The Pink Panther Strikes Again, maybe it was because I've been over this ground with Clouseau many times before," stating that a time would have to come "when inspiration gives way to habit, and I think the Pink Panther series is just about at that point. That's not to say this film isn't funny—it has moments as good as anything Sellers and Edwards have ever done—but that it's time for them to move on. They worked together once on the funniest movie either one has ever done, The Party. Now it's time to try something new again."

Vincent Canby of The New York Times wrote that the characters of Clouseau and Dreyfus "were made for each other," and further stated, "I'm not sure why Mr. Sellers and Mr. Lom are such a hilarious team, though it may be because each is a fine comic actor with a special talent for portraying the sort of all-consuming, epic self-absorption that makes slapstick farce initially acceptable—instead of alarming—and finally so funny." Canby also enjoyed Clouseau's French accent, and wrote, "Both Mr. Sellers and Mr. Edwards delight in old gags, and part of the joy of The Pink Panther Strikes Again is watching the way they spin out what is essentially a single routine".

== Awards and nominations ==
| Award | Category | Nominee(s) | Result | Ref. |
|---|---|---|---|---|
| Academy Awards | Best Original Song | "Come to Me"; Music by Henry Mancini; Lyrics by Don Black | Nominated | |
| Evening Standard British Film Awards | Best Comedy | Blake Edwards | Won | |
| Golden Globe Awards | Best Motion Picture – Musical or Comedy | | Nominated | |
| Golden Globe Awards | Best Actor in a Motion Picture – Musical or Comedy | Peter Sellers | Nominated | |
| Writers Guild of America Awards | Best Comedy – Adapted from Another Medium | Frank Waldman and Blake Edwards | Won | |

American Film Institute Lists

- AFI's 100 Years...100 Laughs – Nominated
- AFI's 100 Years...100 Movie Quotes:
  - "Does your dog bite?" – Nominated

== Play adaptation ==
Around 1981, the film was adapted into a play by William Gleason, mostly for high-school or community-theatre productions. The storyline bears similarities to that of the film, although some locations are changed, and women dressed as pink panthers also perform scene changes.
