= The Pink Panther (soundtrack) =

The Pink Panther: Music from the Film Score Composed and Conducted by Henry Mancini

Soundtrack album by Henry Mancini
- Released: 1964
- Recorded: September 16–18, 1963
- Studios: RCA Victor (Hollywood, California)
- Genre: Soundtrack
- Length: 28:58
- Label: RCA Victor
- Producer: Joe Reisman

Singles from The Pink Panther: Music from the Film Score Composed and Conducted by Henry Mancini
- 1. "The Pink Panther Theme" Released: 1964

The Pink Panther: Music from the Film Score Composed and Conducted by Henry Mancini is a soundtrack album from the 1963 movie The Pink Panther starring David Niven and Peter Sellers. The music was composed and conducted by Henry Mancini.

The album entered Billboard magazine's pop album chart on April 25, 1964, peaked at No. 8, and remained on the chart for 41 weeks.

The title song, "The Pink Panther Theme" was released as a single. It reached the Top 10 on the U.S. Billboard adult contemporary chart. The distinctive tenor saxophone of Plas Johnson is heard on the main title theme music.

The album and title song were nominated for the Grammy Awards for Best Album or Original Score and Best Pop Instrumental Performance. It was also nominated for an Academy Award for best score, losing out to Mary Poppins.

AllMusic gave the album a rating of four-and-a-half stars. Reviewer Stephen Cook called it a fine soundtrack and concluded: "This is a great title for fans of Mancini's lounge/soundtrack material, but those more into his jazz material should consider either his Peter Gunn or Combo soundtracks."

In 2001, the soundtrack album was awarded a Grammy Hall of Fame Award. In 2005, the score was listed at #20 on AFI's 100 Years of Film Scores.

== Track listing ==
All songs written by Henry Mancini, except where noted.

Side one
No.	Title	Length
1.	"The Pink Panther Theme"	2:37
2.	"It Had Better Be Tonight (Meglio Stasera)" (instrumental version)	1:46
3.	"Royal Blue"	3:11
4.	"Champagne and Quail"	2:45
5.	"The Village Inn"	2:36
6.	"The Tiber Twist"	2:50

Side two
No.	Title	Writer(s)	Length
1.	"It Had Better Be Tonight (Meglio Stasera)" (vocal version)	Henry Mancini; Johnny Mercer	1:57
2.	"Cortina"		1:55
3.	"The Lonely Princess"		2:28
4.	"Something for Sellers"		2:49
5.	"Piano and Strings"		2:38
6.	"Shades of Sennett"		1:26

== Personnel ==
- Plas Johnson – tenor saxophone
- Gene Cipriano, Harry Klee, Ronny Lang, Ted Nash – flute, saxophones
- Frank Beach, Conrad Gozzo, Jack Sheldon, Ray Triscari – trumpets
- Karl DeKarske, Dick Nash, Jimmy Priddy – trombones
- John Halliburton – bass trombone
- Al Hendrickson – guitar
- Larry Bunker, Frank Flynn – vibes and percussion
- Jimmy Rowles – piano
- Rolly Bundock – bass
- Shelly Manne – drums
- Carl Fortina – accordion
- Ramon Rivera - congas, percussion

== Certifications ==
Region	Certification	Certified units/sales
United States (RIAA)	Gold	500,000^{^}
^{^} Shipments figures based on certification alone.
