= Frank Waldman =

American screenwriter (1919–1990)

- Born: March 15, 1919; Chicago, Illinois, U.S.
- Died: September 5, 1990 (aged 71); Los Angeles, California, U.S.
- Occupation: TV/film screenwriter
- Years active: 1944-1982

Frank Waldman (March 15, 1919 – September 5, 1990) was an American screenwriter who frequently worked with Blake Edwards and his brother Tom Waldman.

Waldman was born in Chicago, Illinois. He wrote for the documentary series This Is Tom Jones, as well as episodes for Peter Gunn, I Dream of Jeannie, McHale's Navy, Bewitched, Gilligan's Island, The Greatest Show on Earth, and The Judy Garland Show.

The Waldman brothers were the sole credited writers of the script for the 41st Academy Awards.

== Selected filmography ==
- Bathing Beauty (1944 )
- High Time (1960)
- Love Is a Ball (1963)
- The Party (1968)
- Inspector Clouseau (1968)
- The Return of the Pink Panther (1975)
- The Pink Panther Strikes Again (1976)
- Revenge of the Pink Panther (1978)
- Trail of the Pink Panther (1982)
