= Revenge of the Pink Panther =

1978 comedy film directed by Blake Edwards

- Theatrical release poster
- Directed by: Blake Edwards
- Screenplay by: Frank Waldman; Ron Clark; Blake Edwards
- Story by: Blake Edwards
- Produced by: Blake Edwards; Animation: David H. DePatie; Friz Freleng
- Starring: Peter Sellers; Herbert Lom; Robert Webber; Dyan Cannon
- Cinematography: Ernest Day
- Edited by: Alan Jones
- Music by: Henry Mancini; Leslie Bricusse (songwriter)
- Production companies: United Artists Corporation; Jewel Productions; Sellers-Edwards Productions; Animation: DePatie-Freleng
- Distributed by: United Artists
- Release dates: July 13, 1978 (London premiere); July 14, 1978 (London); July 20, 1978 (United States)
- Running time: 98 minutes
- Countries: United Kingdom; United States
- Language: English
- Budget: $12 million
- Box office: $49.5 million (US)

Revenge of the Pink Panther is a 1978 comedy film directed by Blake Edwards who wrote the screenplay with Frank Waldman and Ron Clark. The sixth film in The Pink Panther film series, it features the final new appearance of Peter Sellers in the role of Inspector Jacques Clouseau prior to his death in 1980; the next installment; Trail of the Pink Panther (1982), largely consisted of deleted scenes and outtakes of Sellers from previous films. It was also the last installment in the Pink Panther series that was distributed solely by United Artists; the company was absorbed by Metro-Goldwyn-Mayer in 1981, three years after the film's release.

== Plot ==
Philippe Douvier, a major French businessman and secretly the head of the French Connection, is suspected by his New York Mafia associates of weak leadership and improperly conducting his criminal affairs. To demonstrate otherwise, Douvier's aide Guy Algo suggests a show of strength by assassinating the famous Jacques Clouseau, Chief Inspector of the Sûreté.

Douvier's initial attempt at killing Clouseau with a bomb fails, and the subsequent attempt by Chinese martial artist 'Mr. Chong' is thwarted when Clouseau manages to fight him off, mistaking Chong for Clouseau's manservant Cato, who has orders to keep his employer constantly on the alert with random attacks. Douvier tries again by telephoning Clouseau in an attempt to lure him into an ambush, but transvestite criminal Claude Russo steals Clouseau's car and clothes and is mistakenly shot and killed instead by Douvier's men.

Clouseau's death is erroneously reported by the media, prompting his former boss, former Chief Inspector Charles Dreyfus, to instantly regain his sanity and be released from the psychiatric hospital to conduct the investigation. (Note: Although the multiple attempts by Dreyfus to have Clouseau assassinated in the previous film The Pink Panther Strikes Again are mentioned, exactly how Dreyfus managed to return for this film after committing myriad serious crimes, including the disintegration of the UN Building, as well as his own disintegration by Professor Fassbender's doomsday weapon is never explained.) Dressed in Russo's women's clothing and protesting his true identity, Clouseau is himself taken to the psychiatric hospital where Dreyfus is packing to leave. Clouseau escapes into Dreyfus' room and hides in the closet. Dreyfus opens the closet door and faints at the shock of seeing Clouseau, apparently alive. Clouseau leaves the hospital by posing as Dreyfus and is driven to his apartment by the oblivious François.

Upon arriving home, Clouseau discovers that Cato, who also believed Clouseau to be dead, has transformed their apartment into a Chinese-themed brothel. Cato is relieved to see that his boss has survived, and the two plot revenge on the sponsor of Clouseau's assassination. Later, Dreyfus is aghast when forced to read the eulogy at Clouseau's funeral, during which efforts at suppressing his hysterical laughter at the words praising Clouseau's brilliance cause everyone to believe Dreyfus is devastated by Clouseau's death. Clouseau attends the burial disguised as a priest, and surreptitiously reveals himself to Dreyfus, who again faints and falls into the open grave.

Douvier's wife threatens him with divorce over his infidelity. Because his wife holds evidence of his criminal activities, Douvier breaks off his affair with his secretary Simone, who reacts angrily. Fearing Simone will also expose him, Douvier orders Algo to have her killed while at a nightclub. Acting on a tip-off, Clouseau inadvertently saves her. Clouseau reveals his identity to Simone, and she reveals it was Douvier who ordered Clouseau's assassination. Fleeing Douvier's henchmen, Simone tells Clouseau of Douvier's plan to meet the New York Mafia godfather Julio Scallini in Hong Kong for the Gannet Transaction - the sale of $50,000,000 in heroin hidden in the keel of Douvier's yacht.

Clouseau, Cato, and Simone travel to Hong Kong in disguise, unaware that Dreyfus is following them after overhearing their conversation. Clouseau impersonates Scallini, wearing a ridiculous stereotypical gangster disguise, while Simone distracts the real godfather. Al Marchione, one of Scallini's men, spots Douvier leaving the hotel with the disguised Clouseau and informs Scallini. Clouseau, through his ineptitude, soon exposes himself during the Gannet Transaction. A frenzied chase ensues with Clouseau and Cato pursued by the gangsters, Simone, Dreyfus and the Hong Kong Police. All run into a darkened warehouse where Dreyfus accidentally ignites the fireworks stored inside, catching everyone in the resulting chaos. Douvier and Scallini are arrested, Clouseau is honored for their capture by the President of France, and he and Simone go on a date together.

== Cast ==
- Peter Sellers as Chief Inspector Jacques Clouseau
- Dyan Cannon as Simone Legree
- Robert Webber as Philippe Douvier
- Herbert Lom as Chief Inspector Charles Dreyfus
- Burt Kwouk as Cato Fong
- André Maranne as François
- Tony Beckley as Guy Algo
- Robert Loggia as Al Marchione
- Paul Stewart as Julio Scallini
- Graham Stark as Prof. Auguste Balls
- Alfie Bass as Fernet
- Douglas Wilmer as Police commissioner
- Sue Lloyd as Claude Russo
- Ferdy Mayne as Dr. Paul Laprone
- Valerie Leon as Tanya
- Ed Parker as Mr. Chong (uncredited)
- Adrienne Corri as Therese Douvier
- Henry McGee as Officer Bardot
- Andrew Sachs as "Hercule Poirot"
- Julian Orchard as Hospital clerk
- John Bluthal as Guard at cemetery
- Frank Williams as Gentleman client
- Rita Webb as Woman at window
- Ragbir Sraan as Arab sheikh
- Lon Satton as Nightclub Singer

== Production ==
When United Artists spent three months on previews and continuous editing of the previous Pink Panther movie The Pink Panther Strikes Again (according to Daily Variety in 1976), Edwards decided he would try to salvage any humorous material remaining. He suggested that Revenge of the Pink Panther should primarily be made up of this footage and that he would write and shoot new footage around it with Sellers and company. Sellers balked at this and insisted that Revenge feature all-new footage. The film would have a budget of $12 million, which would primarily be financed by advances from distributors and merchandise licensing.

The opening animated titles in the film were designed by DePatie-Freleng Enterprises, who had been involved with the series since the animated titles of the original 1963 film, The Pink Panther. It was the first time since Inspector Clouseau in 1968 that DePatie-Freleng animated the opening titles of a Pink Panther film (Return and Strikes Again having been done by Richard Williams' Studio).

Principal photography began on November 2, 1977, in Paris and concluded on April 16, 1978, in Nice (the opening scene of Douvier's meeting at his farm with Al Marchione was actually the last scene filmed). Filming also took place at Shepperton Studios and British Hong Kong. Some of the Hong Kong scenes were filmed at The Excelsior hotel. This is Graham Stark's first appearance as Professor Auguste Balls. He portrays him once more in Son of the Pink Panther (1993). Harvey Korman portrays Professor Balls in footage cut from The Pink Panther Strikes Again, but later used in Trail of the Pink Panther (1982).

== Release ==
The film received press screenings at the Kuilima Hyatt Resort in Oahu, Hawaii. The film had its world premiere at the Odeon Leicester Square in London on July 13, 1978 in a premiere attended by Prince Charles. It opened to the public the following day. It opened in the United States at the Ziegfeld Theatre in New York City and at the Cinerama Dome in Los Angeles on July 19, 1978 before expanding to 387 theatres across the United States.

=== Critical reception ===
On review aggregator Rotten Tomatoes, the film has an approval rating of 84% based on 19 reviews, with an average score of 6.70/10. Variety wrote, "Revenge of the Pink Panther isn't the best of the continuing film series, but Blake Edwards and Peter Sellers on a slow day are still well ahead of most other comedic filmmakers." Vincent Canby wrote in The New York Times "If you have the Clouzot [sic] habit, as I have, there's very little that Mr. Edwards and Mr. Sellers could do that would make you find the movie disappointing." One DVD & video guide gave the movie four and a half out of five stars, calling it "arguably the best of the slapstick series." In 1979, the film won the Evening Standard British Film Award for best comedy.

=== Box office ===
The film grossed $62,810 in its first three days at the Odeon Leicester Square. On its US release, it grossed $5,278,784 in its first 5 days of release from 387 theatres and $11,004,124 in its first 12 days from 461 theatres in the United States and Canada.

== Cancelled sequel ==
Romance of the Pink Panther was a Pink Panther film that Sellers had written—and was willing to make without Edwards—before Sellers' death in July 1980. UA considered recasting the role before convincing Blake Edwards to return to the series. Edwards chose to replace Clouseau with a new character rather than replace Sellers as Clouseau and to utilize outtakes from The Pink Panther Strikes Again to set up a transitional film (Trail of the Pink Panther) with new linking footage shot on the set of the new film (Curse of the Pink Panther).

== Soundtrack ==
Composed by Henry Mancini in his fifth Pink Panther film, its theme music and much of the soundtrack draw heavily from the disco trends of the late 1970s. The "Pink Panther Theme" itself was reworked to include a more dancy bassline, electric piano and guitar solo. A soundtrack album for the film was released by United Artists Records.
