= A Ghost of a Chance (1967 film) =

1967 British film by Jan Darnley-Smith

- Directed by: Jan Darnley-Smith
- Screenplay by: Patricia Latham
- Produced by: George H. Brown
- Starring: Jimmy Edwards; Patricia Hayes; Graham Stark; Terry Scott; Ronnie Barker; Bernard Cribbins
- Production company: Fanfare Films
- Release date: 1967
- Running time: 50 minutes
- Country: United Kingdom
- Language: English

A Ghost of a Chance is a 1967 British children's film directed by Jan Darnley-Smith and starring Jimmy Edwards, Patricia Hayes, Graham Stark, Terry Scott and Bernard Cribbins. It was written by Patricia Latham based on a story by Ed Harper, and produced for the Children's Film Foundation.

== Plot ==
Jane, John and Mike want to start a youth club in the old ramshackle Hermitage House. However, the mayor's assistant, in cahoots with a crooked builder, want to demolish the house and sell its contents for scrap. With the help of elderly eccentric Miss Woollie and the two friendly ghosts that live in the house, the children succeed in saving it from demolition.

== Cast ==
=== The children ===
- Stephen Brown as Mike
- Mark Ward as John
- Cheryl Vidgen as Jane

=== The adults ===
- Jimmy Edwards as Sir Jocelyn Hermitage
- Patricia Hayes as Miss Woollie
- Graham Stark as Thomas Dogood
- Terry Scott as Mr. Perry
- Ronnie Barker as Mr. Prendergast
- Bernard Cribbins as Ron
- John Bluthal as Mayor's assistant
- Bob Grant as Town Hall clerk (uncredited)

== Reception ==
Kine Weekly wrote: "A jolly bit of magical fun, this should amuse youngsters of most ages. ... With a cast that any feature comedy would be proud to boast, this delightful little fantasy has been made in the best tradition of knockabout farce and a most entertaining variety of physical indignities has been dreamt up for the talented team of 'villains,' headed by Ronnie Barker, Terry Scott and Bernard Cribbins. The benevolent ghosts are played with gusto by Jimmy Edwards and Graham Stark."

Variety wrote that the film had: "a stellar cast that would do credit to any topline feature film."

Vic Pratt wrote for the British Film Institute: "In CFF films – eerily like real life nowadays – switched-on kids have to battle to sort out society’s problems, because most adults are too corrupt, or just too plain dumb, to do the right thing for themselves. In this slightly subversive spectral stonker, clued-up youngsters enlist the aid of friendly ghosts at their local haunted mansion to see off money-mad property developers. Eccentric activist Miss Woollie (Patricia Hayes) is on hand to help out too, while bumbling corporate stooges Ron and Perry (Bernard Cribbins and Terry Scott) fall foul of possessed digger machines."

Critic Derek Winnert wrote: "A Ghost of a Chance is a mild but amusing spiritual farce aimed at a young audience ... Exceptionally nice adults Jimmy Edwards, Bernard Cribbins, Patricia Hayes, Graham Stark, Terry Scott, and Ronnie Barker shine in spirited performances, the main reason to watch the film."

== Home media ==
A Ghost of a Chance is included on the DVD Children’s Film Foundation Bumper Box Vol 2 (2020).
