= Curse of the Pink Panther =

1983 comedy film by Blake Edwards

- Theatrical release poster by John Alvin
- Directed by: Blake Edwards
- Written by: Blake Edwards; Geoffrey Edwards
- Produced by: Blake Edwards; Tony Adams
- Starring: David Niven; Robert Wagner; Herbert Lom; Joanna Lumley; Capucine; Robert Loggia; Harvey Korman; Burt Kwouk; Ted Wass
- Cinematography: Dick Bush
- Edited by: Robert Hathaway; Ralph E. Winters
- Music by: Henry Mancini
- Production companies: United Artists; Blake Edwards Entertainment; Titan Productions
- Distributed by: MGM/UA Entertainment Company (United States); United International Pictures (International)
- Release dates: 12 August 1983 (United States); 17 February 1984 (United Kingdom)
- Running time: 110 minutes
- Countries: United Kingdom; United States
- Language: English
- Budget: $11,000,000 (estimated)
- Box office: $4,491,986

Curse of the Pink Panther is a 1983 comedy film and a continuation of The Pink Panther series of films created by Blake Edwards in the early 1960s. The film was one of two produced concurrently following the death of the series' star Peter Sellers. Whereas the previous film Trail of the Pink Panther made use of unused footage of Sellers as Inspector Clouseau and starred Joanna Lumley as journalist Marie Jouvet, Curse attempted to relaunch the series with a new lead, Ted Wass, as inept American detective Clifton Sleigh, assigned to find the missing Inspector Clouseau.

The film features a cameo by Roger Moore—as Clouseau himself—at the end of the film. This was David Niven's final film appearance after having died two weeks prior to its release. The film marked Herbert Lom's sixth outing as Chief Inspector Charles Dreyfus. Lom would reprise the role for the last time in Son of the Pink Panther (1993). Capucine made her second and final appearance as Lady Simone Lytton; she originally played Simone Clouseau, Jacques Clouseau's wife in the first film. Curse also featured the sixth Panther appearances of Clouseau's manservant Cato (Burt Kwouk) and Sgt. François Chevalier (André Maranne). Cato, Dreyfus, and François all debuted in A Shot in the Dark (1964). This is the last The Pink Panther film to feature the character Inspector Jacques Clouseau in the original film series.

The film did poorly, receiving many negative reviews.

== Plot ==
In Lugash, the fabled Pink Panther diamond is stolen. A mysterious woman looking to procure the priceless gem has a tête-à-tête with a man regarding price. Clouseau, who had disappeared inexplicably on a plane flight, (Note: As depicted in Trail of the Pink Panther.) bursts in. The woman shoots the man, then points the gun at Clouseau. His fate is a mystery. Meanwhile, his former superior, Chief Inspector Charles Dreyfus, is pressured to oversee Operation Paragon and utilize Interpol's fictitious Huxley 600 computer Aldous to find the world's greatest detective to solve the crime.

Anxious never to see or hear from his nemesis Clouseau again, Dreyfus sabotages the computer to select the world's worst detective. This turns out to be Sergeant Clifton Sleigh, an incompetent officer of the New York Police Department.

Sleigh sees the case as an opportunity to prove his worth. Dreyfus and his long-suffering assistant, Sergeant François Duval, soon find that the sabotage has worked a bit too well: while slightly more intelligent and capable, Sleigh is just as clumsy as Clouseau.

As he sets out on the case, Sergeant Sleigh encounters many people who prefer Clouseau not return: these include the Inspector's former manservant, Cato, who attacks Sleigh when he breaks into the Clouseau Museum Cato now operates; Dreyfus, who attempts to kill Sleigh numerous times like he tried to kill Clouseau; and Bruno Langlois, the mafia boss from the previous film. Ultimately, Langlois, along with his henchmen (including Mr. Chong from Revenge of the Pink Panther) have a final showdown with Sleigh in a dark alley in Valencia, Spain, during Carnival. Juleta Shayne, an employee of the enigmatic Countess Chandra, comes to Sleigh's rescue.

Eventually, Sleigh's trail leads to a health spa run by Countess Chandra. There he meets famous British film star Roger Moore. Seeing a photograph of the Inspector, Countess Chandra tells Sleigh that Clouseau visited her several months ago but claimed his name was Gino Rossi (a thief who had previously stolen the diamond in the last film and was seen fencing it to Countess Chandra at the start of this film when the real Inspector arrived on the scene).

This leads Sleigh to conclude (albeit, incorrectly) that Clouseau stole the Pink Panther, had his face changed and then took the name Gino Rossi; and that he was a good cop gone bad who was killed for the diamond. Francois adds that the man killed had been idenitified as a John Doe, and suggests having the body exhumed to be sure it really is Clouseau. However, anxious to be rid of Sleigh, Dreyfus declines, claiming to have identified the dead man via fingerprints and officially closes the case, though it is clear that Dreyfus does not believe that this is what happened. Dreyfus attempts to destroy any last reminders of Clouseau by burning the documents containing Sleigh's findings. Dreyfus heaves a sigh of relief, believing that he is finally free of Clouseau; however, Clouseau still gets the last laugh as Dreyfus's office catches on fire.

Out at sea in a boat it is revealed that Sir Charles Litton had stolen The Pink Panther diamond from Chandra and Roger Moore (who is heavily implied earlier to not actually be the real Roger Moore, but a very much-alive Clouseau, having indeed changed his face and identity for reasons unknown), claiming he was missing his phantom glove, while he, his wife Simone, and their nephew George share a toast.

In a pre-credits scene, the animated Pink Panther is shown stealing the Pink Panther jewel. Realizing it's heavy, he slips out of the shot and drops the diamond offscreen, shattering it.

== Cast ==
- Ted Wass as Sgt. Clifton Sleigh
- Herbert Lom as Chief Inspector Charles Dreyfus
- David Niven as Sir Charles Litton
- Robert Wagner as George Litton
- Capucine as Lady Simone Litton
- Robert Loggia as Bruno Langlois
- Joanna Lumley as Countess Chandra
- André Maranne as Sgt. François Chevalier
- Burt Kwouk as Cato Fong
- Harvey Korman as Prof. Auguste Balls
- Leslie Ash as Juleta Shane
- Ed Parker as Mr. Chong
- Bill Nighy as ENT Doctor
- Roger Moore (billed as Turk Thrust II) as Inspector Jacques Clouseau
- Liz Smith as Martha
- Michael Elphick as Valencia Police Chief
- Hugh Fraser as Dr Stang
- Joe Morton as Charlie
- Denise Crosby as Denise, Bruno's moll
- Peter Arne as General Bufoni

== Production ==
Curse of the Pink Panther was the second Panther film not to feature Peter Sellers as Inspector Clouseau (the first being Inspector Clouseau starring Alan Arkin). Although director Blake Edwards was able to reassemble one final performance using archival footage in the previous film Trail of the Pink Panther, he refused to recast Sellers and decided to use Curse of the Pink Panther to retire the characters of Dreyfus, Cato, Francois, and Professor August Balls.

Edwards planned to introduce the New York City Police Department detective Sgt. Clifton Sleigh as the new protagonist of the series, told the Los Angeles Times that the series would change geographically. Edwards's first choice for the role was Dudley Moore, who had been in negotiations to play Inspector Clouseau in the previous film. However, he turned it down after the success of Arthur (1981). After considering Rowan Atkinson and John Ritter for the role, Edwards cast Ted Wass after enjoying his performance in Soap. NYPD Lt. Palmyra would have continued as Sleigh's Dreyfus-type boss character and Charlie (the hip black cop) would have been a role similar to Francois. The series would probably have resembled the Police Academy movies more than the classic Pink Panther films. MGM wanted to continue with a cheaper version of the series; Edwards wanted the series to continue as comedy's answer to James Bond. Edwards would not have directed the later Wass films (Terry Marcel was slated to helm the next one) and Edwards' son Geoffrey and Sam Bernard would have scripted. Edwards' co-producer Tony Adams planned to produce one Panther film every three years in order to finance smaller projects, depending on how the movie would perform. After the critical and financial failure of this film, all of these plans were abandoned. Atkinson stated years later he loved Sellers' work and the Panther films, but was sure no one could replace Sellers.

The two films were subsequent written and produced back-to-back on a $17 million budget. Principal photography on the two films began on 15 February 1982 at Pinewood Studios, and concluded on 2 June 1982 in Brooklyn Heights, New York. Filming for Curse of the Pink Panther primarily took place in Nice, Valencia, and Ibiza. Since President Ronald Reagan's daughter Patti Davis was cast in the film, the production in Valencia was guarded by the United States Secret Service and the Spanish National Police Corps. David Niven, Capucine, and Robert Wagner's scenes were filmed at Victorine Studios in Nice. They had been the stars of the original Pink Panther film. This was Niven's final film, and due to his failing health, his voice was dubbed by impressionist Rich Little during post-production. Roger Moore's scenes were filmed during a break from shooting Octopussy. He was credited as "Turk Thrust II", a nod to actor Bryan Forbes, who was credited as "Turk Thrust" in the 1964 Clouseau film, A Shot in the Dark. Clouseau turning to a life of crime and living together with a criminal countess was an element borrowed from Peter Sellers' unfilmed Romance of the Pink Panther script which had, in the second of the script's two drafts, Clouseau leaving the force and joining his new wife, the archcriminal "The Frog", in a life of crime.

In Trail of the Pink Panther, Joanna Lumley had been a TV investigative reporter. Here she is cast as the aristocratic owner of a health spa, Countess Chandra. In her autobiography, Lumley discusses how the scene with Moore and Wass in her chalet was shot in one take with no rehearsals. This was because MGM was at war with Edwards over the budget and shooting schedule and the scene had to be shot last as Moore was then shooting Octopussy concurrently. "Sellers and I usually thoroughly rehearsed set pieces (although not quite as much by Revenge, I have to admit) and shot them numerous times," as evidenced in the alternate takes as seen in Strikes Again/Trail and so forth. "We didn't have that here. Curse suffered from this tremendously--particularly with the key wrap-up scenes."

A new arrangement for "The Pink Panther Theme" (similar to the theme from Revenge of the Pink Panther) with heavy synthesizers is present, to align the theme with '80s music trends. The cartoon opening and closing credits for the film were animated by Marvel Productions. The original tagline on posters was 'He's been bombed, blasted and plugged in the parachute... Is this any way to welcome the World's Greatest Detective?'.

== Soundtrack ==
The film's score was composed by Henry Mancini. No soundtrack album was officially released at the time of the film's premiere in 1983.

In 2010, Quartet Records released the world premiere soundtrack edition on a limited-edition CD containing 23 tracks and five additional bonus tracks. This release was fully restored, reconstructed, and mastered by producer Chris Malone from the original MGM vault elements and Mancini's handwritten cue sheets. The same restored material was later reissued by Quartet Records in 2021 as part of The Pink Panther: The Final Chapters Collection.

== Reception ==
Curse of the Pink Panther received unanimously negative critical reviews and was a box office bomb – with the general consensus being that attempting to continue The Pink Panther series without Sellers was a mistake, though some critics and fans thought that one positive aspect of the film was Moore's cameo, which is a humorous departure from his usual role of the suave and sophisticated hero, complete with falls, minced words and an ice bucket for most of his scenes that showed a previously unknown talent for physical and verbal comedy.

Both this film and Trail came in $1 million over budget. The problem was that the films started shooting in February and were rushed through post-production by October 1982. Trail was a disappointment at the box office. As a result, Metro-Goldwyn-Mayer did not release Curse in the spring of 1983 as planned, instead it was pushed back until August with virtually no newspaper or television promotion for the film. This violated Edwards' contract with MGM; he sued the studio for $180 million in September 1983 for "willfully sabotaging the film". MGM sued Edwards for alleged fraudulent overspending. Shortly after this, Edwards sued MGM for defamation of character. The lawsuits combined totaled over $1 billion. After much legal wrangling, Edwards and MGM settled the various lawsuits out of court in 1988.

Wass' option for several sequels was never taken up, though Edwards did start planning what would become Son of the Pink Panther around the time of the settlement – but MGM was not interested. They went ahead with a television movie in 1989, The New Pink Panther. Gary Nelson directed Charlie Schlatter as a nice-guy television reporter investigating an arsonist, and who teams up with the cartoon Panther (who talks) to solve crimes. This Roger Rabbit knock-off never aired. Finally, after much effort, Edwards's Son was released in 1993, starring Roberto Benigni as Clouseau's illegitimate son. However, like this and Trail, it did not do well at the box-office, signalling the end of Edwards' involvement with the franchise for good.

On review aggregator Rotten Tomatoes, the film has an approval rating of 29% based on 14 reviews, with an average score of 4.00/10. On Metacritic, the film has a weighted average score of 31 out of 100 based on 8 critics, indicating "generally unfavorable" reviews.

MGM produced a commercially successful revival, The Pink Panther (2006), starring Steve Martin as Clouseau, though this film is a reboot of the franchise rather than a continuation. Martin once again played Clouseau in The Pink Panther 2, though that film was not as successful as the first.
