= The Return of the Pink Panther =

1975 detective comedy film by Blake Edwards

- Theatrical release poster by Richard Williams
- Directed by: Blake Edwards
- Written by: Blake Edwards; Frank Waldman
- Produced by: Blake Edwards; Animation: Richard Williams; Ken Harris
- Starring: Peter Sellers; Christopher Plummer; Catherine Schell; Herbert Lom; Burt Kwouk; Peter Arne
- Cinematography: Geoffrey Unsworth
- Edited by: Tom Priestly
- Music by: Henry Mancini
- Production companies: ITC Entertainment; Jewel Productions; Pimlico Films; Mirisch-Geoffrey; Animation: Richard Williams Studio
- Distributed by: United Artists
- Release dates: 21 May 1975 (United States); 1 January 1976 (United Kingdom)
- Running time: 113 minutes
- Countries: United Kingdom; United States
- Language: English
- Budget: $5 million
- Box office: $75 million

The Return of the Pink Panther is a 1975 comedy film and the fourth film in The Pink Panther series. The film stars Peter Sellers returning to the role of Inspector Clouseau for the first time since A Shot in the Dark (1964), after having declined to reprise the role in Inspector Clouseau (1968).

Herbert Lom reprises his role as Chief Inspector Charles Dreyfus from A Shot in the Dark. Also reprising their roles from the previous film are André Maranne as François and Burt Kwouk as Cato; the three thereafter became regulars in the series. The character of Sir Charles Litton is played by Christopher Plummer. David Niven, who played the part in The Pink Panther (1963), was unavailable. The stolen Pink Panther diamond once again plays a central role in the plot.

The film was released on 21 May 1975 in the US and was released on 1 February 1976 in England. The film received positive reviews from critics and was a commercial hit earning $75 million worldwide on a $5 million budget and revived the previously dormant series and with it Peter Sellers' career.

== Plot ==
In the fictional country of Lugash, a mysterious thief seizes the Pink Panther diamond and leaves a white glove embroidered with a gold "P." With its national treasure once again missing, the Shah of Lugash requests the assistance of Inspector Clouseau of the Sûreté, as Clouseau had recovered the diamond the last time it was stolen. (Note: As depicted in The Pink Panther.) Clouseau has been temporarily demoted to beat cop by his boss, Chief Inspector Charles Dreyfus, who despises him to the point of obsession, but the French government forces Dreyfus to reinstate him. Clouseau joyously receives the news and duly departs for Lugash, but not before fending off a surprise attack from his servant Cato, who had been ordered to do so to keep the Inspector on his toes.

Upon examining the crime scene in the national museum — in which, due to his habitual clumsiness, he wrecks several priceless antiques — Clouseau concludes that the glove implicates Sir Charles Litton, alias "the notorious Phantom," as the thief. After several catastrophic failures to stake out Litton Manor in Nice, Clouseau believes a mysterious assassin is attempting to kill him. He follows Sir Charles' wife, Lady Claudine Litton, to the Gstaad Palace hotel in Switzerland in search of clues to her husband's whereabouts and repeatedly bungles the investigation.

Meanwhile, Sir Charles is teased about the theft by his wife and realizes he has been framed. Arriving in Lugash to clear his name, Sir Charles barely avoids being murdered and sent to the Lugash secret police by his associate known as the "Fat Man", who explains that with the leading suspect dead, the secret police will no longer have an excuse to continue purging their political enemies. Escaping to his suite, Litton finds secret police Colonel Sharki waiting for him, who implies the Fat Man's understanding is correct, but reminds him the diamond must be recovered eventually. Sir Charles pretends to cooperate, but is unable to hide his reaction when he recognizes a face on the museum's security footage. He avoids another plot by the Fat Man and his duplicitous underling Pepi and escapes from Lugash, secretly pursued by Sharki, who believes Sir Charles will lead him to the diamond.

In Gstaad, Clouseau, still tailing Lady Claudine, is suddenly ordered by Dreyfus over the telephone to arrest her in her hotel room. However, when Clouseau calls back to clarify the order, he is told that Dreyfus is on vacation. Sir Charles, who in the meantime has chartered a private flight out of Lugash, arrives at the hotel and is first to confront his wife. Lady Claudine admits she stole the jewel to spark excitement in their lives. Colonel Sharki shows up, but just as he prepares to kill them both, Inspector Clouseau barges in. Sir Charles explains things to Clouseau, and Sharki is about to kill the three of them. However, Dreyfus has followed Clouseau and is outside the hotel room with a rifle — Dreyfus is in fact the "mysterious assassin" who has been trying to kill Clouseau all this time — and just as Dreyfus shoots at Clouseau, the Inspector ducks to check if his fly is undone, and the shot kills Sharki instead. The other three take cover, while Dreyfus, insanely enraged by his latest failure to kill Clouseau, goes berserk until he is arrested.

For once again recovering the Pink Panther, Clouseau is promoted to Chief Inspector, while Sir Charles resumes his career as a jewel thief. At a Japanese restaurant in the epilogue, Cato unexpectedly attacks Clouseau again and triggers a massive brawl, destroying the premises; Clouseau chastises Cato for his ill timing but then attempts to attack the latter from behind, only to fail and crash into the kitchen causing more damage. Dreyfus is committed to a lunatic asylum for his actions, where he is straitjacketed inside a padded cell and vows revenge on Clouseau. The film ends when the Pink Panther (in cartoon form) enters Dreyfus' cell and, after watching the credits roll by, films him writing "The End" on the wall with his foot.

== Cast ==
- Peter Sellers as Inspector Jacques Clouseau
- Christopher Plummer as Sir Charles Litton
- Catherine Schell as Lady Claudine Litton
- Herbert Lom as Chief Inspector Charles Dreyfus
- Peter Arne as Colonel Sharki
- Peter Jeffrey as General Wadafi
- Grégoire Aslan as Chief of Lugash Police
- Burt Kwouk as Cato Fong
- David Lodge as Mac
- Graham Stark as Pepi
- Eric Pohlmann as fat man
- Victor Spinetti as hotel concierge
- André Maranne as Sgt. François Chevalier
- Mike Grady as bell boy
- John Bluthal as blind beggar
- Peter Jones as psychiatrist
- Nadim Sawalha as museum guide
- Yashar Adem as museum guard
- Claire Davenport as masseuse
- Lew Grade as the Shah of Lugash (in the portrait behind General Wadafi's desk; uncredited)

== Production ==
In the early 1970s, Blake Edwards wrote a 15–20 page outline for another Pink Panther film and presented it to series producer Walter Mirisch. The producer loved the idea, but the franchise's distributor and main backer, United Artists, rejected the film as they had no interest in working with Edwards nor Peter Sellers, whose careers had declined.

British producer Lew Grade agreed to finance two films for Blake Edwards as part of a deal to get Edwards' wife, Julie Andrews, to appear in a TV special for him. The first movie was The Tamarind Seed. Edwards wanted to make a project set in Canada called Rachel and the Stranger, but Grade disliked the idea and offered to buy Edwards out of the second commitment. Edwards wanted to make a second movie, however, in order to help restore his tainted reputation in Hollywood. Grade said he then suggested making a new Pink Panther film and Edwards agreed, if Sellers would also agree to do it. Grade managed to talk Sellers into it and the project was on.

UA agreed to give The Return of the Pink Panther to Grade in exchange for world distribution and a share of the profits; thereafter, Grade's company would permanently own worldwide rights to the film. Grade said that Eric Pleskow of United Artists was offered the chance to come into the movie as a partner but declined, thinking the movie would be a financial failure; he only wanted UA to distribute. Grade gave the film a $2 million budget, although it eventually grew to $5 million.

Principal photography took place in the summer of 1974 in Gstaad, Switzerland; Nice, France; Marrakesh and Casablanca, Morocco; and Munich, West Germany. Edwards was dissatisfied with some of the footage and conducted reshoots on a London soundstage in September 1974.

Richard Williams, later the animation director on Who Framed Roger Rabbit, did the animated open and closing titles for this picture and The Pink Panther Strikes Again, as DePatie–Freleng was then unavailable due to its workload producing the Pink Panther shorts and other televised and theatrical animated projects. Williams got help animating this from two noted animators, Ken Harris and Art Babbitt. Carol Cleveland, best known for her regular appearances on Monty Python's Flying Circus, appears in one scene, diving into a swimming pool. A soundtrack album, featuring Henry Mancini's score for the film, was released by RCA Records. A novelization, written by the film's co-writer, Frank Waldman, was belatedly published by Ballantine Books in March 1977 (ISBN 0345251237). In British cinemas the film was preceded by the short film Where The Americas Meet.

== Reception ==
=== Critical reception ===
In The New York Times, Vincent Canby gave the film a positive review, writing, "Clouseau is the very special slapstick triumph of Mr. Sellers and Mr. Edwards." Variety called it "another very funny film about the eternal gumshoe bungler, Inspector Clouseau. 'The Return of the Pink Panther' is in many ways a time capsule film, full of brilliant sight gags and comedic innocence." Gene Siskel of the Chicago Tribune gave the film 2 stars out of 4, finding Sellers' first scene funny but for the rest of the movie, "we not only know when each and every joke is coming; we know exactly what that joke will be." Charles Champlin of the Los Angeles Times wrote that the film was "I think, not up to what went before. Its calculations show and the inspector is somehow too entirely the buffoon, lacking a redeeming pathos I seem to remember from the earlier outings. But in its vigorous and bulls-eye way 'The Return of the Pink Panther' is a cheerful escape from all the things that ail us." Gary Arnold of The Washington Post called it "a frequently hilarious and generally satisfying return to comic form on the part of Peter Sellers, recreating the role of the hapless but dogged French sleuth." Penelope Gilliatt of The New Yorker wrote that Sellers was "working here at his best." The film holds a score of 79% on Rotten Tomatoes based on 24 reviews.

=== Box office ===
The film grossed $41.8 million in the United States and Canada and $75 million worldwide.

=== Home media ===
The film had been released on VHS, Betamax, CED and LaserDisc in the 1980s by Magnetic Video (under license from ITC Entertainment), 20th Century-Fox Video (under license from ITC Entertainment), CBS/Fox Video (under license from MGM/UA Home Entertainment Group, Inc. and ITC Entertainment), and J2 Communications (under license from ITC Home Video) respectively. In 1993 and 1996, LIVE Home Video under the Family Home Entertainment label re-released the film on VHS as part of the Family Home Entertainment Theatre lineup and on a Widescreen LaserDisc. In 1999, Artisan Entertainment (LIVE's successor) re-released the film on VHS and debuting on DVD for the first time in the original widescreen format. The only bonus material seen on this release were cast filmographies, production notes and the film's original theatrical trailer.

In 2006, rights holder Granada plc (owners of the ITC catalog) sub licensed the film to Universal Studios Home Entertainment under Focus Features for distribution in the US and UK, with a new, bare-bones release featuring an anamorphic widescreen transfer being released in 2006 by Universal in both territories. In 2015, the 2006 UK DVD was reissued by Fabulous Films still under licence from Universal and ITV Studios (who acquired Granada and the ITC library), followed by a UK Blu-ray release by Fabulous in 2016.

As Metro-Goldwyn-Mayer has since acquired US theatrical rights, along with worldwide television and digital distribution rights, Universal/Focus and ITV still have all remaining worldwide rights for the film. Due to its licensing output deals with both MGM and Universal, Shout! Factory included this film, along with the other Peter Sellers Pink Panther films, as part of a 6-disc set for the first time on Blu-ray under their Shout! Select label. The set was released on June 27, 2017, thus making it the first Pink Panther film collection to include the film. Ironically, Universal was also responsible for MGM/UAR film releases both in physical home media from 2019 to 2026 and international theatrical distribution rights from 2019 to 2022.
