= Inspector Clouseau =

Fictional character created by Blake Edwards

- The Pink Panther and The Inspector character
- Peter Sellers as Inspector Clouseau, sporting his Herbert Johnson trilby
- First appearance: The Pink Panther
- Created by: Maurice Richlin; Blake Edwards
- Portrayed by: Peter Sellers (1963–1982); Alan Arkin (1968); Daniel Peacock (1982, teenager); Roger Moore (1983); Steve Martin (2006–2009)

In-universe information
- Nationality: French

Inspector Jacques Clouseau (French: [ʒɑk kluzo]), later granted the rank of Chief Inspector, is a fictional character in Blake Edwards' farcical The Pink Panther series. Clouseau's immense ego, eccentricity, exaggerated French accent, and prominent mustache are all a parody of Hercule Poirot, the fictional Belgian detective created by Agatha Christie. He is portrayed by Peter Sellers in the original series, and also by Alan Arkin in the 1968 film Inspector Clouseau and, in a cameo, by Roger Moore (credited as Turk Thrust II) in the 1983 film Curse of the Pink Panther. In the 2006 reboot and its 2009 sequel, Clouseau is portrayed by Steve Martin. Clouseau's likeness also appears in the Pink Panther animated cartoon shorts and segments, where he is known as simply "the Inspector".

== Character ==
=== Overview ===
Clouseau is an inept and incompetent police detective in the French Sûreté, whose investigations quickly turn to chaos. His absent-mindedness and extreme clumsiness almost always lead to destruction of property: while interviewing witnesses in The Pink Panther Strikes Again, he falls down a set of stairs, gets his hand caught in a medieval knight's gauntlet, then in a vase; knocks a witness senseless and voiceless, destroys a priceless piano, and accidentally causes a Scotland Yard superintendent to be shot in the buttocks, all within nearly five minutes. Despite his lack of judgment and skill, Clouseau always manages to solve his cases and finds the correct culprits, almost entirely by accident.

Clouseau is promoted to Chief Inspector over the course of the series, and is regarded in other countries as France's greatest detective, until they encounter him directly. His incompetence, combined with his luck and his occasionally correct interpretations of the situation, frustrate his direct superior, former Chief Inspector Charles Dreyfus so intensely, Dreyfus is eventually driven to insanity.

While Clouseau is generally oblivious to his own ineptitude and genuinely believes he possesses superior expertise and intelligence, he occasionally appears to recognize his limitations. As a police detective, Clouseau also insists upon wearing ridiculously elaborate disguises and aliases that range from the mundane (a telephone company repairman) to the ludicrously preposterous (a buck-toothed hunchback with an oversized nose); but even in these absurd disguises he cannot hide his characteristic inanity.

Clouseau is a patriotic Frenchman; later films reveal he had fought in the French Resistance during the Second World War. He is repeatedly perplexed by transvestites, to the extent that he addresses them as "Sir or Madam". He has been prone to infatuation (often reciprocated) ever since the first film, in which his antagonist cuckolds him.

Clouseau's faux French accent became much more exaggerated in the later films (for example, pronouncing "room" as "reum"; "Pope" as "Peup"; "bomb" as "beumb"; and "bumps" as "beumps"), and a frequent running gag in the movies was that even French characters had difficulty understanding what he was saying. In his earliest appearances, Clouseau appears slightly less inept than in the later films; but even in his first appearance he believes himself a skilled violinist, but plays out of tune, and often appears clumsy at moments of highest seriousness. Sellers maintained that Clouseau's oversized ego made his klutziness even funnier, particularly in his regular attempts to remain dignified, elegant, and refined while causing comic chaos.

=== Films ===
==== The Pink Panther (1963) ====
Jacques Clouseau makes his first appearance as the Inspector in the 1963 film The Pink Panther, which was released in the United States in March 1964. The movie is centered on David Niven's role as Sir Charles Lytton, the infamous jewel thief nicknamed "the Phantom", and his plan to steal the Pink Panther diamond from a vacationing princess. The Clouseau character was a supporting, comedic role as Lytton's incompetent and oblivious antagonist. Clouseau's wife Simone (Capucine), is secretly Sir Charles's lover and accomplice, and departs with him at the end of the film after they have framed Clouseau for the theft of the Pink Panther.

==== A Shot in the Dark (1964) ====
A Shot in the Dark (1964) was based upon a stage play that originally did not include the Clouseau character. In this film, Sellers began to develop the exaggerated French accent that later became a hallmark of the character. The film also introduces two of the series' regular characters: his superior, Commissioner Dreyfus (Herbert Lom), who is driven mad by Clouseau's blundering in the investigation; and his long-suffering Chinese manservant, Cato (Burt Kwouk), who is expected to improve Clouseau's martial arts skills by attacking him at random.

==== Inspector Clouseau (1968) ====
In Inspector Clouseau, the character was portrayed by American actor Alan Arkin; Blake Edwards was not involved in this production. The film's opening credits, animated by TVC London for DePatie-Freleng Enterprises, feature their Inspector character from the series of cartoon shorts under that title. Sellers declined to appear as Clouseau in Inspector Clouseau (1968) but he returned for The Return of the Pink Panther (1975) and its sequels.

==== The Return of the Pink Panther (1975) ====
The 1968 film does appear to have influenced the Clouseau character when Sellers returned to the role in The Return of the Pink Panther (1975), particularly in the character's mode of dress. According to DVD liner notes for The Return of the Pink Panther, Sellers and Edwards originally planned to produce a British television series centered on Clouseau, but this film was made instead. The opening credits were animated by Richard Williams. The plot centers on Clouseau once again seeking to retrieve the stolen Pink Panther diamond. David Niven was unavailable to reprise the role of Sir Charles Lytton, so Christopher Plummer was cast. Catherine Schell appears as Lady Lytton. The film was a financial success and led to Edwards quickly developing a sequel.

==== The Pink Panther Strikes Again (1976) ====
The Pink Panther Strikes Again continues the story from the end of The Return of the Pink Panther, featuring the now-insane Dreyfus creating a crime syndicate and constructing a doomsday weapon with the intention of using it to blackmail world leaders to assassinate Clouseau. Like the previous film, it was a box office success. Unused footage from this film was used to include Sellers in Trail of the Pink Panther. The opening credits were again animated by Richard Williams.

==== Revenge of the Pink Panther (1978) ====
After the success of The Pink Panther Strikes Again, Edwards and Sellers reunited for their final film, Revenge of the Pink Panther which has Clouseau investigating a plot to kill him by a prominent businessman who is head of the French Connection. The movie was another box office success and led to several more sequels after Sellers death in July, 1980. Biographies of Sellers such as Peter Sellers—A Celebration reveal that he was involved in the pre-production of another Clouseau film, Romance of the Pink Panther, at the time of his death.

==== Trail of The Pink Panther (1982) ====
Blake Edwards attempted to continue telling Clouseau's story despite the death of his lead actor. The 1982 film Trail of the Pink Panther utilized outtakes and alternative footage of Sellers as Clouseau in a new storyline in which a reporter (played by Joanna Lumley) investigates Clouseau's disappearance. In the process, she interviews characters from past Clouseau films (including the Lyttons, played by the returning David Niven and Capucine), and also meets Clouseau's equally inept father (played by Richard Mulligan).

==== Curse of the Pink Panther (1983) ====
The immediate sequel to Trail, Curse of the Pink Panther, reveals that Clouseau underwent plastic surgery to change his appearance; the character appears on screen briefly in the form of a joke cameo appearance by Roger Moore, billed as "Turk Thrust II". David Niven and Capucine again reprise their original Pink Panther roles as the Lyttons, now also joined by the returning Robert Wagner as nephew George Lytton. Neither Trail nor Curse were box office moneymakers, and the series was retired for about a decade due to a lengthy period of litigation between Edwards and MGM over the film's release date.

==== Son of the Pink Panther (1993) ====
Despite the failure of Curse, Edwards attempted to revive the series a decade later with Son of the Pink Panther, in which it is revealed that Clouseau had illegitimate children by Maria Gambrelli (played by Elke Sommer in A Shot in the Dark, although recast in this film as Claudia Cardinale, who played the Princess in The Pink Panther). Clouseau's son, Jacques Jr., was portrayed by Roberto Benigni, and has a twin sister, Jacqueline, played by Nicoletta Braschi. Jacques Jr. attempts to follow in his father's police footsteps, but is revealed to have inherited his ineptitude. Herbert Lom and Burt Kwouk made their final appearances as Dreyfus and Cato in this film.

==== The Pink Panther (2006) ====
Steve Martin as Clouseau, suited with a Gendarme uniform

Steve Martin's portrayal of Clouseau in the reboot 2006 film has Clouseau as a bumbling Gendarme hired by Chief Inspector Dreyfus to serve as the visible face of a high-profile murder investigation, so that Dreyfus can carry out his own investigation without risking repercussions of failure; but Martin's Clouseau is considerably older than Sellers'. Although foolish, Martin's Clouseau is generally more intelligent and competent than Sellers' version, as he is able to locate the Pink Panther diamond and solve the case by knowledge, and observation, of obscure data. A running gag in this and the following film has Clouseau randomly attacking his partner, Gilbert Ponton, only to be countered each time. This is a mirror image of the running gag in the original films wherein Clouseau's original sidekick, Cato Fong, attacked Clouseau in order to keep Clouseau's skills sharp.

==== The Pink Panther 2 (2009) ====
When a series of rare and historical artifacts are stolen by the mysterious jewel thief The Tornado, Clouseau is assigned to a "dream team" of international investigators to recover the artifacts and the Pink Panther. Despite appearing to be bumbling and clumsy as usual, Clouseau once again displays surprising cleverness through his unorthodox methods. For example, he replaces the Pink Panther with a near perfect fake, reasoning that if The Tornado were the culprit, he would have been able to tell that the Pink Panther was a fake. He also causes several problems for Dreyfus, as usual. The film culminates in his marriage to Nicole Durant, Dreyfus's secretary.

== Portrayers in film ==
=== Peter Sellers ===
- The Pink Panther (1963)
- A Shot in the Dark (1964)
- The Return of the Pink Panther (1975) – The fourth film chronologically.
- The Pink Panther Strikes Again (1976)
- Revenge of the Pink Panther (1978)
- Trail of the Pink Panther (1982) – Released posthumously, utilized unused footage from previous films.
- Son of the Pink Panther (1993) – In photographs, the ninth film chronologically, centered on Clouseau's son.

=== Alan Arkin ===
- Inspector Clouseau (1968) – The third film chronologically.

=== Roger Moore ===
- Curse of the Pink Panther (1983) – Cameo appearance, the eighth film chronologically.

=== Steve Martin ===
- The Pink Panther (2006) – Reboot, the tenth film chronologically.
- The Pink Panther 2 (2009)

=== Other films ===
- 3 Dev Adam (1973) – Unauthorized cameo appearance in the film, film features other unauthorized characters, his character was killed by Spider-Man, both Spider-Man and Captain America completely mistook him as being a henchman of the mafia, portrayed by an uncredited Turkish actor.
- Romance of the Pink Panther (1980) – Only two script drafts, scrapped after Sellers's death, likely would have been the seventh film chronologically.

== Future ==
On July 28, 2025, Eddie Murphy confirmed reports that he would play Clouseau to be true.

== See also ==
- The Inspector
- Hercule Poirot
- French National Police
- French Resistance
- Sûreté
