= A Shot in the Dark (1964 film) =

1964 film by Blake Edwards

- Theatrical release poster
- Directed by: Blake Edwards
- Screenplay by: Blake Edwards; William Peter Blatty
- Based on: L'Idiote 1960 play by Marcel Achard; A Shot in the Dark 1961 play by Harry Kurnitz
- Produced by: Blake Edwards
- Starring: Peter Sellers; Elke Sommer; George Sanders; Herbert Lom
- Cinematography: Christopher Challis
- Edited by: Bert Bates; Ralph E. Winters
- Music by: Henry Mancini
- Production companies: The Mirisch Corporation; Mirisch Films; Animation: DePatie-Freleng; TVC London
- Distributed by: United Artists
- Release dates: June 23, 1964 (U.S.); January 28, 1965 (UK)
- Running time: 102 minutes
- Countries: United Kingdom; United States
- Language: English
- Box office: $12.3 million (U.S.)

A Shot in the Dark is a 1964 comedy film directed by Blake Edwards, who co-wrote the screenplay with William Peter Blatty. Filmed in Panavision, it is a standalone sequel to The Pink Panther (1963) and is the second installment in the eponymous film series. Peter Sellers reprised his role as Inspector Jacques Clouseau of the French Sûreté, with Elke Sommer, Herbert Lom and George Sanders co-starring in supporting roles.

Clouseau's blundering personality is unchanged, but it was in this film that Sellers began to give him the idiosyncratically exaggerated French accent that was to later become a hallmark of the character. The film also marks the first appearances of Clouseau's long-suffering boss Commissioner Dreyfus (Lom), as well as André Maranne as Dreyfus's assistant François and Burt Kwouk as Clouseau's stalwart manservant Cato, all three of whom would become series regulars. Sommer portrays the murder suspect, Maria Gambrelli. The character of Gambrelli would return in Son of the Pink Panther (1993), this time played by Claudia Cardinale, who appeared as Princess Dala in The Pink Panther (1963). Graham Stark, who portrays police officer Hercule Lajoy, would reprise this role eighteen years later, in Trail of the Pink Panther (1982).

The film was not originally written to include Clouseau, but was an adaptation of a stage play by Harry Kurnitz, which he adapted from a French play L'Idiote by Marcel Achard. The film was released only a year after the first Clouseau film, The Pink Panther.

== Plot ==
Late at night at the country home of millionaire Benjamin Ballon, several of its occupants are moving about rooms, hiding and spying on others. The household consists of: Ballon's wife Dominique; Henri LaFarge, the head butler, and his wife Madame LaFarge, the cook; Miguel Ostos, the head chauffeur; Pierre, the second chauffeur, and his wife Dudu, the head maid; Georges the gardener, and his wife Simone, the second maid; Maria Gambrelli, the third maid; and Maurice, the second butler. The night's events soon end with gunshots in the room of Maria, with Miguel found murdered.

Inspector Clouseau of the Sûreté, a blundering and inept detective, arrives on the scene, accompanied by his assistant, Hercule Lajoy. Suspicion is cast upon Maria, as she was found by Maurice clutching the gun that killed the victim. Before Clouseau can investigate further, his superior Commissioner Dreyfus removes him from the investigation out of fear he will bungle a high-profile case.

The following day, while training with his manservant Cato under a strict unplanned arrangement between them, Clouseau is reinstated to head the investigation after Dreyfus is ordered by his superiors to do so, through Ballon's political influence. In discussion with his assistant, Hercule, about the murder, Clouseau asserts that Maria is innocent despite the evidence against her, but believes she is protecting the real killer who he suspects might be Ballon himself. To keep her under surveillance during the investigation he arranges for her release from prison. However, two more murders occur—Georges in the Ballons' greenhouse; and Dudu at a nudist camp—with the evidence pointing towards Maria in each case. Despite the facts, Clouseau continues to believe she is innocent, which leaves Dreyfus dismayed at his incompetence in the case and the scandals he causes. After the body of Henri is found in the closet of Maria's bedroom, Clouseau is again removed from the case.

Although Dreyfus begins to suspect Ballon is attempting to hide facts about the murders, assuming that he is shielding someone with Maria's help, Clouseau's theory about her innocence leaves Dreyfus worried that he could be undone. When Dreyfus is again forced to put Clouseau back on the case, he eventually suffers a nervous breakdown upon hearing of Clouseau going out for the evening with Maria. That night, Clouseau takes Maria to several clubs, and, as they drink and have fun, they start becoming closer. At the same time, several attempts are made on Clouseau's life by a stalker at various establishments, but all of these attempts fail—without Clouseau or Maria noticing—and result in the deaths of several innocent bystanders. When they return to Clouseau's apartment, Maria kisses him and asks him to take her to his bed, and they are about to make love when they are interrupted by Cato who jumps on the bed for a new surprise attack on Clouseau. Then a time bomb hidden in a package explodes and badly damages Clouseau's apartment, without however harming the three people inside. The increased notoriety of the case as a result of the incidents, coupled with proving Clouseau's theory correct, slowly cause Dreyfus to become unhinged.

Clouseau finally decides to confront the entire Ballon household over the murders, hoping to trick the murderer into revealing himself. However, his plan unexpectedly proves Maria innocent in all four murders. Dominique reveals she killed Miguel by mistake, believing he was her husband who she thought was having an affair with Maria; Madame LaFarge murdered Georges, with whom she was having an affair, because he was about to leave her for Dominique; Simone killed Dudu in order to maintain her affair with Pierre; and Ballon murdered Henri because he was having an affair with Dominique. Pierre also reveals that Maurice was blackmailing Ballon. Meanwhile, Dreyfus is revealed to be the stalker targeting Clouseau previously. Dreyfus plants a bomb in Clouseau's car in one more attempt to kill him. Clouseau's plan comes to its climax when Hercule cuts the house lights in the midst of the chaos. The Ballons, Madame LaFarge, Pierre, Simone and Maurice flee and attempt to escape in Clouseau's car, unaware of the bomb, and the car explodes as they drive off. Believing everyone was innocent, despite what they had confessed to, Dreyfus loses his sanity and is dragged away by Hercule. Clouseau, embracing Maria, finally declares her innocent, but a passionate kiss between them is swiftly interrupted when Cato makes a sneak attack.

== Cast ==
- Peter Sellers as Inspector Jacques Clouseau
- Elke Sommer as Maria Gambrelli
- George Sanders as Monsieur Benjamin Ballon
- Herbert Lom as Commissioner Charles Dreyfus
- Tracy Reed as Dominique Ballon
- Graham Stark as Hercule Lajoy
- Moira Redmond as Simone
- Vanda Godsell as Madame LaFarge
- Maurice Kaufmann as Pierre
- Ann Lynn as Dudu
- David Lodge as Georges
- André Maranne as Sgt. François Chevalier
- Martin Benson as Maurice
- Burt Kwouk as Cato (Note: Credited as Kato)
- Reginald Beckwith as receptionist
- Douglas Wilmer as Henri LaFarge
- Bryan Forbes (Note: Credited as Turk Thrust) as Turk, the nudist camp attendant
- André Charrise (Note: Credited as André Charise) as game warden
- Howard Greene as gendarme
- John Herrington as the doctor
- Jack Melford as the psycho-analyst
- Victor Baring as taxi driver
- Victor Beaumont as gendarme
- Tutte Lemkow as Cossack dancer (Note: Misspelled in credits as "Kazak dancer")
- Hurtado De Cordoba Ballet as flamenco dancers & guitarist
- Fred Hugh as balding customer
- Rose Hill as soprano
- Tahitian Dance Group as themselves

== Production ==
Sellers was attached to star in the film adaptation of Harry Kurnitz's Broadway hit before the release and success of The Pink Panther, but was not pleased with the script by Alec Coppel and Norman Krasna. Walter Mirisch approached Blake Edwards and asked him to take over as director of A Shot in the Dark from Anatole Litvak. Edwards initially declined but eventually relented under pressure, on the condition he could rewrite the script, substitute Inspector Clouseau for the lead character, and choreograph comic scenes on the fly as he and Sellers had successfully done for their previous film.

Edwards' rewritten script bore little resemblance to Kurnitz's play, and in response, Sellers's co-star Walter Matthau quit the film. Sophia Loren also had to quit several days before production began to recover from throat surgery. After Shirley MacLaine turned down the role, Romy Schneider was cast; however, she also had to quit due to her commitments with Good Neighbor Sam (1964) and was replaced with Elke Sommer. Sommer used part of her salary to "buy her way out" of a film deal in West Germany and sign a new contract with Metro-Goldwyn-Mayer.

Principal photography began on November 18, 1963, at MGM-British Studios in Borehamwood, England. Shooting also took place in Paris and London. The relationship between Edwards and Sellers deteriorated to such a point that at the conclusion of the film they vowed never to work together again. They eventually reconciled to collaborate successfully four years later on The Party, and on three more "Pink Panther" films in the 1970s.

Taking inspiration from his teacher Ed Parker in martial arts, Edwards created the new character Cato Fong using the American Kenpo style. Parker briefly worked alongside Edwards learning more about cinematography and suggested that he implement slow motions at certain fight scenes in order to increase the dramatic effect and make the moves more noticeable for audiences. Following a favorable response from viewers, Edwards continued to use this effect in following Pink Panther films.

As with most of the other Clouseau films, A Shot in the Dark features an animated opening titles sequence produced by DePatie-Freleng Enterprises utilizing an animated version of Inspector Clouseau. This film and Inspector Clouseau are the only Clouseau films not to feature the Pink Panther character in the opening titles. Henry Mancini's theme for this film serves as opening theme and incidental music in The Inspector cartoon shorts made by DePatie-Freleng from 1965 to 1969. The title song, "The Shadows of Paris", was written by Henry Mancini. The singer is not credited but contemporary trade reports confirm it was Decca Records recording artist Gina Carroll.

== Reception ==
Bosley Crowther of The New York Times wrote, "It is mad, but the wonderful dexterity and the air of perpetually buttressed dignity with which Mr. Sellers plays his role make what could quickly be monotonous enjoyable to the end." Variety wrote: "Wisdom remains to be seen of projecting a second appearance of the hilariously inept detective so soon after the still-current firstrun showing of 'Panther,' since some of the spontaneous novelty may have worn off, but the laughs are still there abundantly through imaginative bits of business and a few strike belly proportions." Philip K. Scheuer of the Los Angeles Times wrote that the film "is all variations of falling down and going boom ... I won't say 'ad nauseum' [sic] because Sellers is a clever comedian and never that painful to take. But enough is enough already." Richard L. Coe of The Washington Post called it "a hardworking comedy," adding "While the lines are bright and sometimes blue, the real fun comes from sight gags, an old if neglected film ingredient."

The Monthly Film Bulletin wrote, "Where The Pink Panther had style and a certain subtlety, its successor ... can substitute only slapstick of the crudest kind. As the bumbling inspector, Sellers is this time absolutely out of hand, his principal—and endlessly repeated—gag being to fall with a resounding splash into large quantities of water." John McCarten of The New Yorker wrote, "'A Shot in the Dark' as done on Broadway was a mediocre comedy, but Blake Edwards, who directed the film and collaborated on the script with William Peter Blatty, had the good sense to toss the foundation stock out the window and let Mr. Sellers run amok ... All in all, extremely jolly." The movie was one of the 13 most popular films in the UK in 1965.

The film was well received by critics. It has 94% favourable reviews on review aggregator Rotten Tomatoes out of 32 reviews counted. The average rating given by critics is 8.1 out of 10. The critical consensus reads: "A Shot in the Dark is often regarded as the best of the Pink Panther sequels, and Peter Sellers gives a top-notch performance that makes slapstick buffoonery memorable." In 2006, the film was voted the 38th-greatest comedy film of all time in Channel 4's 50 Greatest Comedy Films. The film is recognized by the American Film Institute in these lists:

- 2000: AFI's 100 Years...100 Laughs – No. 48

== Trivia ==
It is unexplained why Pierre tries to run away at the end of the movie with the four murderers and Maurice the blackmailer. Pierre hadn't been accused of any crime. Even more mysteriously, Clouseau later asserts that the explosion of the car killed "five murderers and a blackmailer" which is clearly inexact since there had been only four murders at the Ballon household, and Pierre hadn't killed anyone.

== See also ==
- List of American films of 1964
