= Inspector Clouseau (film) =

1968 detective comedy film by Bud Yorkin

- Theatrical release poster by Jack Davis
- Directed by: Bud Yorkin
- Screenplay by: Frank Waldman; Tom Waldman
- Based on: Inspector Clouseau by Blake Edwards; Maurice Richlin
- Produced by: Lewis J. Rachmil
- Starring: Alan Arkin; Frank Finlay; Barry Foster; Patrick Cargill; Beryl Reid; Clive Francis; Delia Boccardo
- Cinematography: Arthur Ibbetson
- Edited by: John Victor-Smith
- Music by: Ken Thorne
- Production companies: The Mirisch Corporation; Animation: DePatie–Freleng; TVC London
- Distributed by: United Artists
- Release dates: 14 February 1968 (United Kingdom); 28 May 1968 (Los Angeles); 19 July 1968 (United States)
- Running time: 96 minutes
- Countries: United Kingdom; United States
- Language: English
- Box office: US$1.9 million

Inspector Clouseau is a 1968 comedy film, and the third installment in The Pink Panther film series. It was directed by Bud Yorkin, written by brothers Frank Waldman and Tom Waldman and stars Alan Arkin as the titular character. It was filmed by Mirisch Films at the MGM-British Studios, Borehamwood and in Europe.

Unlike the previous instalments in the film series, Blake Edwards was not the director, Henry Mancini did not write the film's score, nor did Peter Sellers portray the titular role. All three were involved at that time with the film The Party. Nonetheless, when Sellers and Edwards declined to participate, The Mirisch Company decided to proceed without them. The film languished in obscurity and although it has been released to home video on VHS, DVD and Blu-ray, it was not included in 2004's Pink Panther Collection but was later added to the Ultimate collection released in 2008.

The film received mostly negative reviews and performed poorly at the box office.

== Plot ==
In London, Sir Charles Braithwaite, Commissioner for Scotland Yard, struggles to solve an organized crime case involving a gang which has been performing robberies across Europe. Britain's Prime Minister decides to request outside help to solve the case, which the press view as an insult. French Inspector Jacques Clouseau is the one sent to assist. Sir Charles briefs Clouseau on the case. Three suspects were in custody, but two, Frenchie LeBec and Steven Frey escaped. The only suspect still in custody is Addison Steele.

Sir Charles warns Clouseau not to trust anyone, even those in the Yard, as he is suspicious that there is a mole among their ranks. Meanwhile, Steele works as the prison's barber. When Clouseau arrives, Steele is cutting the hair of the warden's son, Clyde Hargreaves. Once Clyde is finished, Steele tells Clouseau that he does not know who the leader of the gang is, but only knows him by the name of "Johnny Rainbow." Clouseau is then tricked into a shave by Steele. During the hot towel treatment, Steele uses chloroform to subdue Clouseau and escape custody.

At Scotland Yard, Superintendent Weaver gives Clouseau experimental disguised weapons to help with his investigation. Frenchie later attempts to assassinate Clouseau, who accidentally kills him with one of Weaver's weapons. Sir Charles is annoyed that Clouseau killed Frenchie, as they were unable to interrogate him. After realizing his own food has been poisoned, Clouseau finds a matchbook from a nearby inn called Tudor Arms on Frenchie's body. At the inn, Clouseau searches for more leads and is seduced by two women that subdue and kidnap him. They pour rubber on Clouseau's face, which they use to make a mold of his likeness.

Clouseau accidentally kills the owner of the inn by crushing him with a bed and realizes that he has a Johnny Rainbow tattoo. Clouseau goes to Frenchie's funeral in France to look for more leads and is attacked by the gang. Weaver's maid, Lisa Morell, arrives and rescues him. She is actually an agent for Interpol who has been sent to help him. Clouseau does not believe Lisa's story and arrests her. However, his superior, Préfet de Police Geffrion, confirms she is telling the truth.

At the gang's hideout, Johnny Rainbow is revealed to be Clyde Hargreaves. He has used the rubber mold to create several masks that resemble Clouseau's face. Rainbow's plan is for the gang to rob thirteen Swiss banks simultaneously, while Clouseau takes the fall for the crime. Clouseau learns of the plan and goes to the hideout to investigate. Two of Rainbow's men, Bomber LeBec and Stockton follow Clouseau and attempt to kidnap him, but Weaver arrives and foils this. Weaver, who is actually the mole, slips a train ticket from Le Havre, France to Zurich, Switzerland in Clouseau’s pocket and walks away.

On the train, Weaver attempts to kill Clouseau and later poses as him in Zurich. Lisa warns him about Weaver, not realizing she is really speaking to Weaver in disguise. Lisa is kidnapped by the gang, and Rainbow puts on the disguise as Clouseau. Weaver and Rainbow feed the Swiss authorities false information about the robberies and order the bank presidents to put all their funds into the waiting armored cars outside for "safekeeping." The money is then switched into fake Lindt & Sprüngli vans. They take the money to one of Lindt’s chocolate factories and package the stolen money like chocolate bars and then put them into a ship on the Limmat River.

The real Clouseau is arrested for the robberies and cannot convince the authorities of the truth. Weaver attempts to escape by disguising himself as Clouseau, but is killed in a fight with the real Clouseau. This proves that Clouseau is innocent. He goes to rescue Lisa, chases after Steele and is eventually captured by Rainbow's men. Clouseau escapes using one of Weaver's weapons and sinks the ship. The heist is foiled, but Rainbow and his men escape. Clouseau returns to France after saying goodbye to a grateful Sir Charles.

== Cast ==
- Alan Arkin as Inspector Jacques Clouseau
- Frank Finlay as Superintendent Weaver
- Patrick Cargill as Commissioner Sir Charles Braithwaite
- Beryl Reid as Mrs. Maya Weaver
- Barry Foster as Addison Steele
- Clive Francis as Clyde Hargreaves / Johnny Rainbow
- Delia Boccardo as Lisa Morell
- Richard Pearson as Shockley
- Michael Ripper as Stevie Frey
- Susan Engel as Carmichael
- Wallas Eaton as Hoeffler
- Tutte Lemkow as "Frenchie" LeBec
- Katya Wyeth as Meg
- Tracey Crisp as Julie
- John Bindon as "Bull" Parker
- Geoffrey Bayldon as Gutch
- Eric Pohlmann as Bergesch
- George Pravda as Wulf
- Anthony Ainley as "Bomber" LeBec

=== Cast notes ===
In addition to the title role, Arkin also played the members of the gang whenever they were disguised as Clouseau, with the other actors' voices dubbed onto the soundtrack.

== Production ==
Although the two previous Pink Panther films (The Pink Panther and A Shot in the Dark), both directed by Blake Edwards and featuring Peter Sellers as Inspector Jacques Clouseau, were successful, Sellers and Edwards clashed during production and vowed never to work together again. Producer Walter Mirisch was interested in making a third Pink Panther film, but Sellers repeatedly refused the role. Following Alan Arkin's success in The Russians Are Coming, the Russians Are Coming, Mirisch cast Arkin in the role of Clouseau. Blake Edwards declined to direct so Mirisch hired Bud Yorkin. Prior to the beginning of production, Sellers contacted Mirisch stating that only he could play Clouseau and would be willing to appear in the film if he was given script approval. Mirisch turned him down.

The film was produced by Lewis J. Rachmil as one of Mirisch Films United Kingdom's film company qualifying for Eady Levy funds. Location scenes for Inspector Clouseau were shot in Europe.

The animated opening credits were created and designed by DePatie–Freleng Enterprises and animated by TVC London, using DePatie–Freleng's character design of The Inspector from the series of cartoon shorts under that title. (DePatie–Freleng also animated the Pink Panther cartoon shorts, as well as the opening credit sequences for most of the Edwards-Sellers Clouseau films).

== Reception ==
The film has an approval rating of 0% on Rotten Tomatoes from five critic reviews. Renata Adler of The New York Times was negative, calling the film "one of those episodic, all-purpose arbitrary comedies in which anything goes—and nothing works." Variety praised the film as "a lively, entertaining and episodic story of bank robbers. Good scripting, better acting and topnotch direction get the most out of the material." Roger Ebert gave the film 2.5 stars out of 4, writing that "Arkin provides some funny scenes," but that they "are the exception and not the rule, however. For most of the time, events move pretty slowly, and the camera lingers on Arkin, waiting for moments of inspiration that never come." Time magazine wrote, "Arkin follows meticulously in his predecessor's flatfootsteps, but the result is only a parody of a parody," adding, "Bud Yorkin's slovenly direction makes the film look as if every expense had been spared, trapping Arkin in a farce of habit that will probably retire Clouseau to oblivion – one picture too late." Kevin Thomas of the Los Angeles Times called it "a dull comedy ... that deflates faster than a leaky balloon. Not that it's the highly gifted Arkin's fault. He tries and tries (and occasionally succeeds) but the uninspired script is hopeless from the start." Leo Sullivan of The Washington Post called it "a mirthless failure." Penelope Gilliatt of The New Yorker called it "an incredibly bad film, but Alan Arkin is sometimes very funny in it, especially when he doesn't try to be." The Monthly Film Bulletin wrote, "Though it moves at a fast enough pace and is more inventively directed than A Shot in the Dark (Bud Yorkin makes good use of his elaborate sets and expensive gadgetry), this third film in the Clouseau series finally demonstrates that the joke has run out of steam. That it works at all is largely due to Alan Arkin's performance as Clouseau, which emerges as a hilarious blend of Keaton and Sellers."
