= That's Life! (film) =

1986 film by Blake Edwards

- Theatrical release poster
- Directed by: Blake Edwards
- Written by: Blake Edwards; Milton Wexler
- Produced by: Tony Adams; Jonathan D. Krane
- Starring: Jack Lemmon; Julie Andrews; Sally Kellerman; Robert Loggia; Jennifer Edwards; Rob Knepper; Matt Lattanzi; Chris Lemmon; Cynthia Sikes; Dana Sparks; Emma Walton; Felicia Farr
- Cinematography: Anthony B. Richmond
- Edited by: Lee Rhoads
- Music by: Henry Mancini
- Production companies: Blake Edwards Entertainment; Delphi V Productions; Paradise Cove Entertainment; Ubilam Productions
- Distributed by: Columbia Pictures
- Release date: October 10, 1986
- Running time: 102 minutes
- Language: English
- Budget: $1–1.5 million
- Box office: $4 million

That's Life! is a 1986 American comedy-drama film directed by Blake Edwards and starring Jack Lemmon and Julie Andrews.

The film was made independently by Edwards using largely his own finances and was distributed by Columbia Pictures.

That's Life! was shot in Edwards and his wife Andrews' own beachside home in Malibu and features their family in small roles, including Edwards' daughter Jennifer Edwards, Andrews' daughter Emma Walton Hamilton and Lemmon's son Chris Lemmon portraying the offspring of Andrews and Lemmon's characters, while the senior Lemmon's wife Felicia Farr portrays the fortune teller Madame Carrie.

Because of the film's independent status, many of the cast and crew were paid below union-level wages, resulting in the American Society of Cinematographers picketing the film during production and taking an advertisement in Variety in protest. As a result, the original director of photography, Harry Stradling Jr., was forced to quit the film and was subsequently replaced by Anthony B. Richmond, a British cinematographer.

== Plot ==
Harvey Fairchild is a wealthy, Malibu-based architect who is turning 60 and suffering from a form of male menopause. He feels aches and pains, real or imaginary, and seems unhappy with his professional and personal life. Harvey's patient wife, famous singer Gillian Fairchild, tries to cheer him with family get-togethers and an elaborately planned birthday party this weekend. But she secretly has worries of her own: a lesion on her throat, possibly cancerous, the biopsy results which she won't get until after the weekend.

Whining his way through day after day, Harvey snaps at his pregnant daughter Megan Fairchild Bartlet and makes rude remarks to his actor son Josh. The miserable Harvey is furious with a client named Janice Kern who can't stop revising her plans for a magnificent house Harvey has been building, but he, wanting to get over his depression, succumbs to her sexual advances, although they don't go through with it solely because he can't get it up. Although a lapsed Catholic, he tries going to confession, only to discover that the priest to whom he is confessing is "Phony" Tony Baragone, his Notre Dame roommate and an old rival. He also consults a local fortune teller, Madame Carrie, sex with whom leaves Harvey with a severe case of crabs (pubic lice).

Gillian bravely hides her cancer fear from the family, but finally, overcome with emotion, she confides in her friend and neighbor Holly Parrish. Harvey threatens to spoil the birthday party for everybody. He is in such a foul mood that just because a friend named Belmont tells him a depressing story about an illness, he amuses himself by introducing Belmont to the crab-infected Madame Carrie, who, by coincidence, Gillian has hired to entertain at the party.

Gillian warns Harvey that he is going to lose everything if he continues to behave this way. During his party, Gillian's doctor Keith Romanis arrives to inform her that the biopsy test results are negative and she is going to be all right. She takes Harvey aside to let him know just how precious life really can be.

== Cast ==
- Jack Lemmon as Harvey Fairchild
- Julie Andrews as Gillian Fairchild
- Sally Kellerman as Holly Parrish
- Robert Loggia as Father Baragone
- Jennifer Edwards as Megan Fairchild Bartlet
- Rob Knepper as Steve Larwin
- Matt Lattanzi as Larry Bartlet
- Chris Lemmon as Josh Fairchild
- Cynthia Sikes as Janice Kern
- Dana Sparks as Fanny Ward
- Emma Walton as Kate Fairchild
- Felicia Farr as Madame Carrie
- Theodore Wilson as Corey
- Jordan Christopher as Dr. Keith Romanis
- Biff Elliot as Belmont

== Reception ==
That's Life! grossed $4 million at the domestic box office. The film was reportedly already in the black from a VHS distribution sale at the time of release.

The film's critical reviews were mixed. On Rotten Tomatoes it has an approval rating of 56% based on reviews from 16 critics, with an average rating of 6/10.

== Accolades ==
| Award | Category | Nominee(s) | Result | Ref. |
|---|---|---|---|---|
| Golden Globe Awards | Best Actor in a Motion Picture – Musical or Comedy | Jack Lemmon | Nominated | |
| Golden Globe Awards | Best Actress in a Motion Picture – Musical or Comedy | Julie Andrews | Nominated | |
| Golden Globe Awards | Best Original Song – Motion Picture | "Life in a Looking Glass"; Music by Henry Mancini; Lyrics by Leslie Bricusse | Nominated | |
| Golden Raspberry Awards | Worst Original Song | "Life in a Looking Glass"; Music by Henry Mancini; Lyrics by Leslie Bricusse | Nominated | |
| Academy Awards | Best Original Song | "Life in a Looking Glass"; Music by Henry Mancini; Lyrics by Leslie Bricusse | Nominated | |
