= Justin Case (film) =

1988 film by Blake Edwards

- Genre: Comedy; Mystery
- Screenplay by: Blake Edwards
- Story by: Blake Edwards; Jennifer Edwards
- Directed by: Blake Edwards
- Starring: George Carlin
- Music by: Henry Mancini
- Country of origin: United States
- Original language: English

Production
- Producer: Tony Adams
- Running time: 71 minutes
- Production company: Walt Disney Television

Original release
- Network: ABC
- Release: May 15, 1988

Justin Case is a 1988 television film by Blake Edwards. George Carlin stars as a murdered private investigator named Justin Case who comes back as a ghost.

From an idea by Edwards' daughter, actress Jennifer Edwards, the film was intended as a pilot for a proposed TV series, however, plans for a series were later abandoned. The film was produced by the Blake Edwards Company in association with Walt Disney Television, and aired on ABC as a presentation of The Disney Sunday Movie on May 15, 1988.

== Plot ==
Justin Case is found dead in his office by Jennifer Spalding, an out-of-work dancer who's there to interview for a secretary/receptionist position. Justin returns a ghost that only Jennifer can see, and convinces her to help unravel the mystery of his murder.

== Cast ==
- George Carlin as Justin Case
- Molly Hagan as Jennifer Spalding
- Timothy Stack as Officer Swan
- Kevin McClarnon as Officer Rush
- Douglas Sills as David Porter
- Gordon Jump as Sheldon Wannamaker
- Paul Sand as Cab Driver
- Valerie Wildman as Woman in Black
- Todd Susman as Aaron Slinker
- Rod McCary as Simon Fresca
- Philippe Denham as Paul Arkin
- Richard McGonagle as Dr. Richard Wwintraub
- Jay Thomas as Delivery Man
- Kenneth Tigar as Motel Manager
- Kay Perry as Lucille Marposian
