= Richard Mulligan =

American actor (1932–2000)

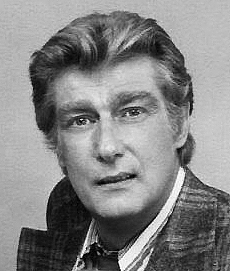
- Mulligan in 1977
- Born: November 13, 1932; The Bronx, New York, U.S.
- Died: September 26, 2000 (aged 67); Los Angeles, California, U.S.
- Occupation: Actor
- Years active: 1962–2000
- Spouses: Patricia Jones (m. 1955; div. 1960) Joan Hackett (m. 1966; div. 1973) Lenore Stevens (m. 1978; div. 1990) Rachel Ryan (m. 1992; div. 1993)
- Relatives: Robert Mulligan (brother)

Richard Mulligan (November 13, 1932 – September 26, 2000) was an American character actor. He was known for his roles in the sitcoms Soap (1977–1981) and Empty Nest (1988–1995). Mulligan was the winner of two Emmy Awards (1980 and 1989) and one Golden Globe Award (1989). He was the younger brother of film director Robert Mulligan.

== Early life and career ==
Mulligan was born on November 13, 1932, in New York City. He served in the Navy in the early 1950s during the Korean War and later studied to become a playwright at Columbia University. After college, he began working in theatre, making his debut as a stage manager and performer on Broadway in All the Way Home in 1960. Additional theatre credits included A Thousand Clowns, Never Too Late, Hogan's Goat, and Thieves.

Mulligan made a brief, uncredited appearance in the 1963 film Love with the Proper Stranger, which was directed by his elder brother. He starred with Mariette Hartley in the 1966–67 season comedy series The Hero, in which he played TV star Sam Garrett. Garrett had starred in a fictional series as Jed Clayton, U.S. Marshal. The Hero lasted for 16 episodes. Another notable TV appearance was on the I Dream of Jeannie episode "Around the World in 80 Blinks", as a navy commander accompanying Major Nelson (Larry Hagman) on a mission. He also appeared in the season-13 episode "Wonder" of the Western TV show Gunsmoke. He also was in an episode of The Rat Patrol, 1967.

== 1970s to end of career ==
Mulligan's most notable film role was as General George Armstrong Custer in Little Big Man, whom he portrayed as a borderline psychotic. He also appeared in a disaster movie spoof, The Big Bus (1976), where he was reunited with Larry Hagman from I Dream of Jeannie, and in the 1966 film The Group, in which he played Dick Brown, Harold's (Hagman) New York artist friend. In 1975, he starred in a radio adaptation of Edgar Allan Poe's "The Oblong Box" heard on the CBS Radio Mystery Theater.

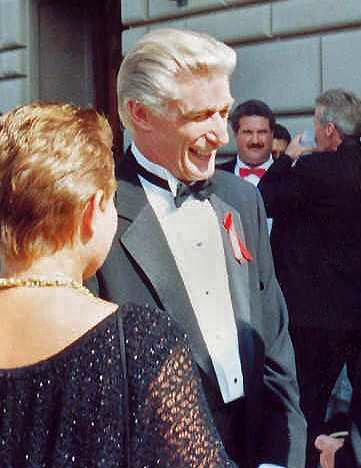
Mulligan at the 1991 Emmy Awards

Mulligan's best-known roles in television were as Burt Campbell in the sitcom Soap (1977–81), for which he won a Best Actor Emmy Award, and as Dr. Harry Weston in the NBC series Empty Nest, a spin-off of The Golden Girls in which his character had appeared in a couple of episodes. Empty Nest ran for seven seasons, and Mulligan won a Best Actor Emmy Award as well as a Golden Globe Award for his performance. He also played Secretary of State William Seward in Lincoln (1988), a TV movie based on Gore Vidal's novel.

Mulligan returned to perform on Broadway and in films, in which he usually played supporting roles. A notable exception was the black comedy S.O.B. (1981), in which he played a leading character, Felix Farmer, a Hollywood producer-director based upon the film's actual producer-director, Blake Edwards. The film starred Julie Andrews and William Holden, and also featured Larry Hagman. Mulligan was cast as Reggie Potter in the television series Reggie (1983). Lasting for only six episodes, it was a loose adaptation of the popular BBC series The Fall and Rise of Reginald Perrin. In the 1984 film Teachers, he played an escaped psych patient from a mental institution, who impersonates a substitute teacher (who in one scene teaches the Battle of the Little Bighorn, once more dressed as General Custer).

He guest-appeared in the 1985 The Twilight Zone episode "Night of the Meek", where he took on the role of Henry Corwin, an alcoholic department-store Santa Claus who becomes the genuine article. This was a remake of the 1959 Christmas episode "The Night of the Meek," when Art Carney played the same part. The next year, he appeared in another episode of the series, "The Toys of Caliban".

Mulligan lent his voice to Disney's 1988 animated film, Oliver & Company, as the oafish Great Dane named Einstein. His final performance was a voice-over on Hey Arnold! in 2000 as the voice of Jimmy Kafka, the long-mentioned, but never-seen former friend of Arnold's grandpa.

== Marriages ==
Mulligan married four times. He was first married to Patricia Jones from 1955 to 1960. That was followed by marriages to Joan Hackett from January 3, 1966, to June 1973 and Lenore Stevens from 1978 to 1990. His last marriage was to adult film actress Rachel Ryan on April 27, 1992, which lasted only six months.

== Death ==
On September 26, 2000, Mulligan died of cancer at his home in Los Angeles, aged 67.

== Recognition ==
In 1980, Mulligan went on to win a Primetime Emmy Award for Soap, and in 1989, won both the Emmy and the Golden Globe Award for Best Lead Actor in a Comedy Series for portraying Dr. Harry Weston in Empty Nest (1988–1995). On September 30, 1993, he received a star on the Hollywood Walk of Fame for his work in the television industry, located at 6777 Hollywood Boulevard.

== Filmography ==
=== Film ===
Year	Title	Role	Notes
1962	40 Pounds of Trouble	Bellhop	Uncredited
1963	Love with the Proper Stranger	Louie	Uncredited
1964	One Potato, Two Potato	Joe Cullen	
1966	The Group	Dick Brown	
1969	The Undefeated	Dan Morse	
1970	Little Big Man	George Armstrong Custer	
1971	A Change in the Wind		
1972	Irish Whiskey Rebellion	Paul Lachaise- Alcoholic Actor	
1972	Harvey	Dr. Lyman Sanderson	TV movie
1973	From the Mixed-Up Files of Mrs. Basil E. Frankweiler	Mr. Kincaid	
1974	Visit to a Chief's Son	Robert	
1976	The Big Bus	Claude Crane	
1978	Having Babies III	Jim Wexler	TV movie
1979	Scavenger Hunt	Marvin Dummitz	
1981	S.O.B.	Felix Farmer	
1982	Trail of the Pink Panther	Clouseau's father	
1983	Malibu	Charlie Wigham	TV movie
1984	Jealousy	Merrill Forsyth	TV movie
1984	Meatballs Part II	Coach Giddy	
1984	Teachers	Herbert Gower	
1984	Micki + Maude	Leo Brody	
1985	Doin' Time	Mongo Mitchell	
1985	The Heavenly Kid	Rafferty	
1986	A Fine Mess	Wayne 'Turnip' Parragella	
1986	Babes in Toyland	Barnie / Barnaby Barnicle	TV movie
1988	Lincoln	William H. Seward	TV Mini-Series
1988	Oliver & Company	Einstein	Voice
1996	London Suite	Dennis Cummings	TV movie
1997	Dog's Best Friend	Fred	TV movie

=== Television ===
Year	Title	Role	Notes
1962	The Defenders	Lt. Summers	Episode: "The Empty Chute"
1963	Car 54, Where Are You?	Patrolman	Episode: "The Curse of the Snitkins"
1963	Route 66	County Prosecutor	Episode: "Shadows of an Afternoon"
1966–1967	The Hero	Sam Garret	16 episodes
1967	The Rat Patrol	Major Lansing	Episode: "Take Me to Your Leader Raid"
1967	Mannix	Dr. Bob Adams	Episode: "Beyond the Shadow of a Dream"
1967	Gunsmoke	Jud Pryor	Episode: "Wonder"
1969	I Dream of Jeannie	Commander Wingate	Episode: "Around the World in 80 Blinks"
1970	The Most Deadly Game	Jordan	Episode: "Witches' Sabbath"
1971	Love, American Style	George	Episode: "Love and the Jury"
1971	Police Surgeon	Kramer	Episode: "A Taste of Sun"
1971	Bonanza	Dr. Mark Sloan	Episode: "Don't Cry, My Son"
1971	Bonanza	Farley	Episode: "Kingdom of Fear"
1971	The Partridge Family	Dr. Jim Lucas	Episode: "Why Did the Music Stop?"
1972	Circle of Fear	Tom	Episode: "House of Evil"
1973	Diana	Jeff Harmon	2 episodes
1973	The Partridge Family	Mr. Lipton	Episode: "The Diplomat"
1973	Pueblo (film)	CWO G.H. Lacy	Made for TV movie
1975	Medical Story	Dr. Ted Freeland	Episode: "The Right to Die"
1975	Matt Helm	Jack Harte	Episode: "Dead Men Talk"
1976	Little House on the Prairie	Granville Whipple	Episode: "Soldier's Return"
1976	Switch	Andy Rowen	Episode: "The Argonaut Special"
1976	Charlie's Angels	Kevin St. Clair	Episode: "Night of the Strangler"
1976	Spencer's Pilots	Babcock	Episode: "The Matchbook"
1976	The McLean Stevenson Show	Lloyd	Episode: "Oldie But Goodie"
1976	Gibbsville	Ben	Episode: "Saturday Night"
1977	Hunter	Dr. Harter	Episode: "Mirror Image"
1977	Kingston: Confidential	Harlan Scott	Episode: "Triple Exposure"
1977	Dog and Cat	Brother Saul	Episode: "Brother Death"
1977	The Love Boat	Ron Larsen	Episode: "Ex Plus Y"
1977–1981	Soap	Burt Campbell	82 episodes Primetime Emmy Award for Outstanding Lead Actor in a Comedy Series; Nominated—Primetime Emmy Award for Outstanding Lead Actor in a Comedy Series
1978	The Love Boat	Mark Littlejohn	Episode: "Where Is It Written?"
1979	$weepstake$	Dewey	Episode: "Dewey and Harold and Sarah and Maggie"
1983	Reggie	Reggie Potter	6 episodes
1985–1986	The Twilight Zone	Henry Corwin, Ernie Ross	2 Episodes: "Night of the Meek", "The Toys of Caliban"
1986	Highway to Heaven	Jeb Basinger	Episode: "Basinger's New York"
1988–1995	Empty Nest	Dr. Harry Weston	170 episodes Golden Globe Award for Best Actor – Television Series Musical or Comedy; Primetime Emmy Award for Outstanding Lead Actor in a Comedy Series; Nominated—Golden Globe Award for Best Actor – Television Series Musical or Comedy (1990–91); Nominated—Primetime Emmy Award for Outstanding Lead Actor in a Comedy Series (1990–91); Nominated—Viewers for Quality Television Award for Best Actor in a Quality Comedy Series (1990–91)
1988–1989	The Golden Girls	Dr. Harry Weston	3 episodes
1991–1993	Nurses	Dr. Harry Weston	4 episodes
1995	The John Larroquette Show	Richard Hemingway	Episode: "An Odd Cup of Tea"
1997	The Angry Beavers	Old Gramps	Episode: "Fish and Dips"
2001	Hey Arnold!	Jimmy Kafka	Episode: "Old Iron Man" (final appearance)
