= Sunset (1988 film) =

1988 American film by Blake Edwards

- Theatrical release poster by Drew Struzan
- Directed by: Blake Edwards
- Screenplay by: Blake Edwards
- Based on: Sunset (unpublished manuscript) by Rod Amateau
- Produced by: Tony Adams
- Starring: Bruce Willis; James Garner; Mariel Hemingway; Kathleen Quinlan; Jennifer Edwards; Malcolm McDowell
- Cinematography: Anthony B. Richmond
- Edited by: Robert Pergament
- Music by: Henry Mancini
- Production company: ML Delphi Premier Productions
- Distributed by: Tri-Star Pictures
- Release date: April 29, 1988
- Running time: 107 minutes
- Country: United States
- Language: English
- Budget: $16 million (estimated)
- Box office: $4.6 million

Sunset is a 1988 American mystery western comedy film written and directed by Blake Edwards and starring Bruce Willis as Western actor Tom Mix, who teams up with lawman Wyatt Earp, portrayed for the second time in a theatrical film by James Garner. Based on an unpublished novel by Rod Amateau, the plot has Earp and Mix solve a murder in Hollywood in 1929.

Although Sunset has some comedic elements, it veers much more to the period mystery genre of old Hollywood. Reviewers, such as Roger Ebert, struggled trying to define the film. Ebert noted: "The strangest thing about Sunset is that it's not a comedy, not exactly. It has some laughs, but it's a sort of low-key, elegiac mood film ..."

While Willis received top billing in Sunset, Garner had more screen time in the film. This was the final film in which Garner played Wyatt Earp, the first being John Sturges's Hour of the Gun, released in 1967. This was director Edwards's second and final collaboration with Willis, whom he directed in Blind Date (1987).

== Plot ==
In Hollywood in the late 1920s, during the waning days of the industry's transition to sound film, producer and studio head Alfie Alperin wants to produce an epic Western film about Wyatt Earp. Tom Mix is cast as the great United States Marshal and the real Earp is on the set as a technical adviser.

While Earp and Mix, the "real" and "reel" western heroes, are involved in their film adventure, they also get caught up in an actual case of murder, prostitution and corruption with vicious gangster Dutch Keiffer. Together, they try to straighten out the problems of Michael Alperin, the missing son of Earp's former girlfriend, Christina. She is now the wife of studio boss Alfie Alperin and he is not pleased by Earp's investigation. Hostess Cheryl King becomes romantically involved with Earp.

Alfie's sister, Victoria Alperin, is dating notorious mobster Dutch Kieffer and all three were at the scene of the murder of Madam Candice Gerard. Soon Earp unveils the true sadistic character of Alfie. Two of his accomplices, studio Chief of Studio Police Marvin Dibner, whose interest is in protecting Alperin, and corrupt Captain Blackworth, turn nasty.

Mix and Earp get to fight a real gunfight at a real isolated ranch, with Mix telling Earp "I wish there was a camera here" before drawing a real gun. After the death of Christina, matters become personal for Earp, leading to the explosive climax between Mix, Alperin, and Earp.

== Cast ==
- Bruce Willis as Tom Mix
- James Garner as Wyatt Earp
- Malcolm McDowell as Alfie Alperin
- Mariel Hemingway as Cheryl King
- Kathleen Quinlan as Nancy Shoemaker
- Jennifer Edwards as Victoria Alperin
- Patricia Hodge as Christina Alperin
- Richard Bradford as Captain Blackworth
- M. Emmet Walsh as Chief Dibner
- Joe Dallesandro as "Dutch" Kieffer
- Andreas Katsulas as Arthur
- Dann Florek as Marty Goldberg
- Bill Marcus as Hal Flynn
- Michael C. Gwynne as "Mooch"
- Dermot Mulroney as Michael Alperin
- Miranda Garrison as Spanish Dancer
- Liz Torres as Rosa
- Cástulo Guerra as Pancho
- Dakin Matthews as William Singer
- Vernon Wells as Houseman
- John Dennis Johnston as Ed
- Peter Jason as Frank Coe
- Richard Fancy as Speaker
- Glenn Shadix as Roscoe Arbuckle
- Maureen Teefy as Stagecoach Lady
- Arnold Johnson as George
- Bing Russell as Guard
- Luis Contreras as Inmate
- Charles Noland as Inmate
- Rod McCary as Douglas Fairbanks
- John Fountain as John Gilbert
- Jeris Lee Poindexter as Cleaner
- Grant Heslov as Car Attendant

== Historical context ==
Although largely fictitious, the story does contain elements of historical fact. Sunset depicts Wyatt Earp as a technical advisor to a fictional Tom Mix film of the Gunfight at the O.K. Corral, in which Mix portrays the famous western marshal. Earp had been living in the Los Angeles area since about 1910. He had served as an unpaid technical adviser on some early silent Westerns from 1915 on and knew Western stars William S. Hart and Mix. When he died on January 13, 1929, at the age of 80, Earp's funeral featured both Hart and Mix as pallbearers. (Note: Sunset shows Earp attending the first Academy Awards presentation on May 16, 1929; the actual event occurred months after his death.)

Both Mix's and Earp's personas are part of the plot in Sunset, with each figure alternately exploiting and deflating their public images. While Earp recounts some of his exploits, dropping names like Doc Holliday and Calamity Jane, he remains a taciturn and steadfast former lawman. The gunfight in Tombstone, Arizona had lasted only 30 seconds, but it would end up defining Earp for the rest of his life.

Mix also deals with his personal story, dismissing much of the conjecture about his origins, yet showing some of the bravado and derring-do that characterized his screen career. He compared himself as a "movie star cowboy" to the made-up heroics of Buffalo Bill Cody. His skills as a horseman, however, were faithfully derived from an early life as a cowboy; the impresario personality came later.

The film did contain some historical inaccuracies. The film features Earp (James Garner) attending the 1st Academy Awards, which took place on May 16, 1929. Historically, Wyatt Earp died on January 13, 1929 (at the age of 80). He was ill prior to his death. The film omits any mention of Josephine Marcus, who had been Earp's common law wife for over twenty-five years at the time of his death. In 1929, she lived in Los Angeles with Earp.

== Production ==
Mariel Hemingway, like Bruce Willis and Garner, signed up for the film for the chance to work with Blake Edwards. Hemingway confessed: "The movie sounded a little chaotic, but it had a secret weapon: it was directed by Blake Edwards who had made Breakfast at Tiffany's, a movie that was almost a religion with me. I couldn't pass up the chance to work with him."

Garner had fond memories of working with Edwards in Victor/Victoria (1982), and Willis and Edwards had a close working relationship after Willis had made his film debut in Edwards’s Blind Date. Throughout the pre-production phases of the film, Edwards counseled his young star that, "... he couldn't rely on the jokes and the leer" that had been his trademark in the Moonlighting television series (1985–1989). The relationship between the two male leads was not as sunny, however. After filming, Garner said he would never work with Willis again, saying: "Willis is high school. He's not that serious about his work. He thinks he's so clever he can just walk through it, make up dialogue and stuff. I don't think you work that way."

A running gag throughout the film was that Wyatt Earp cannot drive, though he does so on more than one occasion. Garner was considered an expert stunt driver and did quite a lot of his own driving on his TV series, The Rockford Files (1974–1980). (Note: Garner did his own driving in Grand Prix (1966) and competed in races after-hours; he was considered one of the "best" actor drivers, ranked just behind Steve McQueen and Paul Newman.)

Edwards went to great lengths to re-create the 1920s Hollywood era, including a re-creation of the 1929 Academy Awards dinner, complete with a mime act that closely resembled the antics of silent screen comedians such as Charlie Chaplin. This focus on period detail was noted as one of the serious flaws in the staging of the film.

Principal photography on Sunset took place from April 6, 1987 and wrapped on July 2, 1987. The filming locations included locations in Southern California: Ambassador Hotel, 3400 Wilshire Boulevard, Los Angeles, Hollywood Roosevelt Hotel, 7000 Hollywood Boulevard, Hollywood. For exteriors, the Orange Empire Railroad Museum, Perris, California (railroad scenes), the Bell Ranch, Santa Susana, California and Melody Ranch, 24715 Oak Creek Avenue, Newhall, California were utilized. Studio work took place at Culver City Studios.

== Soundtrack ==
The musical soundtrack for Sunset was scored by Henry Mancini. The film features the song "Black and Tan Fantasy" by Duke Ellington and His Orchestra.

== Reception ==
=== Box office ===
Studio executives were divided on how to promote Sunset, as most filmgoers would have expected a Blake Edwards film to be a comedy. The trailer began with the catchphrase: "The following story is almost true ... give or take a lie or two" and emphasized comedic scenes. Upon release, Sunset was a box office failure, produced on a $16 million budget, and making only $4.6 million domestically.

=== Critical ===
Sunset earned predominately negative reviews from critics and the public alike. Most reviewers noted that Garner's screen presence was the only thing that made the film watchable. Hal Hinson in his review for The Washington Post contrasted the impact of the two male stars: "Ultimately, Sunset plays like deluxe dinner theater fare. It's a diversion to take along with your after-meal coffee and dessert. Garner's western suavity is the only grace note. Few performers have generated the sort of good will that Garner has, and this may be the most solid work he's ever done in the movies. The figure he cuts is an evocative one. Watching him, you may think you smell a trace of sagebrush."

Film critic Robert Horton was scathing in his review of Sunset, calling it "... a moribund movie made by a collection of people who have an abundance of talent. How does a movie like this go wrong?" He laid the blame squarely on Edward's limp direction. "... Edwards seems to have lost his verve. Sunset crawls along with little conviction or life."

Movie historian Leonard Maltin seemed to agree with Horton, calling the picture an "appalling piece of junk, unpleasant and unbelievable from the word go. Willis registers zero playing one of the Western genre's most magnetic stars; only Garner's charisma saves this bomb."

On review aggregator Rotten Tomatoes, the film has an approval rating of 21% based on 14 reviews, with an average score of 3.70/10.

== Awards and nominations ==
Patricia Norris, costume designer for Sunset, was nominated for the Academy Award for Best Costume Design at the 61st Academy Awards in 1989. However, at the 9th Golden Raspberry Awards, Edwards was awarded the dubious distinction of the Golden Raspberry Award for Worst Director, tying with Stewart Raffill for Mac and Me. Hemingway was also nominated for the Golden Raspberry Award for Worst Supporting Actress.
