= Emma Walton Hamilton =

British-American author

- Born: Emma Katherine Walton; 27 November 1962 (age 63); London, England
- Other name: Emma Walton-Hamilton
- Citizenship: United Kingdom; United States
- Education: UCLA Lab School
- Occupations: Author; theatrical director; actress
- Years active: 1983–present
- Spouse: Steve Hamilton (m. 1991)
- Children: 2
- Parents: Tony Walton (father); Julie Andrews (mother)
- Relatives: Jennifer Edwards (step-sister)
- Website: www.emmawaltonhamilton.com

Emma Katherine Walton Hamilton (née Walton; born 27 November 1962) is a British-American author, editor, producer, and actress. She is an instructor in the MFA in Creative Writing program at Stony Brook University, New York State, where she serves as director of the Southampton Children's Literature Conference and the Young Artists and Writers Project (YAWP). She is the daughter of singer and actress Julie Andrews and set and costume designer Tony Walton.

== Early life ==
Walton was born in The London Clinic in central London. Her parents are British actress and singer Dame Julie Andrews and Tony Walton, a British set and costume designer. Her godmothers are actress Carol Burnett and Svetlana Beriosova, prima ballerina of The Royal Ballet. In 1967, her parents divorced, and two years later, her mother married film director Blake Edwards, who became her stepfather. Walton's childhood was spent between London, Los Angeles (where her mother worked), and New York City, where her father lived. She attended UCLA Lab School, according to her mother.

== Career ==
From 1983 to 1991, she acted in theater, film, and television, including Micki + Maude and That's Life!, and a recurring role on "As the World Turns.

In 1991, she, her husband, and British-American actress Sybil Christopher founded the Bay Street Theater in Sag Harbor, New York. This independent non-profit theatre is still in operation as of 2026. Walton-Hamilton was the theater's artistic co-director and director of education and programming for young audiences for 17 years.

She has voiced many audiobooks, including Gitty Daneshvari's School of Fear, Patrick McDonnell's Me . . . Jane, and Nancy Tafuri's All Kinds of Kisses. In 2010, she won the Grammy Award for Best Spoken Word Album for Children for voicing Julie Andrews' Collection of Poems, Songs and Lullabies.

In 2000, she began writing books for children in collaboration with her mother, starting with Dumpy the Dumptruck. They wrote 12 "Dumpy" books, which were illustrated by her father Tony Walton, who had remained friends with her mother despite their divorce. Walton-Hamilton and Andrews have co-written 35 children's books, including the "Dumpy" books, The Great American Mousical (2006), also illustrated by Walton, two "Bonnie Boadicea" novels for middle schoolers, The Very Fairy Princess (2010) series, and two unrelated novels. They have also co-edited two anthologies of poetry and songs, and one concept book, Thanks to You: Wisdom From Mother and Child. Walton-Hamilton has also written a book for adults, Raising Bookworms: Getting Kids Reading for Pleasure and Empowerment (2009). The book won a Parent's Choice Gold Medal, silver medals from the Living Now and IPPY Book Awards, and Honorable Mention from ForeWord Magazine's Best Book of the Year. A Bridport Prize-winning poet, her poetry collection, "Door to Door," was published by Andrews McMeel in 2022.

In 2016, Walton Hamilton co-created the preschool television series Julie's Greenroom with her mother Julie Andrews and Judy Rothman-Rofé. The show stars Andrews, joined by her assistant Gus (Giullian Yao Gioiello) and the Greenies, a cast of original puppets built by The Jim Henson Company. The show premiered on Netflix in 2017. She and her mother also co-hosted and co-produced Julie's Library, a story-time podcast for family audiences produced by American Public Media in 2020.

She is the co-creator (with Julie Hedlund and Katie Davis) of Picture Book Summit, the world-class, annual online conference for picture book writers, and The Complete Picture Book Submissions System, an online course that answers every question about submitting picture books to agents and editors. Independently, Walton Hamilton offers home-study courses and other products and resources for writers at her website.

== Personal life ==
In 1991, Emma Walton married actor/director Stephen Hamilton. They have a son and a daughter.

== Filmography ==
Film
Year	Title	Role	Notes
1983	Curse of the Pink Panther	Angry Hooker	As Emma Walton
1984	Micki + Maude	Maude's Nurse	As Emma Walton
1986	A Fine Mess	First Extra	As Emma Walton
1986	That's Life!	Kate Fairchild	As Emma Walton
1987	Blind Date	Muggette #1	As Emma Walton
1991	Switch	Fur Protestor	As Emma Walton

Television
Year	Title	Role	Notes
1995	Great Performances	Herself	As Emma Walton; 1 Episode: "Julie Andrews: Back on Broadway"
1988	As the World Turns	Lenore Cassidy	As Emma Walton; CBS
2012	Today	Herself – Guest	As Emma Walton; 1 Episode: "Episode dated 4 October 2012"
2007–2012	Rachael Ray	Herself	4 Episodes: "A Dame of a Mystery Taster" (2007), as Emma Walton; "Episode #4.39" (2009), as Emma Walton; "Julie Andrews & Nick Cannon" (2011); "Julie Andrews and Holiday Decorating" (2012)
2017	Julie's Greenroom	Co-Creator, Executive Producer, Writer	Netflix Original Series

== Publications ==
- Dumpy the Dumptruck (2000)
- Dumpy at School (2000)
- Dumpy and His Pals (2001)
- Dumpy Saves Christmas (2001)
- Dumpy's Friends on the Farm (2001)
- Dumpy and the Big Storm (2002)
- Dumpy and the Firefighters (2003)
- Simeon's Gift (2003)
- Dragon: Hound of Honor (2004)
- Dumpy to the Rescue! (2004)
- Dumpy's Apple Shop (2004)
- Dumpy's Happy Holiday (2004)
- Dumpy's Extra-Busy Day (2006)
- Dumpy's Valentine (2006)
- The Great American Mousical (2006)
- Thanks To You: Wisdom From Mother and Child (2007)
- Julie Andrews' Collection of Poems, Songs, and Lullabies (2009)
- Raising Bookworms: Getting Kids Reading for Pleasure and Empowerment (2009)
- Little Bo in Italy: The Continued Adventures of Bonnie Boadicea (2010)
- The Very Fairy Princess (2010)
- The Very Fairy Princess Takes the Stage (2011)
- Julie Andrews' Treasury for All Seasons: Poems and Songs to Celebrate the Year (2012)
- Little Bo In London: The Ultimate Adventure of Bonnie Boadicea (2012)
- The Very Fairy Princess: A Very Fairy Christmas (2012)
- The Very Fairy Princess: Here Comes the Flower Girl! (2012)
- The Very Fairy Princess: A Fairy Merry Christmas (2012)
- The Very Fairy Princess: Follows Her Heart (2013)
- The Very Fairy Princess: Sparkles In the Snow (2013)
- The Very Fairy Princess: Teacher's Pet (2013)
- The Very Fairy Princess: Graduation Girl! (2014)
- The Very Fairy Princess Doodle Book (2014)
- The Very Fairy Princess: A Spooky, Sparkly Halloween (2015)
- The Very Fairy Princess: Attitude of Gratitude (2016)
- Home Work: A Memoir of My Hollywood Years (2019)
- The First Notes: The Story of Do, Re, Mi (2022)
- Door to Door (2022)
- The Enchanted Symphony (2023)
- Waiting in the Wings (2024)
- The Great American Mousical: Revised Edition (2025)
- Shy (2026)

== Awards ==
- Nine New York Times Bestsellers
- Three Time #1 Bestseller
- Parents Choice Gold Medal
- Living Now Silver Medal
- IPPY Book Awards Silver Medal
- Grammy Award, Best Spoken Word Album for Children
- Bridport Prize for poetry
- Two time Emmy nominee
