= Peter Gunn (film) =

- Genre: Crime; Drama
- Written by: Blake Edwards
- Directed by: Blake Edwards
- Starring: Peter Strauss; Peter Jurasik; Jennifer Edwards; Barbara Williams; David Rappaport; Pearl Bailey
- Music by: Henry Mancini
- Country of origin: United States
- Original language: English

Production
- Executive producer: Blake Edwards
- Producers: Tony Adams; Michael Dinner
- Production location: Los Angeles
- Cinematography: Arthur R. Botham
- Editor: Robert Pergament
- Running time: 90 minutes
- Production company: New World Television

Original release
- Network: ABC
- Release: April 23, 1989

Peter Gunn is a 1989 American made-for-television crime drama film directed by Blake Edwards. It was intended as a pilot to relaunch the Peter Gunn franchise starring Peter Strauss in the role of private detective Peter Gunn.

The pilot was aired on ABC on April 23, 1989, but a TV series was not commissioned. The idea of a revival began in 1977 when E. Jack Neuman was approached to write a made-for-TV movie to bring back the original Peter Gunn, Craig Stevens to the role. The project ended because of Blake Edwards' film shooting schedule. Edwards once again announced a TV movie version in 1984 which was intended to star Robert Wagner as Gunn. This eventually became the 1989 TV movie starring Peter Strauss.

== Plot ==
Detective Peter Gunn is asked by mob boss Tomy Amatti to find the murderer of a friend Spiros' brother. Although he is working outside from the mob, Gunn is nonetheless pursued by mobsters, the cops and interested women. The story heats up when Gunn finds information that suggests the cops are being framed.

== Cast ==
- Peter Strauss as Peter Gunn
- Peter Jurasik as Lieutenant Jacoby
- Barbara Williams as Edie Hart
- Jennifer Edwards as Maggie
- Pearl Bailey as Mother
- David Rappaport as Speck
- Charles Cioffi as Tony Amatti
- Richard Portnow as Spiros
- Debra Sandlund as Sheila
- Leo Rossi as Detective Russo
- Tony Longo as Sergeant Holstead
- Chazz Palminteri as Soldier
