= Larry Storch =

American actor (1923–2022)

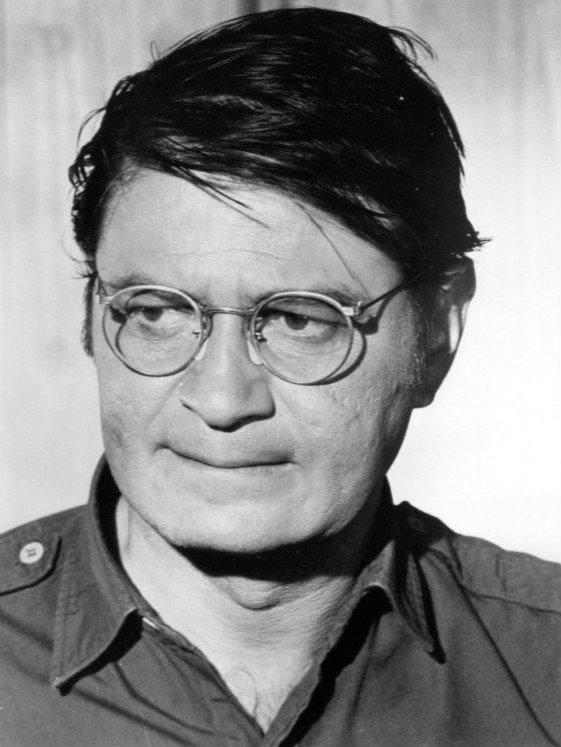
- Storch in 1967
- Born: Lawrence Samuel Storch; January 8, 1923; New York City, U.S.
- Died: July 8, 2022 (aged 99); New York City, U.S.
- Occupations: Actor; comedian
- Years active: 1939–2022
- Spouse: Norma Catherine Greve (m. 1961; died 2003)
- Children: 3

Lawrence Samuel Storch (January 8, 1923 – July 8, 2022) was an American actor and comedian known for his comic television roles, including voice-over work for cartoon shows such as Mr. Whoopee on Tennessee Tuxedo and His Tales. For his portrayal of the bumbling Corporal Randolph Agarn on F Troop he was nominated for an Emmy Award in 1967.

== Early life ==
Lawrence Samuel Storch was born in New York City on January 8, 1923, the son of Alfred Storch, a cabdriver and broker, and his wife, Sally Kupperman Storch, a telephone operator, jewelry-store owner and rooming-house operator. The Washington Post reported that he was born in the Bronx, whereas The New York Times reported that he was born in Manhattan and The Wall Street Journal reported that he was born on the Upper West Side. His parents were observant Jews. He attended DeWitt Clinton High School in the Bronx with Don Adams, who remained his lifelong friend. Storch said that, because of hard times in the Great Depression, he never graduated from high school, instead finding work as a comic for $12 a week, opening for bandleader Al Donahue at the band shell in Sheepshead Bay.

During World War II, he served in the United States Navy, where he was shipmates with Tony Curtis on the submarine tender USS Proteus (AS-19).

== Career ==
=== Performing ===
Storch was originally a comic. It led to guest appearances on dozens of television series: Mannix; Car 54, Where Are You?; Hennesey; Get Smart; Sergeant Bilko; Columbo; CHiPs; Fantasy Island; McCloud; Emergency!; The Flying Nun; Alias Smith and Jones; The Alfred Hitchcock Hour; That Girl; I Dream of Jeannie; Gomer Pyle, U.S.M.C.; Gilligan's Island; The Doris Day Show; The Persuaders; Love, American Style; All in the Family; Kolchak: The Night Stalker and Married... with Children.

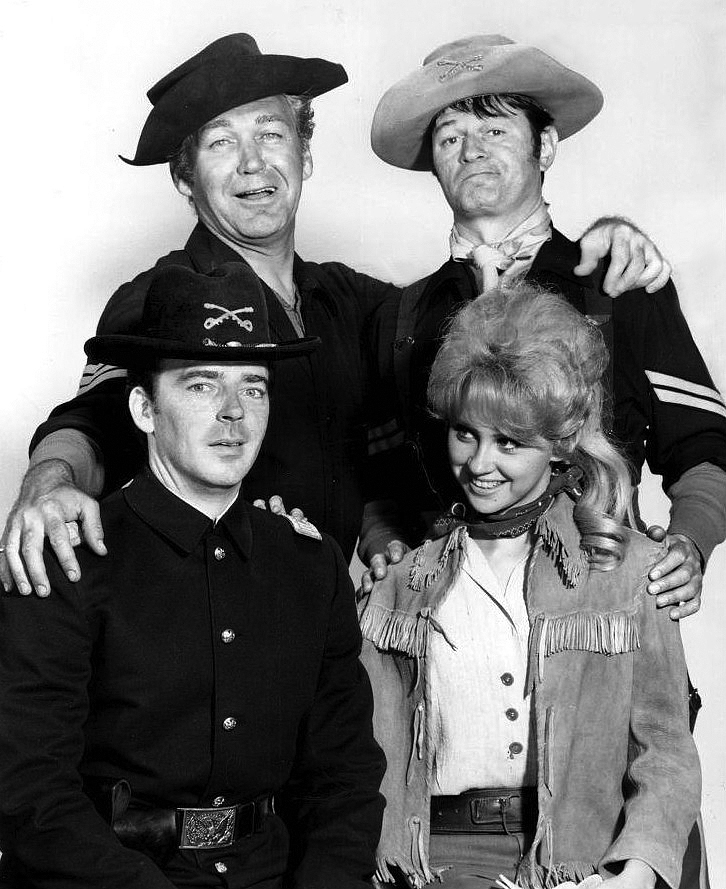
Storch, top right, with F Troop cast (1965)

Storch was probably best known as the scheming Corporal Randolph Agarn on the 1965-67 situation comedy series F Troop, with Forrest Tucker, Ken Berry and Melody Patterson, for which he was nominated for an Emmy Award in 1967. Other memorable performances from the 1960s were Texas Jack in the barroom brawl scene of The Great Race and the eponymous character in the Groovy Guru episode of Get Smart.

In 1975, Storch teamed again with Forrest Tucker, co-starring with Bob Burns (who wore a gorilla costume) in the short-lived but popular Saturday morning children's series The Ghost Busters. He also appeared on The Love Boat, S1 E15 & S2 E9 (1978); was Al Bundy's childhood hero on Married... with Children (Al Bundy's daughter Kelly attended an acting school operated by Larry); and was a semi-regular on Car 54, Where Are You?. He co-starred on the short-lived series The Queen and I.

=== Variety show appearances ===
Storch appeared on many variety shows, including Sonny and Cher, Laugh-In, Hollywood Squares, Playboy After Dark, and The Hollywood Palace, with several appearances on The Ed Sullivan Show, The Tonight Show Starring Johnny Carson, and The Steve Allen Show. Jackie Gleason asked Storch to fill in for him in the summer of 1953 while Gleason was on hiatus. It led to the 10-episode The Larry Storch Show with guest stars including Janet Blair, Risë Stevens, Dick Haymes, and Cab Calloway.

=== As an impressionist and voiceover actor ===
An impressionist, Storch recreated hundreds of voices and dialects ranging from Muhammad Ali to Claude Rains and voiced characters in many television and film animations, including The Pink Panther Show, Groovie Goolies, The Inspector, The Brady Kids, Cool Cat, Koko the Clown, Treasure Island, and Tennessee Tuxedo.

During the late 1960s, Storch worked with Mel Blanc and June Foray at Warner Bros.-Seven Arts, voicing cartoon characters such as Merlin the Magic Mouse and Cool Cat. He continued his association with Filmation as a voiceover actor in other series and films the company produced, including Journey Back to Oz (1972) where he voiced Amos, farmhand to Aunt Em and Uncle Henry.

=== Film appearances ===
Storch appeared in more than 25 Hollywood films, including Gun Fever (1958), Who Was That Lady? (1960), 40 Pounds of Trouble (1962), Captain Newman, M.D. (1963), Wild and Wonderful (1964), Sex and the Single Girl (1964), and The Great Race (1965). He also appeared in Bus Riley's Back in Town (1965), A Very Special Favor (1965), That Funny Feeling, (1965), The Great Bank Robbery (1969), Airport 1975 (1974), The Happy Hooker Goes to Washington (1977), Record City (1978), S.O.B (1981), Fake-Out (1982), Sweet Sixteen (1983), and A Fine Mess (1986), as well as the cult sci-fi films The Monitors (1969) and Without Warning (1980). Tony Curtis and Storch reunited for a 2003 run of the musical version of Some Like It Hot. In 2005, he worked with Anthony Michael Hall in Funny Valentine and appeared in the documentary feature The Aristocrats.

=== Stage work ===
After success in television and films, Storch returned to the New York stage, having first performed on the Broadway stage in the 1950s. He received rave reviews for the Off-Broadway production of Breaking Legs. Co-starring Philip Bosco and Vincent Gardenia, the show extended several times before going on the road. Storch appeared in the Broadway productions of Porgy and Bess (which Storch considered his favorite), Arsenic and Old Lace with Jean Stapleton, Marion Ross, and Jonathan Frid, and Annie Get Your Gun with Reba McEntire. He toured the United States and Europe with Porgy and Bess.

In 2004, he was in Sly Fox with Richard Dreyfuss and his old friend Irwin Corey. Larry, then 81 and "Professor" Corey, 90, did eight shows a week. In March 2008, Storch celebrated his 50th anniversary performing on Broadway. His first Broadway appearance had been Who Was That Lady I Saw You With, later made into a 1960 film starring Dean Martin and Tony Curtis, with Storch appearing.

Storch and Dark Shadows star Marie Wallace appeared in Love Letters by A. R. Gurney on June 24, 2012, a benefit performance for the Actor's Temple in New York City.

In the summer of 2012, Storch appeared in a benefit performance of Love Letters with actress Diana Sowle (best known for her role as Mrs. Bucket in the original Willy Wonka film) in Farmville, Virginia to benefit The Tom Mix Rangers.

=== Comedy LPs ===
Storch recorded a comedy LP, Larry Storch at The Bon Soir, released by Jubilee Records in the 1960s. His other records include Larry Storch Reads Philip Roth's Epstein and singles such as "Pooped" b/w "The Eighth Wonder Of The World" and a spoken-word cover of Fats Domino's "I'm Walkin'".

A month before he died, Storch recorded the blues song Drinkin' Wine Spo-Dee-O-Dee with Mike Clark and his trio. The song was released soon after Storch's death.

== Personal life ==
Storch married actress Norma Catherine Greve on July 10, 1961. They remained married until her death at age 81 on August 28, 2003. Both briefly appeared in the made-for-television movie The Woman Hunter (1972). He had three children: a stepson, Lary May; a daughter, Candace Herman, the result of a brief encounter with his future wife, born in 1947 and placed for adoption (and later reunited); and a stepdaughter, June Cross, born in 1954 to Norma and Jimmy Cross ("Stump" of the song-and-dance team Stump and Stumpy).

Storch's younger brother, Jay (1924–1987), was an actor/voiceover performer under the name Jay Lawrence.

== Death ==
Storch died at his home on the Upper West Side of Manhattan on July 8, 2022, at the age of 99. The Associated Press reported that he died from natural causes. The Washington Post reported that he died from complications of Alzheimer's disease.

== Honors and tributes ==
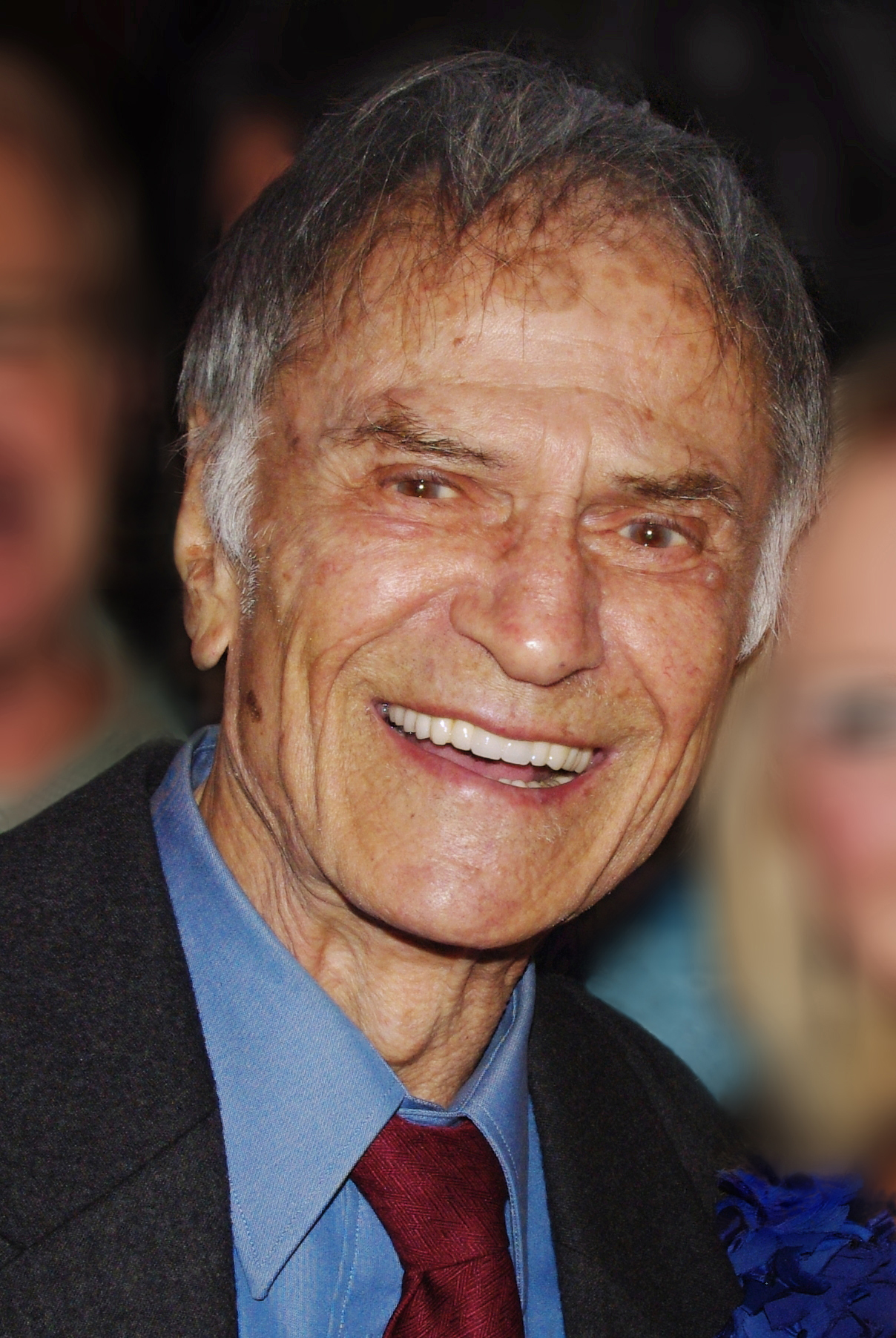
Storch in 2011

Storch was nominated for a Primetime Emmy Award in 1967 for Outstanding Continued Performance by an Actor in a Leading Role in a Comedy Series for F Troop. Storch lost to childhood friend Don Adams that year. Storch said he later remarked to Adams, “You kept it on the block.”

An episode of Animaniacs titled "The Sound of Warners" features a banner that says "Larry Storch Days / Nov 13 & 14".

In Fort Lee, New Jersey, Mayor Mark Sokolich named Storch as honorary Mayor for a Day on June 1, 2014. Storch had previously been honored by the local film commission for performing at the Riviera nightclub, which had closed 60 years earlier. He received the 2013 Barrymore Award for Lifetime Achievement in Film and TV from the Fort Lee Film Commission.

A Golden Palm Star on the Palm Springs, California, Walk of Stars was dedicated to Storch in 2014.

Storch was named an honorary citizen of Passaic, New Jersey, on September 13, 2016. He also received a Navy Distinguished Service Medal to recognise his World War II service.

On January 14, 2019, The Lambs honored Storch with their Shepherd's Award.

Wild West City, an amusement park in New Jersey, renamed one of its storefronts “Larry Storch’s Silver Dollar Saloon” in his honor.

Storch was named an Honorary Friar in early 2019 at a ceremony with Dick Cavett at the New York Friars Club.

On his 97th birthday, Storch was presented with a Proclamation from the State of New York.

== Filmography ==
Year	Title	Role	Notes
1951	The Prince Who Was a Thief		
1958	Gun Fever	Amigo	
1959	The Last Blitzkrieg	Ennis	
1960	Who Was That Lady?	Orenov	
1962	40 Pounds of Trouble	Floyd	
1963	The Alfred Hitchcock Hour	Oscar Blenny	Season 1 Episode 26: "An Out for Oscar"
1963	Captain Newman, M.D.	Corporal Gavoni	
1964	Wild and Wonderful	Rufus Gibbs	
1964	Sex and the Single Girl	Motorcycle Cop	
1965–1967	F Troop	Corporal Randolph Agarn	
1965	Gilligan's Island	Bank Robber Jackson Frell (also credited as Jackson Farrell)	Season 1 Episode "Little Island, Big Gun"
1965	Bus Riley's Back in Town	Howie	
1965	Pink Panther	Narrator / Talking Weight Machine / Man	Two shorts
1965	The Great Race	Texas Jack	
1965	A Very Special Favor	Harry the Taxi Driver	
1965	That Funny Feeling	Luther	
1965–1966	The Inspector	The Commissioner / Surgeon	Two shorts
1967	I Dream of Jeannie	Sam	S3E1 Fly Me to the Moon
1968	Mannix	Bernie Farmer	S1E20 Another Final Exit
1968	That Girl	John McKenzie	
1968	Gomer Pyle – USMC	General Manuel Cortez	S4E15 & S5E12
1969	Get Smart	Groovy Guru	Episode: "The Groovy Guru"
1969	The Great Bank Robbery	Juan	
1969	The Monitors	P.A. Stutz	
1969–1970	The Pink Panther Show	The Commissioner / Surgeon / Narrator / Talking Weight Machine / Man	10-12 episodes
1970	Hard Frame	Rudy LeRoy	TV movie
1970	Groovie Goolies	Drac / Wolfie / Various	TV Animation
1971	The Persuaders	Angie	S1E10 Angie...Angie
1971	Aesop's Fables	Hare, Rooster and Old Tortoise	Voice, TV movie
1972	Journey Back to Oz	Amos	Voice
1972	The Couple Takes a Wife	David	ABC Movie of the Week
1972	The Woman Hunter	Raconteur	
1973	Emergency!	Ben Wesley and Jake the Escape Artist	S2E6 Saddled & S3E14 Computer Error
1973	Treasure Island	Captain Smollett	Voice
1973	All In The Family	Bill Mulheron	S3E16 Oh Say Can You See
1974	Oliver Twist	Magistrate Fang	Voice
1974	Columbo	Mr. Weekly	Negative Reaction
1974	Airport 1975	Glenn Purcell	
1977	The Happy Hooker Goes to Washington	Robby Boggs	
1978	Record City	Deaf Man	
1979	Jack Frost	Papa	Voice
1980	Without Warning	Scoutmaster	
1981	S.O.B.	The Guru	
1981	Peter-No-Tail	Max	Voice, English version
1982	Fake-Out	Ted	
1982	The Flight of Dragons	Pawnbroker	Voice
1983	Sweet Sixteen	Earl	
1986	The Perils of P.K.		
1986	A Fine Mess	Leopold Klop	
1987	Medium Rare		
1992	I Don't Buy Kisses Anymore	Giora	
1994	The Silence of the Hams	Sergeant	
1995	Married... with Children	Himself	Episode: Something Larry This Way Comes (S9, E21)
2005	Funny Valentine	Dennis	
2005	Bittersweet Place	Ira Tatz	
2005	The Aristocrats	Himself	Final Role
