= Harry Stradling Jr. =

American cinematographer (1925–2017)

- Born: January 7, 1925; Yonkers, New York, U.S.
- Died: October 17, 2017 (aged 92); Los Angeles, California, U.S.
- Occupation: Cinematographer
- Years active: 1944–1988
- Children: 5
- Father: Harry Stradling
- Family: Walter Stradling (great uncle)

Harry Stradling Jr., ASC (January 7, 1925 – October 17, 2017) was an American cinematographer. He was twice nominated for the Academy Award for Best Cinematography, for 1776 (1972) and The Way We Were (1973).

== Life and career ==
Stradling was born in Yonkers, New York in 1925. His father was two-time Oscar-winning cinematographer Harry Stradling. His great-uncle, Walter Stradling, was also a cinematographer.

He worked on four Blake Edwards films and six films by Burt Kennedy. (See: List of film director and cinematographer collaborations). He was acclaimed in particular as a skilled cinematographer in Westerns. He was nominated for two Oscars, for 1776 and The Way We Were, and for a Primetime Emmy for George Washington. He also did cinematography on 87 episodes of Gunsmoke, and shot 21 of the total 23 episodes of the TV show Cimarron Strip.

Stradling's work on Westerns, including both Gunsmoke and Cimarron Strip as well as feature films including the 1969 Western comedy Support Your Local Sheriff! (1969), brought him to the heavily filmed Iverson Movie Ranch in Chatsworth, Los Angeles, California, where he has been cited as one of the most adept cinematographers of his era when it came to capturing the unique cinematic attributes of the location's massive sandstone boulders.

== Filmography ==
=== Film ===
Year	Title	Director	Notes
1965	Synanon	Richard Quine	
1967	Welcome to Hard Times	Burt Kennedy	1st of 6 collaborations with Kennedy
1968	With Six You Get Eggroll	Howard Morris	
1969	Support Your Local Sheriff!	Burt Kennedy	
1969	The Mad Room	Bernard Girard	
1969	Young Billy Young	Burt Kennedy	
1969	The Good Guys and the Bad Guys	Burt Kennedy	
1970	There Was a Crooked Man...	Joseph L. Mankiewicz	
1970	Dirty Dingus Magee	Burt Kennedy	
1970	Little Big Man	Arthur Penn	
1971	Support Your Local Gunfighter	Burt Kennedy	
1971	Fools' Parade	Andrew V. McLaglen	1st of 3 collaborations with McLaglen
1971	The Late Liz	Dick Ross	
1971	Something Big	Andrew V. McLaglen	
1972	Skyjacked	John Guillermin	
1972	Thumb Tripping	Quentin Masters	
1972	1776	Peter H. Hunt	
1973	The Man Who Loved Cat Dancing	Richard C. Sarafian	
1973	The Way We Were	Sydney Pollack	
1974	McQ	John Sturges	
1974	Nightmare Honeymoon	Elliot Silverstein	
1974	Bank Shot	Gower Champion	
1975	Bite the Bullet	Richard Brooks	
1975	Mitchell	Andrew V. McLaglen	
1975	Rooster Cogburn	Stuart Millar	
1976	Midway	Jack Smight	
1976	The Big Bus	James Frawley	
1976	Special Delivery	Paul Wendkos	
1977	The Greatest	Tom Gries	
1977	Damnation Alley	Jack Smight	
1978	Convoy	Sam Peckinpah	
1978	Go Tell the Spartans	Ted Post	
1978	Born Again	Irving Rapper	
1979	Prophecy	John Frankenheimer	
1980	Carny	Robert Kaylor	
1980	Up the Academy	Robert Downey Sr.	
1981	S.O.B.	Blake Edwards	1st of 4 collaborations with Edwards
1981	The Pursuit of D. B. Cooper	Roger Spottiswoode	
1981	Buddy Buddy	Billy Wilder	
1982	O'Hara's Wife	William Bartman	
1984	Micki & Maude	Blake Edwards	
1986	A Fine Mess	Blake Edwards	
1987	Blind Date	Blake Edwards	
1988	Caddyshack II	Allan Arkush	

=== Television ===
Year	Title	Notes
1964−67	Gunsmoke	86 episodes
1967−68	Cimarron Strip	21 episodes
1970	Storefront Lawyers	1 episode

==== TV films and miniseries ====
Year	Film
1984	George Washington

== Awards and nominations ==
Award	Year	Category	Work	Result	Ref.
Academy Award	1973	Best Cinematography	1776	Nominated	
Academy Award	1974	Best Cinematography	The Way We Were	Nominated	
Primetime Emmy Awards	1984	Outstanding Cinematography for a Limited Series or Movie	George Washington	Nominated	
