= Jennifer Edwards =

American actress

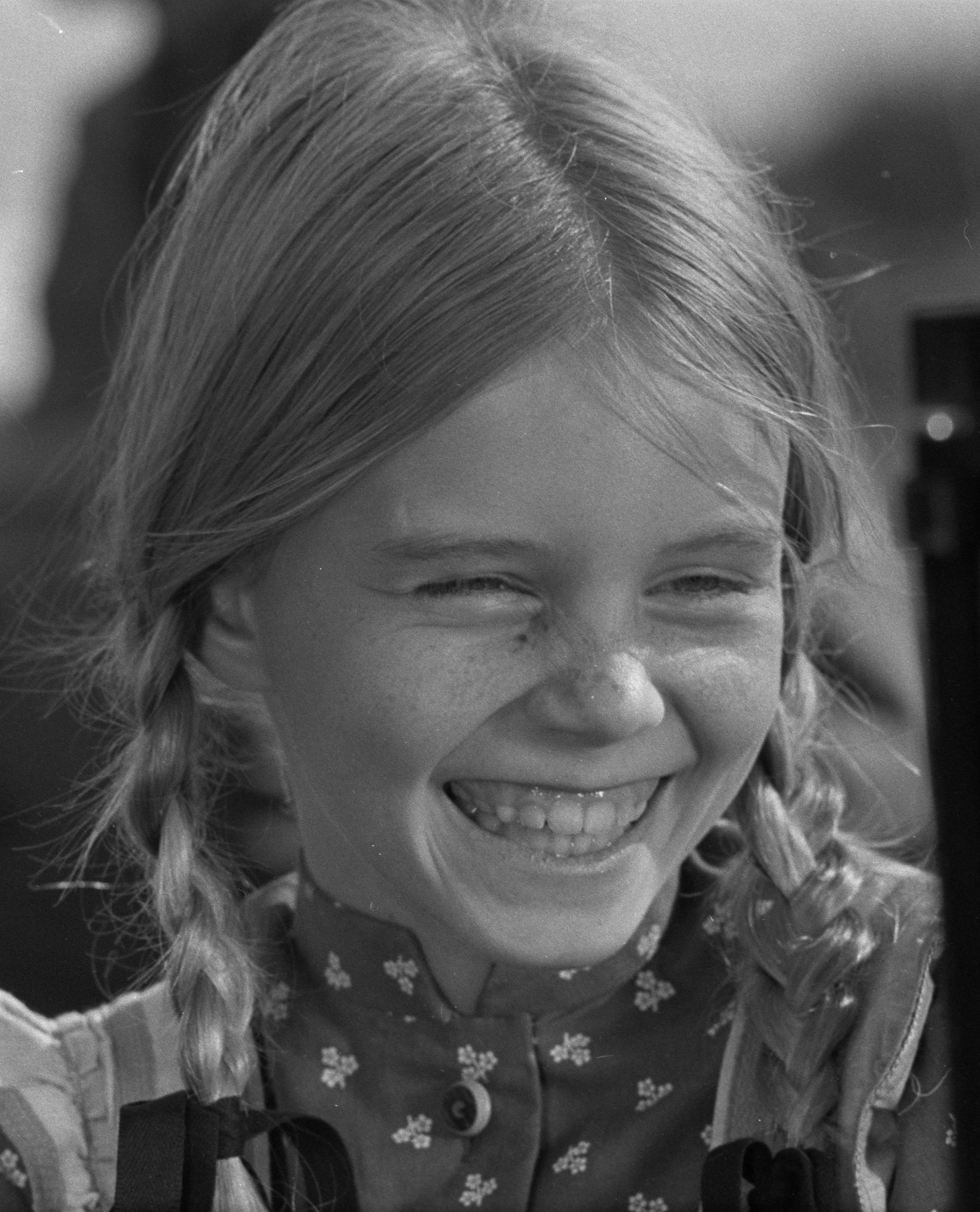
- Edwards in Heidi (1968)
- Born: Los Angeles, California, U.S.
- Occupation: Actress
- Years active: 1962–present
- Children: 2
- Father: Blake Edwards
- Relatives: Julie Andrews (stepmother); Emma Walton Hamilton (step-sister)

Jennifer Edwards is an American actress. She came to national prominence for her role in the 1968 NBC made-for-television movie Heidi.

== Career ==
Edwards's best known role was the NBC made-for-television movie Heidi (which interrupted the conclusion of the New York Jets vs. Oakland Raiders game now called The Heidi Bowl), which aired on November 17, 1968. Prior to the Jets-Raiders Sunday Night Football game on November 12, 2023, Edwards appeared in the introduction recalling the incident.

Besides acting in a number of movies, she also co-wrote the 1988 television movie Justin Case with her father.

== Personal life ==
Edwards is the daughter of Patricia Walker and filmmaker Blake Edwards. Her stepmother is actress Julie Andrews.

Edwards has two daughters.

== Filmography ==
=== Film ===
Year	Title	Role	Notes
1962	Days of Wine and Roses	Debbie Clay (age 5)	Uncredited
1969	Hook, Line & Sinker	Jennifer Ingersoll	
1972	The Carey Treatment	Lydia Barrett	
1981	S.O.B.	Lila	
1983	The Man Who Loved Women	Nancy	
1986	A Fine Mess	Ellen Frankenthaler	
1986	That's Life!	Megan Fairchild Bartlet	
1987	The Perfect Match	Nancy Bryant	
1988	Sunset	Victoria Alperin	
1989	All's Fair	Ann	
1990	Overexposed	Helen	
1992	Life on the Edge	Suzi	
1993	Son of the Pink Panther	Yussa	
2002	Vampire Clan	Jodi Remington	
2005	180	Diana	Short film
2006	The Accountant		Short film
2010	Dilf	Liz's Mom	Short film
2023	V/H/S/85	Barb	Segment: "No Wake"/"Ambrosia"

=== Television ===
Year	Title	Role	Notes
1968	Heidi	Heidi	Television film
1969	My Three Sons	Iris	Episode: "Ernie Is Smitten"
1970	Death Valley Days	Glinda	Episode: "The Wizard of Aberdeen"
1973	Go Ask Alice	Chris	Television film
1983	Making of a Male Model	Laurie	Television film
1983	Little Shots	D'Arcy's Mother	Television film
1984	The Ferret	Molly	Television film
1986	Gung Ho	Audrey	Episode: "Pilot"
1989	Father Dowling Mysteries	Fake Mrs. Jerico	Episode: "The Missing Body Mystery. Part 1"
1989	Peter Gunn	Maggie	Television film
1992	Star Trek: The Next Generation	Ms. Kyle	Episode: "New Ground"
1992	Julie	Clem	2 episodes
1997	Women: Stories of Passion	Joan	Episode: "The Bitter and the Sweet"
1998	The Nanny	Society Woman #2	Episode: "The Dinner Party"
1999	Hard Time: The Premonition	Female Cop	Television film
2000	The Magnificent Seven	Hannah	Episode: "Penance"
2001	Spyder Games	Valerie Whitmore	Recurring role, 12 episodes
2015	The Middle Ages	Host, Wife	2 episodes
