= The Big Bus =

1976 film by James Frawley

- film poster by Jack Davis
- Directed by: James Frawley
- Written by: Lawrence J. Cohen; Fred Freeman
- Produced by: Lawrence J. Cohen; Fred Freeman
- Starring: Joseph Bologna; Stockard Channing; John Beck; Ned Beatty; José Ferrer; Ruth Gordon; Harold Gould; Larry Hagman; Sally Kellerman; Richard Mulligan; Lynn Redgrave
- Cinematography: Harry Stradling Jr.
- Edited by: Edward Warschilka
- Music by: David Shire
- Distributed by: Paramount Pictures
- Release date: June 23, 1976
- Running time: 88 minutes
- Country: United States
- Language: English

The Big Bus is a 1976 American satirical comedy film directed by James Frawley, and starring Joseph Bologna, Stockard Channing, and John Beck. Parodying the then-popular disaster genre, it follows the maiden cross-country trip of an enormous nuclear-powered bus named Cyclops.

The Big Bus initially received mixed reviews, although The New York Times gave the film a favorable review. The film performed poorly at the box office but has since been recognized as a cult classic of its genre. Frawley won the audience award at the 1977 Avoriaz Fantastic Film Festival.

== Plot ==
Coyote Bus Lines' scientists and designers work feverishly to complete Cyclops, a state-of-the-art articulated jumbo bus, enabling man to achieve a new milestone in bus history, namely non-stop service between New York City and Denver. Almost immediately after the bus engine is equipped with nuclear fuel, a bomb goes off, critically injuring Professor Baxter, the scientist in charge of the project. Cyclops itself is undamaged, but Coyote Bus Lines has lost both its driver and co-driver.

Kitty Baxter, the professor's daughter and the Cyclops designer, is forced to turn to old flame Dan Torrance. Once a promising driver, Torrance was disgraced after he crashed his bus on Mount Diablo, and was accused of saving his own life by eating all of his passengers. (Torrance blames his co-driver for cannibalism, insisting that he himself survived by eating the seats and the luggage, and only ate part of a passenger's foot by accident when it was included in a stew.) Narrowly surviving an assault by vindictive fellow drivers with the help of "Shoulders" O'Brien, Torrance is recruited to drive Cyclops.

Meanwhile, a sinister tycoon known as "Ironman", encased in a huge iron lung, plots to destroy the bus with some oil sheikhs. Ironman directs his brother Alex to sabotage Cyclops using time bombs. Alex would prefer to use a man-made earthquake, but Ironman insists that the bus be destroyed and discredited. Before its maiden voyage, Alex sneaks aboard and hides a bomb in the bus.

Amidst public fanfare, the bus finally leaves New York, bound for Denver. Among the passengers are the Cranes, a neurotic married couple waiting for their divorce to finalize; Father Kudos, a priest who has lost his way; Dr. Kurtz, a disgraced veterinarian; Emery Bush, a man with only a few months to live; and Camille Levy, whose father died in the aforementioned Mount Diablo bus crash.

At first, Cyclops' journey is a success, and Torrance triumphantly breaks the 90 mph (140 km/h) "wind barrier" (referenced as "breaking wind"). Soon, however, disaster strikes. Investigating a mechanical problem, Dan discovers the bomb and disarms it just seconds before an explosion rips through another part of the bus. Now unable to stop, Cyclops speeds across America. Dan is determined to achieve Cyclops's historic goal of non-stop service to Denver, but he also needs to traverse a treacherously curvy road where his father died. Dan almost succeeds, but not before a truck smashes into the upper deck windshield, and the bus runs partially off the road, ending up teetering over a cliff. To save the bus, Dan and Shoulders shift all the weight to the back by jettisoning all of the passenger luggage and then pumping the vehicle's entire carbonated beverage supply into the galley at the opposite end.

Knowing he has only one more chance to destroy Cyclops, Alex finally persuades Ironman to use the earthquake. Unfortunately for Ironman, Alex somehow set the co-ordinates for Ironman's house instead.

Back on the road, Cyclops once again heads to its destination, but just 25 miles (40 km) outside of Denver, the front and rear halves of the bus split from each other.

== Cast ==
- Joseph Bologna as Capt. Dan Torrance
- Stockard Channing as Kitty Baxter
- John Beck as "Shoulders" O'Brien
- René Auberjonois as Father Joseph Kudos
- Ned Beatty as Shorty Scotty
- Bob Dishy as Dr. Kurtz
- José Ferrer as Ironman
- Ruth Gordon as the old lady
- Harold Gould as Professor Irwin Baxter
- Larry Hagman as the parking lot doctor
- Sally Kellerman as Sybil Crane
- Richard Mulligan as Claude Crane
- Lynn Redgrave as Camille Levy
- Richard B. Shull as Emery Bush
- Stuart Margolin as Alex the hot dog seller
- Howard Hesseman as Jack
- Mary Charlotte Wilcox as Mary Jane Beth Sue
- Walter Brooke as Mr. Ames
- Vic Tayback as Goldie
- Murphy Dunne as Tommy Joyce
- Vito Scotti as a barber
- Harry Holcombe as a priest
- James Jeter as the bus bartender
- Miriam Byrd-Nethery as the farmer's wife

== Production notes ==
=== Casting ===
On the director's commentary of the 1980 film The Blues Brothers, John Landis reveals that he cast Murphy Dunne as the leader of "Murph and the Magic Tones" because he had seen him as a cheesy lounge singer in an earlier film. Although Landis doesn't mention The Big Bus by name, the film was Dunne's only previous performance as a lounge singer.

=== The Cyclops ===
The Cyclops

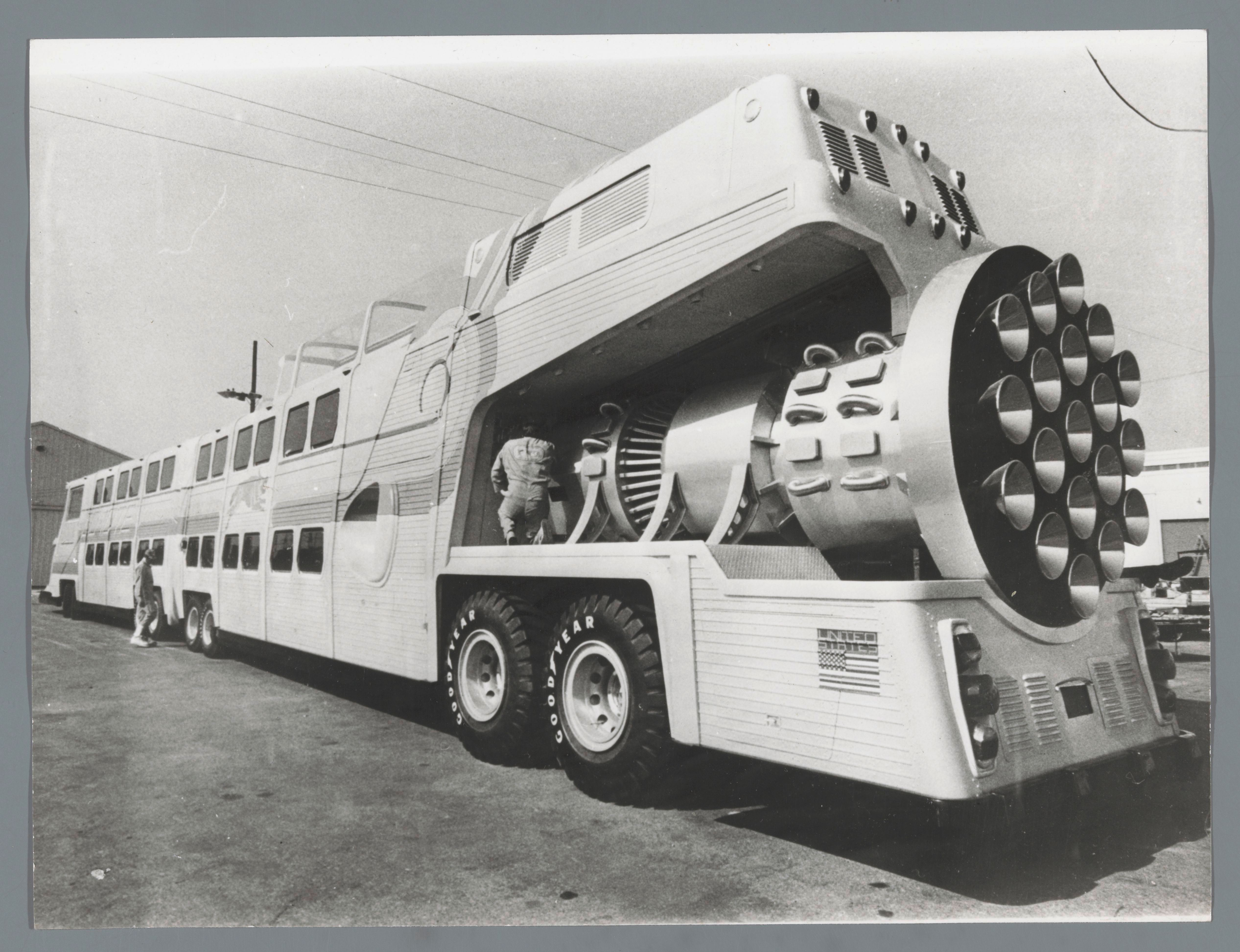
The bus from the rear

The central set piece of the film is the bus itself—credited for the design is the film's art director Joel Schiller. The bus is a nuclear powered, double-decker, articulated bus with 32 wheels. It is named Cyclops due to the single large headlight prominent at the front. The front also features large wraparound windows on both upper and lower decks—with the lower deck containing the cockpit and the upper, front portion containing the lounge/bar. Cyclops requires the operation of a driver and co-driver. In the film, Cyclops has a passenger capacity of 110 and is equipped with a bowling alley, Asian-style cocktail lounge with a piano bar, swimming pool, Bicentennial dining room, private marble-and-gold bathroom with sunken tub, and chef's kitchen. Exterior features shown are an automatic washing mechanism for the Cyclops exterior; an automatic en route tire-changing system; and a display of "Flags of all Nations," which emerges from the vehicle's roof. Cyclops can be compared to the German Neoplan Jumbocruiser, an actual double decker articulated super bus with a capacity of 170, originally built in 1975.

According to articles in 1976 issues of both Motor Trend magazine and the now defunct Bus World magazine, the real bus used in the film was a large road-worthy vehicle created by production designer Joel Schiller. Though the most visible front portions of the bus (bar and cockpit) appeared to be functional, the remainder of the body of the vehicle was mostly empty—containing only the engine, suspension and essential mechanisms used for exterior trick shots. Few behind-the-scenes and construction photos or plans have surfaced, but according to Joel Schiller's website, the actual bus built for the film was part of the Los Angeles Bicentennial Parade of 1976.

Further, the Bus World article stated that the vehicle made a trip from Los Angeles to San Diego, California, as a film promotion in 1976. The Bus World article also contained extensive photos and details about the building of the bus. The article states that the rear half of the bus was a separate vehicle with a driver. The two halves of the bus would arrive separately at the filming location where they were joined for shooting. The rear driver was unable to see and had to be directed by radio. In the scene in which the bus departs the terminal on its voyage, the front wheels on the rear portion of the bus are seen turning independently as the bus makes a very tight turn out of the terminal. According to car enthusiast web site Jalopnik.com, the bus was scrapped after filming.

In the closing credits, Trailways Bus Lines is thanked for their help in creating the bus used in the film. It is not stated what role Trailways took in creating Cyclops, although the footage of passengers boarding the bus in New York used Trailways Los Angeles bus station. The fictional bus line in the film that operates Cyclops is Coyote Bus Lines, a parody of Greyhound Lines.

== Soundtrack score ==
The score to the film was created by veteran film composer David Shire. His score was in line with the disaster parody theme of the film that also incorporated elements of disco. In the '90s, Film Score Monthly magazine ran a poll asking which film score its readers would most like to see released. The Big Bus was among the top 20 scores. In 2000, a bootleg CD of the film's soundtrack surfaced as a prized collectable.

In January 2011, a limited edition official release of the score was produced by Film Score Monthly (Catalog No. FSM1401). The compact disc was limited to 2000 copies and contained the film's complete score, including alternate takes and excerpts of classical pieces used in various scenes. The CD also contained comedy music and vocals bits by Murphy Dunne, who portrayed Tommy Joyce, the piano player in the bus' Oriental Lounge. The soundtrack release was sourced from the master tapes. As a result, sound quality was excellent and in stereo.

== Reception ==
The Big Bus received mixed reviews critically. The film holds a 64% rating on Rotten Tomatoes based on 14 reviews.

== Television broadcast ==
The Big Bus had its television premiere on CBS in March 1978, edited to remove some adult content and language to meet broadcast content standards of the time. Repeated in May 1980, the film has rarely been broadcast over the past 40 years on various channels, though it had been seen uncut as recently as 2009 on Turner Classic Movies (TCM) and Showtime.

As of 2009, Warner Bros. Television holds the USA TV broadcast rights while Paramount Pictures retains all other rights. Only the Warner Bros. logo appears on Showtime's airings and the original Paramount logo is preserved on TCM's print and the DVD issue.

== Home media ==
The film was released on VHS and Betamax in the early 1980s.

In 2002, Paramount Home Entertainment released the film on DVD in a dual-format edition containing the film in the full-screen or theatrical 2.40:1 aspect ratios, (though there is some slight windowboxing with the widescreen version selected); Dolby 5.1 English Surround Sound stereo/mono mix, or Dolby 2.0 mono in English, French, and Spanish. No other extras are included, and the DVD is out of print.

The film was also released on DVD in the United States on September 24, 2013, as a Warner Archive Collection DVD-R.

The film has also been released on Region 4 DVD.

Kino Lorber released a newly remastered version of the film on Blu-Ray in April 2023.

== See also ==
- List of American films of 1976
- Airplane!, 1980 disaster-genre parody film
- Speed, 1994 action movie about a bus rigged to explode if it drops below a certain speed
- Superbus (transport)
- Supertrain, 1979 NBC-TV series set on a nuclear-powered high-speed train
