= Micki & Maude =

1984 film by Blake Edwards

- Theatrical release poster
- Directed by: Blake Edwards
- Written by: Jonathan Reynolds
- Produced by: Tony Adams
- Starring: Dudley Moore; Amy Irving; Ann Reinking; Richard Mulligan; George Gaynes; Wallace Shawn
- Cinematography: Harry Stradling Jr.
- Edited by: Ralph E. Winters
- Music by: Lee Holdridge
- Production company: Hollywood Road Films
- Distributed by: Columbia Pictures
- Release date: December 21, 1984
- Running time: 118 minutes
- Country: United States
- Language: English
- Budget: $15.1 million
- Box office: $26,200,000

Micki & Maude is a 1984 American romantic comedy film directed by Blake Edwards and starring Dudley Moore. It co-stars actress and dancer Ann Reinking as Micki Salinger and Amy Irving as Maude Guillory Salinger.

With the exception of appearances as herself, as in the documentary Mad Hot Ballroom in 2005, this was Reinking's last acting role in a film.

In India, this film was remade in Tamil as Rettai Vaal Kuruvi starring Mohan, Archana, and Rathika Sarathkumar, and directed by Balu Mahindra. It was also remade in Malayalam as Pavakkoothu (1990) starring Jayaram, Parvathy and Ranjini. Tamil version was dubbed in Telugu as Rendu Thokala Pitta.

== Plot ==
In Los Angeles, Rob Salinger is an overworked tabloid television reporter. He is happily married to Micki, a lawyer who is a candidate to become a Superior Court judge. Rob longs to have a child and start a family, but Micki is reluctant due to a previous miscarriage and wanting to focus on her career. On an assignment, Rob interviews a young cellist, Maude Guillory. He is smitten with her, and although Maude knows Rob is married, they begin an affair. When Maude becomes pregnant, Rob proposes to her and promises to divorce his wife. Maude and her father, professional wrestler Barkhas Guillory, plan the wedding.

Before Rob can reveal his affair to Micki, she stuns him by happily announcing that she, too, is pregnant. She confesses that she initially planned on having an abortion, as a pregnancy would interfere with her career, before realizing how much she wants to have a family with him. Due to her previous miscarriage, Micki is recommended by her doctor to stay in bed during her pregnancy. Not wanting to risk Micki's health by confessing the truth, Rob remains married to her while proceeding with his wedding to Maude, claiming he got a divorce. With his boss and best friend Leo Brody covering for him, Rob divides his time between Micki and Maude, using work as an excuse.

Rob's scheme is successful until Micki and Maude, who originally had different due dates, go into labor on the same day, on the same floor of the same hospital. The two women end up becoming friends, but soon realize that Rob had been dishonest with them. After the babies are born, Micki and Maude both tell Rob that they want divorces and that Rob will never be allowed to visit the children; if Rob does not abide by the women's rules, they will have him arrested for bigamy. Rob follows them around, spying on the newborns from a distance, which both women end up noticing.

Eventually, Micki agrees to take Rob back, on the condition that he does not say anything to Maude, as the two women remained close friends. However, Rob also reconciles with Maude, promising not inform Micki. Although Leo warns Rob that he cannot maintain two relationships, Rob insists he will eventually reveal the truth to the women. Some time later, Micki's and Maude's careers thrive while Rob babysits two newborns and the six other children he has had over the years with the two women.

== Cast ==
- Dudley Moore as Rob Salinger
- Amy Irving as Maude Salinger
- Ann Reinking as Micki Salinger
- Richard Mulligan as Leo Brody
- George Gaynes as Dr. Eugene Glztszki
- Wallace Shawn as Dr. Elliot Fibel
- John Pleshette as Hap Ludlow
- H. B. Haggerty as Barkhas Guillory
- Lu Leonard as Nurse Verbeck
- Emma Walton as Maude's nurse
- Andre the Giant as himself
- Roger Rose as newscaster

== Production ==
The script was written by playwright Jonathan Reynolds. "I initially thought that the guy would be perceived as terrible," said Reynolds. "The biggest trick was to make him not be a swine. If you'd had Errol Flynn or Warren Beatty in that role you would've been in big trouble." So Reynolds stressed the protagonist Rob Salinger's devotion to children and to make it clear he was very much in love with both wives.

Blake Edwards was not originally available to direct. When Edwards left City Heat, he moved on to Micki and Maude. "I feel I do my best work with him," said Dudley Moore. "He lets me go. He doesn't force me to feel that I'm not doing the right thing."

The original version was set in New York and Reynolds says it was "sort of a slam-bang farce, with a very zippy pace." The director, said Reynolds, made it "much sweeter", slowed the pace and introduced the idea of one wife, Maude Guillory Salinger (Amy Irving), having a wrestler father. Hard Boiled Haggerty, a professional wrestler, was subsequently cast as Maude's father and Rob's father-in-law, Barkhas Guillory.

Along with Haggerty, the film features cameos from professional wrestlers Gene LeBell, Chief Jay Strongbow, Big John Studd, and André the Giant. Although the main cast also includes Wallace Shawn, it would not be until The Princess Bride in which he and André would work together onscreen.

Amy Irving later stated, "The role was difficult for me. It's not my forte to do comedy. You feel so exposed when you first try to do it, afraid that you'll appear ridiculous."

Filming began in April 1984. A month of shooting was left to do when Edwards fell ill with mononucleosis. Lou Antonio was brought in to complete the film and was credited as an executive producer. Nonetheless, the film came $1.6 million under budget.

== Release ==
Micki and Maude premiered on December 2, 1984, at Cinema III in New York City.

== Reception ==
"The last twenty minutes of Micki + Maude, as the two pregnant women move inexorably forward on their collision course, represents a kind of filmmaking that is as hard to do as anything you’ll ever see on a screen. The timing has to be flawless. So does the logic: One loose end, and the inevitability of a slapstick situation is undermined. Edwards and Moore are working at the top of their forms here, and the result is a pure, classic slapstick that makes Micki + Maude a real treasure." — Roger Ebert

The film was a box office disappointment, although it grossed $26.2 million against a budget of $15.1 million. The critical reception was mixed to positive. On review aggregator Rotten Tomatoes, the film has an approval rating of 64% based on 11 reviews, with an average score of 5.60/10. On Metacritic, the film received a score of 64 based on 11 reviews, indicating "generally favorable reviews".

== Awards and nominations ==
In 1985, Moore won the Golden Globe Award for Best Actor in a Motion Picture - Comedy/Musical. The film was also nominated for the Golden Globe Award for Best Motion Picture - Comedy/Musical at the 42nd Golden Globe Awards.

== Home video ==
Micki and Maude was released on VHS in 1985 and 1989 by RCA/Columbia Pictures Home Video and re-released in 1993 by Columbia TriStar Home Video. The DVD was released on November 3, 2003, by Columbia TriStar Home Entertainment.
