= A Fine Mess (film) =

1986 film by Blake Edwards

- Theatrical release poster
- Directed by: Blake Edwards
- Written by: Blake Edwards
- Produced by: Tony Adams
- Starring: Ted Danson; Howie Mandel; Richard Mulligan; Stuart Margolin; María Conchita Alonso; Jennifer Edwards; Paul Sorvino
- Cinematography: Harry Stradling, Jr.
- Music by: Henry Mancini
- Production company: Blake Edwards Entertainment
- Distributed by: Columbia Pictures
- Release date: August 8, 1986
- Running time: 90 minutes
- Country: United States
- Language: English
- Budget: $15 million
- Box office: $6,029,824

A Fine Mess is a 1986 American comedy film written and directed by Blake Edwards and starring Ted Danson and Howie Mandel.

The film was intended as a remake of Laurel & Hardy's classic short The Music Box and was to be semi-improvised in the same style as the director's earlier comedy The Party, but studio interference, poor previews and subsequent re-editing resulted in the film becoming a fully scripted chase comedy with very few of the original ideas for the film remaining intact. Writer/director Blake Edwards actually gave television interviews telling audiences to avoid the film. It received overwhelmingly negative reviews and performed poorly at the box office.

== Plot ==
While filming on location at a race track, womanizing bit actor Spencer Holden, who lives life on one scam after another, overhears a couple of inept thugs named Maurice "Binky" Drundza and Wayne "Turnip" Parragella while they dope a race horse Sorry Sue with a supposed undetectable super stimulant. The thugs find out that Spence overheard them and will do anything to catch him to prevent him from going to the authorities with the information. Spence, however, enlists the help of his best friend, drive-in carhop and aspiring restaurateur Dennis Powell, to bet on the race with that horse so that they can make some guaranteed money. Spence and Dennis end up having to outrun not only the thugs, who manage to put a few bullet holes in Spence's car, but also the police after they find Spence's bullet-riddled car and Sorry Sue dies from the drugs. The plot also includes an antique player piano of which Dennis comes into possession, sympathetic but naïve auction house employee Ellen Frankenthaler who is attracted to Dennis, and exotically beautiful Claudia Pazzo, the wife of local Italian mob boss Tony Pazzo, who is interested in buying the piano and whom Spence can't resist.

== Cast ==
- Ted Danson as Spence Holden
- Howie Mandel as Dennis Powell
- Richard Mulligan as Wayne "Turnip" Parragella
- Stuart Margolin as Maurice "Binky" Drundza
- María Conchita Alonso as Claudia Pazzo
- Jennifer Edwards as Ellen Frankenthaler
- Paul Sorvino as Tony Pazzo
- Rick Ducommun as Wardell Flecken
- Keye Luke as Ishimine
- Ed Herlihy as TV Reporter
- Walter Charles as Auctioneer
- Tawny Moyer as Leading Lady
- Emma Walton Hamilton as First Extra
- Carrie Leigh as Second Extra
- Sharan Lea as Young Girl
- Dennis Franz as Phil
- Larry Storch as Leopold Klop

== Critical reception ==
A Fine Mess received heavily negative reviews, including one from The New York Times, which stated "Mr. Edwards, who on happier occasions gave us The Pink Panther movies, piles on the pileups until you may suspect that he is trying to distract the audience from the absence of a diverting story or dialogue. The 11 musical numbers by some well-known performers (available, you can bet, on record and cassette) seem designed for the same purpose."

On review aggregator Rotten Tomatoes, the film has an approval rating of 25% based on 8 reviews, with an average score of 4.70/10. On Metacritic, the film has a weighted average score of 35 out of 100 based on 11 critics, indicating "generally unfavorable" reviews.

Then-U.S. President Ronald Reagan viewed this film at Camp David on September 12, 1986.

== Soundtrack ==
A Fine Mess

Soundtrack album by various artists
- Released: August 1986
- Genre: Soundtrack
- Length: 31:45
- Label: Motown
- Producers: Peter Bunetta; Rick Chudacoff; Rick James; Lindsey Buckingham; Richard Dashut; Nick Jameson; Steve Barri; Tony Peluso; Mark Davis; Los Lobos; Henry Mancini

Singles from A Fine Mess: Original Motion Picture Soundtrack
- 1. "A Fine Mess" Released: April 1986; 2. "Walk Like a Man" Released: July 1986

A Fine Mess: Original Motion Picture Soundtrack, the soundtrack for the film, was released on August 9, 1986, by Motown. It features performances by The Temptations, the Mary Jane Girls, Smokey Robinson, Los Lobos, Christine McVie, Nick Jameson, Billy Vera & The Beaters, and Henry Mancini, a longtime collaborator of Blake Edwards.

The album's lead single, the title track "A Fine Mess", was performed by The Temptations, written by Mancini and Dennis Lambert, and released on April 1, 1986. It peaked at number 63 on the Billboard Hot Black Singles chart and at 23 on the Adult Contemporary chart. A music video for the track was also completed that month, featuring The Temptations alongside Ted Danson and Howie Mandel. The video, which both promoted the movie and parodied typical promotional clips, was released two months prior to the film's debut.

The album's second single, a cover of the Four Seasons' "Walk Like a Man" by the Mary Jane Girls, was released in July and produced by Rick James. The song peaked at number 41 on the Billboard Hot 100. The accompanying music video, directed by John Jopson, featured the Mary Jane Girls performing alongside Mandel, who was dressed as a woman, and included clips from the film.

Fleetwood Mac's Christine McVie was signed to record a cover of "Can't Help Falling in Love" for the film's soundtrack. She enlisted bandmate Lindsey Buckingham and longtime collaborator, producer Richard Dashut, to produce the track. Fellow members, bassist John McVie and drummer Mick Fleetwood, were also brought in to play on the recording. This collaboration paved the way for the band's official reunion and the subsequent release of their 1987 album, Tango in the Night.

A "Special Edition" version of the soundtrack was later released on CD. It featured four bonus tracks: two additional songs from the film's soundtrack, "Don't Slow Down" by Mr. Mister and "Now I'm Talking About Now" by The Swimming Pool Q's, as well as extended remixes of the album's two singles, "A Fine Mess" and "Walk Like a Man".

=== Track listing ===
Side one
No.	Title	Writer(s)	Producer(s)	Length
1.	"A Fine Mess" (The Temptations)	Henry Mancini; Dennis Lambert	Peter Bunetta; Rick Chudacoff	4:03
2.	"Walk Like a Man" (Mary Jane Girls)	Bob Crewe; Bob Gaudio	Rick James	3:43
3.	"Easier Said Than Done" (Chico DeBarge)	William Linton; Larry Huff	P. Bunetta; R. Chudacoff	2:11
4.	"Can't Help Falling in Love" (Christine McVie)	Hugo Peretti; Luigi Creatore; George Weiss	Lindsey Buckingham; Richard Dashut	2:56
5.	"Slow Down" (Billy Vera & The Beaters)	Larry Williams	P. Bunetta; R. Chudacoff	2:42

Side two
No.	Title	Writer(s)	Producer(s)	Length
1.	"Love's Closing In" (Nick Jameson)	N. Jameson	N. Jameson	3:29
2.	"Wishful Thinking" (Smokey Robinson)	Bobby Sandstrom; Michael Price; David Bryant	Steve Barri; Tony Peluso	4:01
3.	"Moving So Close" (Burston & Littlejohn)	Keith Burston; Darryl Littlejohn; Eric Douglas	Mark Davis	3:58
4.	"I'm Gonna Be a Wheel Someday" (Los Lobos)	Dave Bartholomew; Roy Hayes; Antoine Domino	Los Lobos	2:03
5.	"Stan & Ollie" (Henry Mancini; instrumental)	H. Mancini	H. Mancini	2:39
Total length:				31:45
