= The Larry Storch Show =

American TV comic variety series (1953)

- Starring: Larry Storch
- Country of origin: United States
- Original language: English

Production
- Running time: 60 minutes

Original release
- Network: CBS

The Larry Storch Show is an American comic variety show that aired live on CBS from July 11, 1953, to September 12, 1953. The series was the summer replacement for The Jackie Gleason Show.

== Summary ==
Larry Storch and his guests were featured in comedy sketches. Among the characters Storch played from his club act were 10-year-old Victor, TV cowboy Smillie Higgins, and Railroad Jack. Ray Bloch and his orchestra supplied music for the show.

== Production ==
Al Span was the producer, and Frank Satenstein was the director. The writers were Leo Solomon, Phil Sharp, Will Glickman, and Joe Stein. The show was broadcast on Saturdays from 8 to 9 p.m. Eastern Time. The sponsors were Purex, Sheaffer Pens, and Nescafe.

== Critical response ==
A review in the trade publication Variety found flaws in the premiere episode. Storch, it said, failed to demonstrate "any distinctive virtures beyond that of a mimic". It added that Storch's performance never rose above the "assorted and, for the most part, ill-fitting lines and situations" found in the script. The review acknowledged Storch's talent for mimicry, but indicated that it was offset by shortcomings such as one "painfully tedious, slowmoving sketch". It also noted that the show ran "a full six minutes short, thus creating an embarrassing stage wall at the finale".

Life magazine said that Storch "put into his first show his last bit of sweat and energy. The result: a few laughs, a lot of headaches, and pretty good prospects for the future." It quoted Storch as saying "I was put into the wrong situations", and the magazine noted, "CBS began to redraft the show."

Leo Mishkin wrote in The Philadelphia Inquirer, "The trouble with the new Larry Storch Show, as it is called, lies not in Storch himself, but in the material which he has been called upon to play." Mishkin went on to point out elements of the program that made it "too plainly an imitation of too many other programs along the same line." As a result, he said, the show was "neither good, bad, nor indifferent".
