= S.O.B. (film) =

1981 American comedy directed by Blake Edwards

- Theatrical release poster by John Alvin
- Directed by: Blake Edwards
- Written by: Blake Edwards
- Produced by: Blake Edwards; Tony Adams
- Starring: Julie Andrews; William Holden; Richard Mulligan; Robert Preston; Larry Hagman; Robert Vaughn; Robert Webber; Stuart Margolin; Shelley Winters; Marisa Berenson; Loretta Swit
- Cinematography: Harry Stradling Jr.
- Edited by: Ralph E. Winters
- Music by: Henry Mancini
- Production company: Lorimar Productions
- Distributed by: Paramount Pictures
- Release date: July 1, 1981
- Running time: 121 minutes
- Country: United States
- Language: English
- Budget: $12 million
- Box office: $14.8 million

S.O.B. is a 1981 American satirical black comedy film written and directed by Blake Edwards, starring Julie Andrews, Richard Mulligan, Robert Preston, Larry Hagman, Robert Vaughn, Robert Webber, Loretta Swit, Shelley Winters, and William Holden in his final film role. The film was produced by Lorimar and was released by Paramount Pictures on July 1, 1981.

== Plot ==
The satirical plot follows film industry denizens and Hollywood society, all preoccupied with making a movie. After an elaborate song-and-dance sequence set to "Polly Wolly Doodle", it's revealed successful film producer Felix Farmer has just suffered the first major flop of his career with his film Night Wind, resulting in the loss of millions of dollars to Capitol film studios. The failure of the film has also cost Felix his sanity and his marriage to actress Sally Miles.

Felix attempts suicide several times but each one is a failure. After he tries to hang himself in an upstairs bedroom, he falls and crashes through the floor, injuring a Hollywood gossip columnist standing in the room below. While Felix is variously catatonic or heavily sedated, his three closest friends, film director Tim Culley, press agent Ben Coogan and physician Dr. Irving Finegarten, occupy his Malibu beach house and host a party, which soon degenerates into an orgy. Felix then tries to asphyxiate himself in his kitchen oven but he is again thwarted by two randy party guests with other things on their mind. Felix next attempts to shoot himself, but is distracted by a young woman wearing only a pair of panties. This experience gives Felix a sudden, intense epiphany: His film's failure was due to its lack of sex.

Thoroughly convinced that an erotic version of Night Wind will be a resounding success, Felix persuades David Blackman, the president of Capitol studios to sell him the film outright. Initially, Blackman and the other studio bigwigs are keen to unload the film on Felix and recoup their investment. Unbeknownst to his estranged wife, Sally, the star of the failed Night Wind, Felix liquidates most of their assets to purchase the film and finance further production. He then attempts to convince Sally, an Oscar-winning actress with a squeaky-clean image, to perform in the revised film—now a softcore pornographic musical where she would appear topless. The Capitol executives believe Felix is insane but when Sally's agent convinces her to go through with the topless scene and the Hollywood buzz believes that a revised, erotic Night Wind starring a topless Sally Miles will be a likely success, they plot to regain control of the film. Since half of Felix's assets legally belong to Sally, she is persuaded by Herb Maskowitz, her attorney (whose law firm also represents Capitol studios) to sign a deal with the studio to distribute Night Wind; a deal that also gives Capitol the right to edit the film. When Felix learns of Sally's distribution deal, he becomes hysterical and attempts to steal the film negatives from Capitol studio's color lab vault. After brandishing his son's water pistol and taking the lab's manager hostage, Felix is shot and killed by the police.

Felix's three comrades, Culley, Ben and Dr. Finegarten, are hit hard by his sudden and tragic death. They decide to save Felix from a lavish but hypocritical Hollywood funeral and give their old friend a proper sendoff. The inebriated trio break into the funeral home, steal Felix's body from its casket and substitute the corpse of a largely forgotten character actor who died unnoticed on the beach near the Farmer home at the beginning of the film. After toasting their fallen comrade, the three give Felix a Viking funeral in a burning dinghy, while the actor in Felix's casket gets the elaborate Hollywood sendoff on a soundstage at Capitol studios. The epilogue reveals that Felix was right: His revamped Night Wind was a box-office bonanza for the studio, with Sally winning another Academy Award for her performance.

== Cast ==
- Julie Andrews as Sally Miles, the star of Night Wind and the wife of film producer Felix Farmer
- William Holden as Tim Culley, the director of Night Wind and Felix's best friend
- Richard Mulligan as Felix Farmer, the producer of Night Wind and Sally's husband
- Robert Preston as Dr. Irving Finegarten, Felix and Sally's physician
- Robert Webber as Ben Coogan, Sally's press agent
- Robert Vaughn as David Blackman, the president of Capitol Studios
- Larry Hagman as Dick Benson, a Capitol studios executive and Blackman's right-hand man
- Marisa Berenson as Mavis, an actress and Blackman's mistress
- Stuart Margolin as Gary Murdock, Sally's personal secretary and an aspiring producer
- Loretta Swit as Polly Reed, a Hollywood gossip columnist
- Craig Stevens as Willard Pratt, Polly's henpecked husband
- Shelley Winters as Eva Brown, Sally's agent
- Robert Loggia as Herb Maskowitz, Sally's lawyer
- Jennifer Edwards as Lila, a young hitchhiker picked up by Culley
- Rosanna Arquette as Babs, Lila's friend, also picked up by Culley
- John Lawlor as the Capitol Studios Manager
- John Pleshette as the Capitol Studios Vice-president
- Ken Swofford as Harold P. Harrigan, a studio security guard
- Hamilton Camp as Lipschitz, an executive at Capitol Color Lab, where the negative of Night Wind is stored.
- Paul Stewart as Harry Sandler, Felix's agent
- Benson Fong as Felix and Sally's excitable personal chef
- Larry Storch as Professor Krishna Mansa Kesari, Sally Miles' spiritual guru, who officiates at Felix's funeral.
- Mimi Davis as Joyce Benson, Dick's wife and Sandler's daughter
- David Young as Sam Marshall, a popular young actor
- Byron Kane as the Funeral Director
- Virginia Gregg as the Funeral Director's Wife
- Herb Tanney as Burgess Webster (as Stiffe Tanney)
- Joe Penny as Officer Buchwald, a police officer called to the Farmer residence
- Erica Yohn as Agnes, the costume designer of Night Wind
- Colleen Brennan as Tammy Taylor (as Katherine MacMurray)
- Charles Lampkin as Felix and Sally's Butler
- Bert Rosario as the Mexican Gardener
- Gene Nelson as Clive Lytell

== Title ==
"S.O.B." (in the film) stands for "Standard Operational Bullshit" and is uttered in the film by Robert Webber as Ben Coogan. The abbreviation usually means "sexually oriented business" (if pertaining to strip clubs) and more generally "son of a bitch" (a ruthless person).

A Spanish dub of the film keeps the abbreviation S.O.B., claiming that it stands for "Sois honrados Bandidos" (You Are Honest Crooks). The Argentine title for the movie was changed to Se acabó el mundo (The World is Ended), having no relation to the original title.

Three years later, when Blake Edwards had his name removed from the writing credits of 1984's City Heat, he was billed under the pseudonym Sam O. Brown. (S.O.B.)

== Influences ==
When writing the screenplay, Edwards drew upon several of his own experiences as a filmmaker. The character of Felix Farmer is not unlike Edwards, while actress Sally Miles bears certain similarities to real-life wife Julie Andrews (who plays her).

The story of S.O.B. parallels the experiences of Edwards and Andrews when making the film Darling Lili. Intended to reveal Andrews' heretofore unseen wicked and sexy side, that film had a troubled shoot, went significantly over budget, and was subjected to postproduction studio interference from Paramount Pictures. The early 1970s brought more bad news for Edwards; he made two films for Metro-Goldwyn-Mayer, Wild Rovers, a western with William Holden and Ryan O'Neal and The Carey Treatment with James Coburn. Once again, studio interference occurred during postproduction of both films, which were edited without any input from Edwards. Both movies opened to negative reviews and poor business. Hit hard financially and personally by these events, Edwards moved to Europe to work independently, away from the meddling and restrictions of the Hollywood studios. The plan worked, leading to several successful projects, including three profitable The Pink Panther sequels starring Peter Sellers.

In S.O.B., Andrews's character Sally agrees to "show my boobies" in a scene in the film-within-the-film. For this scene, comedian Johnny Carson thanked Andrews at the 54th Academy Awards for "showing us that the hills were still alive," alluding to a famous line from The Sound of Music opening sequence and its title song.

== Production ==
Edwards began development of S.O.B. in 1976. In 1979, the film was set for preproduction at Orion Pictures with distribution by Warner Bros., Edwards's third film with Orion after 10 and The Ferret, which was due to star Dudley Moore. In July 1979, Orion put the film into turnaround. Later that year, Edwards signed a deal with Lorimar through United Artists set to distribute. In January 1980, Variety announced that Cloris Leachman and David Callan had been named among the cast members, but neither ultimately appeared in the film; Variety also reported that Joel Grey had turned down a role in S.O.B. In 1981, Lorimar's distribution agreement with UA ended and Lorimar began distributing their films through Paramount Pictures. Paramount released S.O.B. in July, 1981, though much animosity still existed between Edwards and Paramount over the Darling Lili debacle.

Filming of S.O.B. took place between March and July 1980 in Los Angeles, Malibu, and Santa Monica on a budget of $12 million.

== Reception ==
=== Critical response ===
S.O.B. was released in July 1981, with critical opinion of the film sharply divided. Remarkably, the screenplay was nominated for both a Writers Guild of America Award for Best Comedy Written Directly for the Screen at the 34th Writers Guild of America Awards, and a Razzie Award for Worst Screenplay at the 2nd Golden Raspberry Awards. It was also nominated for a Razzie for Worst Director and a Golden Globe Award for Best Motion Picture – Comedy/Musical at the 39th Golden Globe Awards.

S.O.B. currently holds an 82% approval rating on Rotten Tomatoes from 28 reviews. The website's critical consensus reads, "A sustained blast of unbridled vitriol from writer-director Blake Edwards, S.O.B. is one of the blackest – and most consistently funny – Hollywood satires ever put to film."

Vincent Canby, writing for The New York Times, described S.O.B. as "a nasty, biased, self-serving movie that also happens to be hilarious most of the time...It's difficult to remember a film as mean-spirited as S.O.B. that also was so consistently funny." Gene Siskel and Roger Ebert, then hosts of the PBS movie review program Sneak Previews, both gave S.O.B. a positive review.

=== Box office ===
The film grossed $3,116,078 over the five-day 4th of July holiday weekend and went on to gross $14.8 million in the United States and Canada. The Village Voice dubbed the film a box-office flop.

== Television version ==
Broadcast television prints of S.O.B. contain alternate takes and edits of several scenes originally containing sex and nudity, such as the party and orgy scenes and Night Wind's erotica dream sequence where Julie Andrews exposes her breasts. The television version contains a scene where Robert Vaughn, as studio head David Blackman, receives a phone call while in bed with his mistress Mavis (Marisa Berenson), and is simply seen naked from the waist up. In the original theatrical print, he is wearing a bustier and nylon stockings.

== Home media ==
The original video release was made by CBS Video Enterprises in 1982, on both VHS and CED Videodisc, and was later reissued on VHS by CBS/Fox Video in the mid-1980s. Warner Bros. bought ancillary rights in 1989 with their purchase of Lorimar, and the film was released on LaserDisc through Warner Home Video in 1990. Warner released a DVD edition in 2002 and reissued in 2012. In 2017, Warner Archive released the film on Blu-ray.
