= William Luhr =

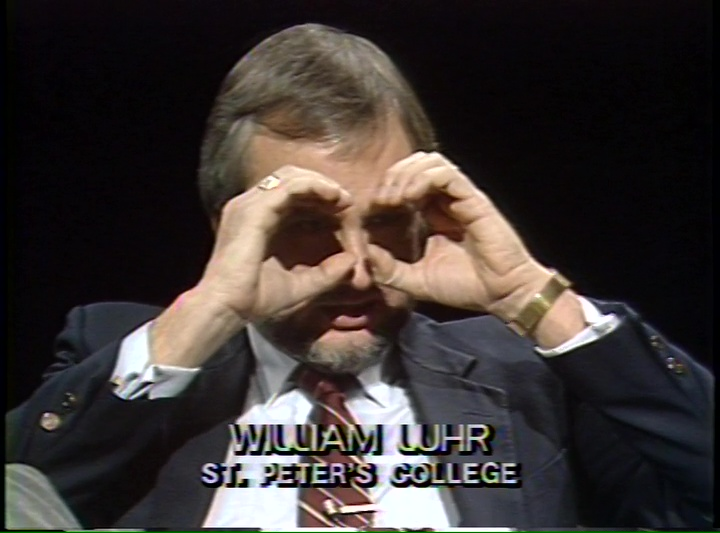
Luhr on CUNY TV's Cinema Then, Cinema Now (1986)

William Luhr is an American film author and professor and the author of such works as Thinking About Movies: Watching, Questioning, Enjoying, World Cinema Since 1945: An Encyclopedic History and Returning to the Scene. He is also currently a professor of English at Saint Peter's University in Jersey City, New Jersey.

== Selected publications ==
- Authorship and Narrative in the Cinema: Issues in Contemporary Aesthetics and Criticism (with Peter Lehman, 1977)
- Blake Edwards (with Peter Lehman, 1981)
- Raymond Chandler and Film (1982)
- World Cinema Since 1945: An Encyclopedic History (1987)
- Returning to the Scene: Blake Edwards, Volume 2 (with Peter Lehman, 1989)
