= Blind Date (1987 film) =

1987 film by Blake Edwards

- Theatrical release poster
- Directed by: Blake Edwards
- Written by: Dale Launer
- Produced by: Tony Adams
- Starring: Kim Basinger; Bruce Willis; John Larroquette; William Daniels
- Cinematography: Harry Stradling Jr.
- Edited by: Robert Pergament
- Music by: Henry Mancini
- Production company: Delphi Productions
- Distributed by: Tri-Star Pictures
- Release date: March 27, 1987
- Running time: 95 minutes
- Country: United States
- Language: English
- Budget: $16 million
- Box office: $39.3 million

Blind Date is a 1987 American romantic comedy film directed by Blake Edwards and written by Dale Launer. The film stars Bruce Willis, in his first credited leading film role, alongside Kim Basinger, John Larroquette, and William Daniels. It follows workaholic Walter Davis (Willis), whose promising blind date with Nadia Gates (Basinger) descends into a series of increasingly chaotic misadventures after she begins drinking alcohol, provoking the attention of her obsessive former boyfriend.

Originally developed as a vehicle for Madonna and Sean Penn, the project was recast after Edwards joined as director and requested revisions to the screenplay. Principal photography took place between May and July 1986 in Los Angeles, Santa Monica, and Culver City. The film's score was composed by Henry Mancini.

Released by Tri-Star Pictures on March 27, 1987, Blind Date opened at number one at the North American box office and grossed $39.3 million against a $16 million budget. Critical reception was negative, with reviewers generally praising individual comic set pieces while criticizing the film's characterization and uneven execution.

== Plot ==
Workaholic Walter Davis is under pressure to secure a deal for his employer to manage the vast assets of Japanese industrialist Yakamoto. Urgently needing a date for the dinner celebrating the deal, Walter's brother Ted offers him a blind date with his wife Susie's cousin Nadia. Ted and Susie warn Walter not to let Nadia drink alcohol as she loses control.

Walter meets Nadia, finding her beautiful, sweet, and charming, but her obsessive and jealous ex-boyfriend David attacks Walter. After evading David, Walter takes Nadia to a recording studio to listen to his friend, and reveals to Nadia that he gave up his dream of being a musician for the security of a steady job. Despite the earlier warnings, he gives a reluctant Nadia some champagne.

At the dinner with Yakamoto, Nadia quickly loses her inhibitions and acts impulsively, calling out Walter's colleague for attempting to seduce her, mocking a waiter for his condescending attitude, and inadvertently spraying Walter's boss with champagne. Her actions draw the ire of Yakamoto who expects women to be quiet and subservient. After Nadia convinces Yakamoto's meek wife to divorce him and take half his assets, the deal collapses and Walter is fired.

Walter tries to return Nadia home, but they are repeatedly intercepted by David in vain attempts to reunite with Nadia. Upset, Nadia runs off to a disco, followed by Walter, and the pair reconcile while dancing. David arrives and instigates a bar brawl, during which Walter and Nadia escape. She suggests going to a friend's party but Walter insists on taking her home. When Walter arrives at the address Nadia provided, a truck tows the house away, his car is stripped of parts while he is distracted, and muggers accost him, hiding a gun in his car before fleeing as the police arrive.

Nadia sobers up and expresses regret for her actions before Walter is forced to ram the pursuing David's car off the road. Manic from the night's events, Walter insists on taking Nadia to her friend's party, where he embarrasses her with his dishevelled appearance and erratic behaviour. David arrives and fights Walter until the latter finds the gun. He threatens David, but the police arrive and arrest the bloody and bruised Walter.

The following morning, Nadia bails Walter out of jail. Walter tells Nadia that he never wants to see her again, but Nadia reminds Walter that he gave her alcohol despite being warned. She laments that she thought he was someone with whom she could fall in love, having initially found him sweet and generous. Feeling remorseful and with Walter facing years of imprisonment, Nadia asks David, a defense lawyer, to represent him. David accepts in exchange for Nadia agreeing to marry him, to her disgust. David's father, Judge Harold Bedford, despises his son, and agrees to declare Walter innocent if David relocates his life as far away as possible. Susie gives Walter a note from Nadia in which she says she will miss him and asks that he start playing the guitar again.

As the wedding day approaches, Walter injects a box of chocolates with brandy and sends them to Nadia at David's parents's mansion, where the event will take place. Nadia unwittingly eats the chocolates, becomes inebriated, and disrupts the wedding, refusing to marry David because she is in love with someone else. Walter arrives and kisses Nadia, to the attendees's joy and David's ire.

Sometime later, Walter and Nadia honeymoon on a beach. He plays the guitar for her while a celebratory bottle of Coca-Cola chills in a champagne bucket.

== Cast ==
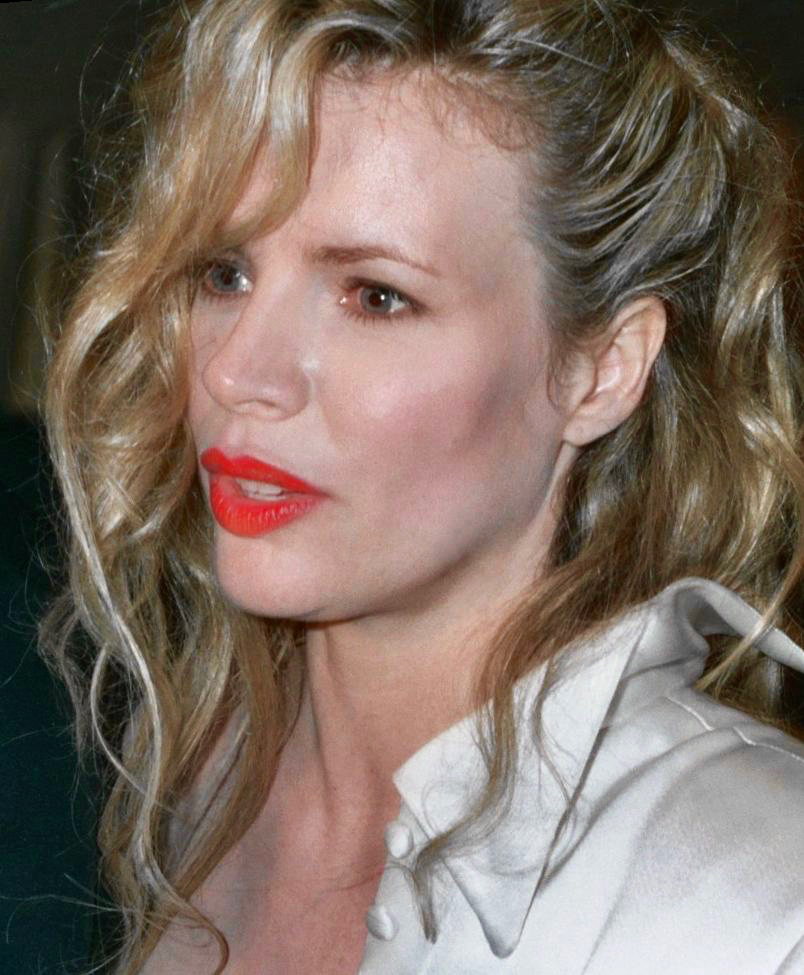
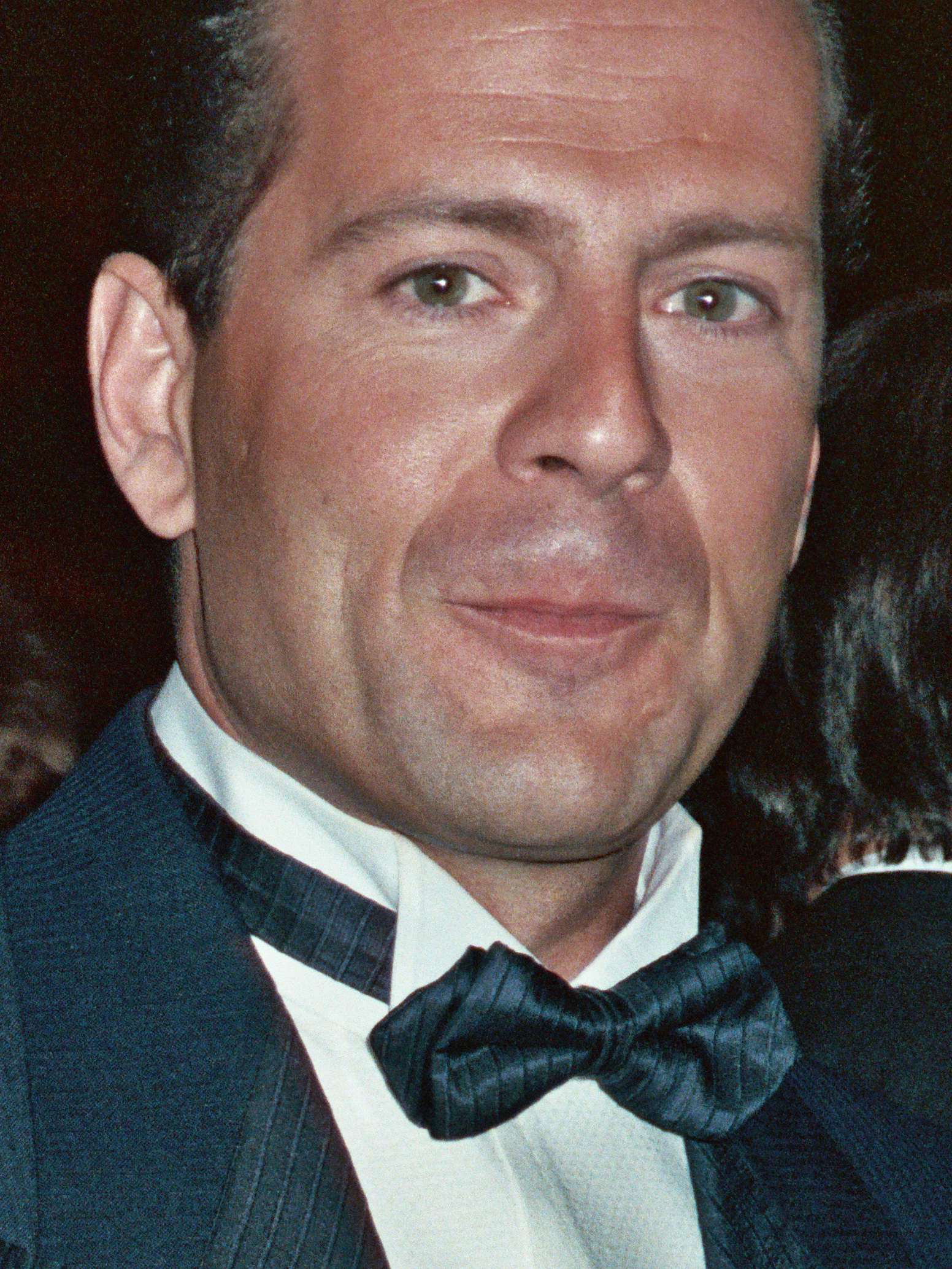
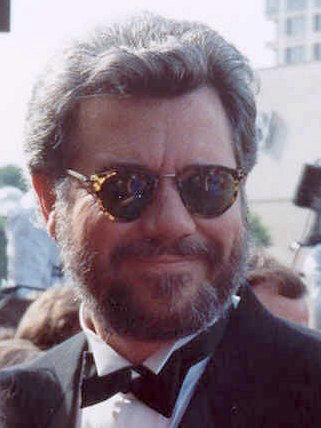
Kim Basinger (pictured in 1990), Bruce Willis (1989), and John Larroquette (1988)
- Kim Basinger as Nadia Gates
- Bruce Willis as Walter Davis
- John Larroquette as David Bedford
- William Daniels as Judge Harold Bedford
- George Coe as Harry Gruen
- Mark Blum as Denny Gordon
- Phil Hartman as Ted Davis
- Stephanie Faracy as Susie Davis

Blind Date also features Alice Hirson as Muriel Bedford, Stanley Jordan as Himself, Graham Stark as Jordan, Joyce Van Patten as Mrs. Gates, Barry Sobel as Gas Station Attendant, Armin Shimerman as French Waiter, Brian George as Maitre d', Dick Durock as Bouncer, and Sab Shimono as Mr. Yakamoto.

== Production ==
The film was originally intended for the recently married Madonna and Sean Penn, but both backed out after the project failed to attract a director. The project moved from HandMade Films to Blake Edwards, who agreed to direct contingent on script changes. The studio agreed and the movie was re-cast with Bruce Willis and Kim Basinger. Filming took place between May 5 and July 14, 1986 in Los Angeles, Santa Monica and Culver City.

Billy Vera & The Beaters appear in the bar scene, playing several songs.

== Reception ==
=== Box office ===
Blind Date was released in the United States and Canada on March 27, 1987. During its opening weekend it grossed a total of $7.5 million from 1,251 theaters—an average of $6,020 per theater—making it the highest grossing film of the weekend, ahead of Lethal Weapon ($5 million), in its 4th weekend of release, and Platoon ($3.9 million), in its fifteenth. In its second weekend, Blind Date fell to the number 2 position with a $5.7 million gross, placing it behind the debuting Police Academy 4: Citizens on Patrol ($8.5 million) and ahead of Platoon ($4.7 million). It fell to the number 3 position in its third weekend with a $4.1 million gross, behind Police Academy 4: Citizens on Patrol ($4.5 million) and the debuting The Secret of My Success ($7.8 million). Blind Date left the top-ten highest-grossing films after ten weeks.

In total, Blind Date grossed $39.3 million, making it the 23rd-highest-grossing film of 1987 in the US and Canada.

=== Critical response ===
On the review aggregator website Rotten Tomatoes, the film has an approval rating of 27%, based on 26 reviews. The website's consensus reads, "Blind Date has all the ingredients for a successful madcap comedy, but the end results suggest director Blake Edwards has lost his once-reliable touch." On Metacritic, the film has a weighted average score of 49 out of 100, based on 14 critics, indicating "mixed or average" reviews. Audiences polled by CinemaScore gave the film an average grade of "B" on an A+ to F scale.

Roger Ebert of the Chicago Sun-Times gave the film two and a half stars out of four and wrote: "There are individual moments in this movie that are as funny as anything Edwards has ever done, but they're mostly sight gags and don't grow out of the characters. The characters, alas, are the problem." Ebert thought that Willis played his nebbishy character too successfully (to the point of being dull), and Basinger's haircut obscured her eyes and face. "Most of the time I wasn't laughing. But when I was laughing, I was genuinely laughing - there are some absolutely inspired moments." Variety calls it "essentially a running string of gags with snippets of catchy dialog in-between".

== Soundtrack ==
The soundtrack to the motion picture was released by Rhino Records in 1987.

Track listing

1. "Simply Meant to Be" - Gary Morris & Jennifer Warnes
2. "Let You Get Away" - Billy Vera & The Beaters
3. "Oh, What a Nite" - Billy Vera & The Beaters
4. "Anybody Seen Her?" - Billy Vera & The Beaters
5. "Talked About Lover" - Keith L'Neire
6. "Crash, Bang, Boom" - Hubert Tubbs
7. "Something for Nash" - Henry Mancini
8. "Treasures" - Stanley Jordan
9. "Simply Meant to Be" (Instrumental) - Henry Mancini
