= Blake Edwards =

American filmmaker (1922–2010)

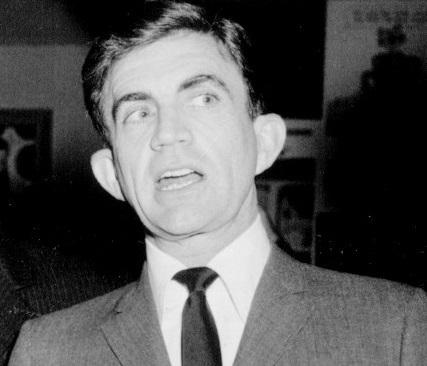
- Edwards in 1966
- Born: William Blake Crump; July 26, 1922; Tulsa, Oklahoma, U.S.
- Died: December 15, 2010 (aged 88); Santa Monica, California, U.S.
- Occupations: Director; screenwriter; producer; actor
- Years active: 1942–2008
- Spouses: Patricia Walker (m. 1953; div. 1967); Julie Andrews (m. 1969)
- Children: 4, including Jennifer

Blake Edwards (born William Blake Crump; July 26, 1922 – December 15, 2010) was an American film director, producer, and screenwriter. Often thought of as primarily a director of comedies, he also directed several drama, musical, and detective films. Late in his career, he took up writing, producing and directing for theater. He received an Honorary Academy Award in recognition of his writing, directing and producing an extraordinary body of work for the screen.

Born in Tulsa, Oklahoma, Edwards began his career in the 1940s as an actor, but he soon began writing screenplays and radio scripts before turning to producing and directing in television and films. His best-known films include Breakfast at Tiffany's (1961), Days of Wine and Roses (1962), A Shot in the Dark (1964), The Great Race (1965), 10 (1979), Victor/Victoria (1982), Blind Date (1987), and the hugely successful Pink Panther film series with British actor Peter Sellers.

== Early life and education ==
Born William Blake Crump July 26, 1922, in Tulsa, Oklahoma, he was the son of Donald and Lillian (née Grommett) Crump (1897–1992). In an interview with André Previn, Blake Edwards claimed to be a descendant of William Blake. His father reportedly left the family before he was born. His mother married again, to Jack McEdward, who became his stepfather. McEdward was the son of J. Gordon Edwards, a director of silent movies, and in 1925, he moved the family to Los Angeles and became a film production manager. In an interview with The Village Voice in 1971, Blake Edwards said that he had "always felt alienated, estranged from my own father, Jack McEdward". After graduating from Beverly Hills High School in the class of Winter 1941, Blake began taking jobs as an actor during World War II.

Edwards describes this period:

I worked with the best directors – Ford, Wyler, Preminger – and learned a lot from them. But I wasn't a very cooperative actor. I was a spunky, smart-assed kid. Maybe even I was indicating that I wanted to give, not take, direction.

Edwards served in the United States Coast Guard during World War II, where he suffered a severe back injury, which left him in pain for years afterwards.

== Career ==
Edwards's debut as a director came in 1952 on the television program Four Star Playhouse.

In the 1954–1955 television season, Edwards joined with Richard Quine to create Mickey Rooney's first television series, The Mickey Rooney Show: Hey, Mulligan. Edwards's hard-boiled private detective scripts for Richard Diamond, Private Detective became NBC's answer to Sam Spade and Philip Marlowe, reflecting Edwards's unique humor. Edwards also created, wrote, and directed the 1958–61 TV detective series Peter Gunn, which starred Craig Stevens, with music by Henry Mancini. The following year, Edwards produced Mr. Lucky, an adventure series on CBS starring John Vivyan and Ross Martin. Mancini's association with Edwards continued in his film work, significantly contributing to their success.

Edwards's most popular films were comedies, the melodrama Days of Wine and Roses being a notable exception. His most dynamic and successful collaboration was with Peter Sellers in six of the movies in the Pink Panther series. Edwards later directed the comedy film 10 with Dudley Moore and Bo Derek.

=== Operation Petticoat (1959) ===
Operation Petticoat was Edwards's first big-budget movie as a director. The film, which starred Cary Grant and Tony Curtis and was produced by Grant's own production company, Granart Company, became the "greatest box-office success of the decade for Universal [Studios]" and made Edwards a recognized director.

=== Breakfast at Tiffany's (1961) ===
Breakfast at Tiffany's, based on the novella by Truman Capote, is credited with establishing him as a "cult figure" with many critics. Andrew Sarris called it the "directorial surprise of 1961", and it became a "romantic touchstone" for college students in the early 1960s.

=== Days of Wine and Roses (1962) ===
Days of Wine And Roses, a dark psychological film about the effects of alcoholism on a previously happy marriage, starred Jack Lemmon and Lee Remick. It has been described as "perhaps the most unsparing tract against drink that Hollywood has yet produced, more pessimistic than Billy Wilder's The Lost Weekend". The film gave another major boost to Edwards's reputation as an important director.

=== Darling Lili (1970) ===
According to critic George Morris, Darling Lili "synthesizes every major Edwards theme: the disappearance of gallantry and honor, the tension between appearances and reality and the emotional, spiritual, moral, and psychological disorder" in such a world. Edwards used complex cinematography techniques, including long-shot zooms, tracking, and focus distortion, to great effect. However, the film failed badly with most critics and at the box office. Despite a cost of $17 million to make, it was seen by few cinema-goers, and the few who did watch were unimpressed. It brought Paramount Pictures to "the verge of financial collapse", and became an example of "self-indulgent extravagance" in filmmaking "that was ruining Hollywood".

Darling Lili star Julie Andrews had married Edwards in 1969.

=== Pink Panther film series ===
Edwards also directed most of the comedy film series The Pink Panther, the majority of installments starring Peter Sellers as the inept Inspector Clouseau. The relationship between the director and the lead actor was considered a fruitful yet complicated one with many disagreements during production. At various times in their film relationship, "he more than once swore off Sellers" as too hard to direct. However, in his later years, he admitted that working with Sellers was often irresistible:

"We clicked on comedy and we were lucky we found each other because we both had so much respect for it. We also had an ability to come up with funny things and great situations that had to be explored. But in that exploration there would often times be disagreement. But I couldn't resist those moments when we jelled. And if you ask me who contributed most to those things, it couldn't have happened unless both of us were involved, even though it wasn't always happy."

Five of those films involved Edwards and Sellers in original material; those films being The Pink Panther (1963), A Shot in the Dark (1964), The Return of the Pink Panther (1975), The Pink Panther Strikes Again (1976), and Revenge of the Pink Panther (1978). (1968's Inspector Clouseau, the third film in the series, was made without the involvement of Edwards or Sellers.) The films were all highly profitable: The Return of the Pink Panther, for example, cost just $2.5 million to make but grossed $100 million, while The Pink Panther Strikes Again did even better.

After Sellers's death in 1980, Edwards directed three further Pink Panther films. Trail of the Pink Panther (1982) consisted of unused material of Sellers from The Pink Panther Strikes Again as well as previously seen material from the earlier films. Curse of the Pink Panther (1983) and Son of the Pink Panther (1993) were further attempts by Edwards to continue the series without Sellers but both films were critical and financial disappointments. Edwards eventually retired from film making two years after the release of Son of the Pink Panther.

== Silent-film style ==
Having grown up in Hollywood, the stepson of a studio production manager and stepgrandson of a silent-film director, Edwards had watched the films of the great silent-era comedians, including Charlie Chaplin, Buster Keaton, Harold Lloyd, and Laurel and Hardy. He and Sellers appreciated and understood the comedy styles in silent films and tried to recreate them in their work together. After their immense success with the first two Pink Panther films, The Pink Panther (1963) and A Shot in the Dark (1964), which adapted many silent-film aspects, including slapstick, they attempted to go even further in The Party (1968). The film has always had a cult following, and some critics and fans have considered it a "masterpiece in this vein" of silent comedy, though it did include minimal dialogue.

== Personal life ==
=== Marriages ===
Edwards married his first wife, actress Patricia Walker, in 1953; they divorced in 1967. Edwards and Walker had two children, including Jennifer Edwards. Walker appeared in the comedy All Ashore (1953), for which Edwards was one of the screenwriters. Edwards also named one of his film production companies, Patricia Productions, Incorporated, after her.

Edwards's second marriage, from 1969 until his death in 2010, was to Julie Andrews. They were married for 41 years. He was the stepfather to Emma, from Andrews's previous marriage. In the 1970s, Edwards and Andrews adopted two Vietnamese girls.

=== Health ===
Edwards described his struggle for 15 years with the illness myalgic encephalomyelitis/chronic fatigue syndrome (ME/CFS) in the documentary I Remember Me (2000).

== Death and legacy ==
On December 15, 2010, Edwards died at the Saint John's Health Center in Santa Monica, California from complications of pneumonia. He was 88.

Edwards was greatly admired, and criticized, as a filmmaker. His critics are alluded to by American film author George Morris:

It has been difficult for many critics to accept Blake Edwards as anything more than a popular entertainer. Edwards' detractors acknowledge his formal skill, but deplore the absence of profundity in his movies. Edwards' movies are slick and glossy, but their shiny surfaces reflect all too accurately the disposable values of contemporary life.

Others, however, recognized him more for his significant achievements at different periods of his career. British film critic Peter Lloyd, for example, described Edwards, in 1971, as "the finest director working in the American commercial cinema at the present time". Edwards's biographers, William Luhr and Peter Lehman, in an interview in 1974, called him "the finest American director working at this time". They refer especially to the Pink Panther's Clouseau, developed with the comedic skills of Peter Sellers as a character "perfectly consistent" with his "absurdist view of the world, because he has no faith in anything and constantly adapts". Critic Stuart Byron calls his first two Pink Panther films "two of the best comedies an American has ever made". Polls taken at the time showed that his name, as a director, was a rare "marketable commodity" in Hollywood.

Edwards himself described one of the secrets to success in the film industry:

For someone who wants to practice his art in this business, all you can hope to do, as S.O.B. says, is stick to your guns, make the compromises you must, and hope that somewhere along the way you acquire a few good friends who understand. And keep half a conscience.

== Filmography ==
=== Film ===
Year	Title	Director	Writer	Producer	Notes
1948	Panhandle	No	Yes	Yes	
1949	Stampede	No	Yes	Yes	
1952	Sound Off	No	Yes	No	
1952	Rainbow 'Round My Shoulder	No	Yes	No	
1953	All Ashore	No	Yes	No	
1953	Cruisin' Down the River	No	Yes	No	
1954	Drive a Crooked Road	No	Yes	No	
1954	The Atomic Kid	No	Yes	No	
1955	Bring Your Smile Along	Yes	Yes	No	
1955	My Sister Eileen	No	Yes	No	
1956	He Laughed Last	Yes	Yes	No	
1957	Mister Cory	Yes	Yes	No	
1957	Operation Mad Ball	No	Yes	No	
1958	This Happy Feeling	Yes	Yes	No	
1958	The Perfect Furlough	Yes	No	No	
1959	Operation Petticoat	Yes	No	No	
1960	High Time	Yes	Uncredited	Uncredited	
1961	Breakfast at Tiffany's	Yes	No	No	
1962	Experiment in Terror	Yes	No	Yes	
1962	Days of Wine and Roses	Yes	No	No	
1962	The Couch	No	Story	No	
1962	The Notorious Landlady	No	Yes	No	
1963	Soldier in the Rain	No	Yes	Yes	
1963	The Pink Panther	Yes	Yes	No	
1964	A Shot in the Dark	Yes	Yes	Yes	
1965	The Great Race	Yes	Story	Executive	
1966	What Did You Do in the War, Daddy?	Yes	Story	Yes	
1967	Gunn	Yes	Yes	Yes	
1967	Waterhole No. 3	No	No	Uncredited	
1968	The Party	Yes	Yes	Yes	
1970	Darling Lili	Yes	Yes	Yes	
1971	Wild Rovers	Yes	Yes	Yes	
1972	The Carey Treatment	Yes	No	No	
1972	Julie	Yes	No	No	Documentary film
1974	The Tamarind Seed	Yes	Yes	No	
1975	The Return of the Pink Panther	Yes	Yes	Yes	
1976	The Pink Panther Strikes Again	Yes	Yes	Yes	
1978	Revenge of the Pink Panther	Yes	Yes	Yes	
1979	10	Yes	Yes	Yes	
1981	S.O.B.	Yes	Yes	Yes	
1982	Victor/Victoria	Yes	Yes	Yes	
1982	Trail of the Pink Panther	Yes	Yes	Yes	
1983	Curse of the Pink Panther	Yes	Yes	Yes	
1983	The Man Who Loved Women	Yes	Yes	Yes	
1984	City Heat	No	Yes	No	
1984	Micki & Maude	Yes	No	No	
1986	A Fine Mess	Yes	Yes	No	
1986	That's Life!	Yes	Yes	No	
1987	Blind Date	Yes	Uncredited	No	
1988	Sunset	Yes	Yes	No	
1989	Skin Deep	Yes	Yes	No	
1991	Switch	Yes	Yes	No	
1993	Son of the Pink Panther	Yes	Yes	No	

=== Radio ===
Year	Title	Director	Writer	Creator
1948	Hollywood Star Theatre	No	Yes	No
1949–1953	Richard Diamond, Private Detective	Yes	Yes	Yes
1949–1962	Yours Truly, Johnny Dollar	No	Yes	No
1950–1952	The Lineup	No	Yes	No
1951	Broadway is My Beat	No	Yes	No
1951	Suspense	No	Yes	No

=== Television ===
Year	Title	Director	Writer	Producer	Creator	Notes
1952	Invitation Playhouse: Mind Over Murder	No	Yes	No	No	Episode "The Long Night"
1952–1954	Four Star Playhouse	Yes	Yes	No	No	Directed 5 episodes, wrote 9 episodes
1954	The Pepsi-Cola Playhouse	Yes	No	No	No	Episode "Death, The Hard Way"
1954	City Detective	Yes	No	No	No	Episode "Midnight Supper"
1954	The Lineup	No	Yes	No	No	Episode "Cop Killer"
1955	The Mickey Rooney Show	Yes	No	No	No	33 episodes
1955	The Star and the Story	Yes	No	No	No	Episode "Safe Journey"
1955	The Jane Wyman Show	Yes	Yes	No	No	Directed episode "Big Joe's Comin' Home"; Wrote episode "The Smuggler"
1956	Ford Television Theatre	No	Yes	No	No	Episode "The Payoff"
1957	Studio 57	Yes	Yes	No	No	Directed episode "Big Joe's Comin' Home"; Wrote episode "The Smuggler"
1957	Meet McGraw	No	Yes	No	No	Episode "Tycoon"
1957–1960	Richard Diamond, Private Detective	No	Yes	No	Yes	4 episodes
1958–1961	Peter Gunn	Yes	Yes	Yes	Yes	Directed 10 episodes; Wrote 11 episodes
1959–1960	Mr. Lucky	Yes	Yes	No	Yes	Wrote and directed episode "The Magnificent Bribe"
1960–1961	Dante	No	No	No	Yes	
1962	The Dick Powell Show	Yes	Story	No	No	Episode "The Boston Terrier"
1992	Julie	Yes	No	Executive	No	7 episodes

TV movies

Year	Title	Director	Writer	Executive Producer
1954	Mickey Spillane's Mike Hammer	Yes	Yes	No
1962	Johnny Dollar	Yes	Yes	Yes
1969	The Monk	No	Story	No
1984	The Ferret	No	Yes	Yes
1988	Justin Case	Yes	Yes	Yes
1989	Peter Gunn	Yes	Yes	Yes

=== Theater ===
Year	Title	Director	Writer	Executive Producer	Notes
1995–1999	Victor/Victoria	Yes	Yes	Yes	Broadway production and Broadway tour
1999	Big Rosemary	Yes	Yes	Yes	Off-Broadway production, 2004 theatrical workshop, 2008 Broadway preview
2003	Scapegoat	Yes	Yes	Yes	Theatrical workshop

== Awards and honors ==
Year	Association	Category	Nominated work	Result
1982	Academy Awards	Best Adapted Screenplay	Victor/Victoria	Nominated
2003	Academy Awards	Academy Honorary Award		Won
1962	Golden Globe Awards	Best Director	The Days of Wine and Roses	Nominated
1959	Primetime Emmy Awards	Outstanding Directing for a Drama Series	Peter Gunn	Nominated
1959	Primetime Emmy Awards	Outstanding Writing for a Drama Series	Peter Gunn	Nominated

In 2004, Edwards received an Honorary Academy Award for cumulative achievements over the course of his film career. As Entertainment Weekly reported, "Honorary Oscar winner Blake Edwards made an entrance worthy of Peter Sellers in one of Edwards' Pink Panther films: A stuntman who looked just like Edwards rode a speeding wheelchair past a podium and crashed through a wall. When the octogenarian director entered and dusted himself off as if he had crashed, he told presenter Jim Carrey, 'Don't touch my Oscar.'" Also in 2004, Edwards received The Life Career Award from the Academy of Science Fiction, Fantasy and Horror Films, during that year's Saturn Award ceremony.

In 1983, Edwards was nominated for an Academy Award for Best Screenplay for Victor/Victoria as well as winning Best Foreign Film and Best Foreign Screenplay in France and Italy, respectively for Victor/Victoria. In 1988, Edwards received the Creative Achievement Award from the American Comedy Awards. In 1991, Edwards received a star on the Hollywood Walk of Fame. In 1993, Edwards received the Preston Sturges Award jointly from the Directors Guild and the Writers Guild. In 2000, Edwards received the Contribution to Cinematic Imagery Award from the Art Directors Guild. In 2002, Edwards received the Laurel Award for Screenwriting Achievement from the Writers Guild as well as the Special Edgar from The Mystery Writers of America for career achievement.

Between 1962 and 1968, Edwards was nominated six times for a Golden Laurel Award as Best Director by Motion Picture Exhibitors. In 1963, Edwards was nominated for a Golden Globe as Best Director for Days of Wine and Roses. In 1962, Edwards was nominated for Outstanding Achievement by the Directors Guild for Breakfast at Tiffany's. In 1960, Edwards was nominated for an Edgar for Best Teleplay by the Mystery Writers of America for Peter Gunn. In 1959, Edwards was nominated for two Primetime Emmys as Best Director and Best Teleplay for Peter Gunn Between 1958 and 1983, Edwards was nominated eight times for Best Screenplay by the Writers Guild and won twice, for The Pink Panther Strikes Again and Victor/Victoria.

Accolades for Edwards' features
Year	Title	Academy Award		BAFTAs		Golden Globes	
Year	Title	Nominations	Wins	Nominations	Wins	Nominations	Wins
1958	The Perfect Furlough					2	1
1958	This Happy Feeling					1	1
1959	Operation Petticoat	1				2	
1960	High Time	1					
1961	Breakfast at Tiffany's	5	2			2	
1962	Experiment in Terror					1	
1962	Days of Wine and Roses	5	1	3		4	
1963	The Pink Panther	1		1		1	
1964	A Shot in the Dark			1			
1965	The Great Race	5	1			4	
1970	Darling Lili	3				3	1
1974	The Tamarind Seed			1			
1975	The Return of the Pink Panther					3	
1976	The Pink Panther Strikes Again	1				2	
1979	10	2				5	
1981	S.O.B.					1	
1982	Victor/Victoria	7	1			5	1
1984	Micki + Maude					2	1
1986	That's Life!					3	
1988	Sunset	1					
1991	Switch					1	
Total		32	5	6		42	5

Directed Academy Award performances
Under Edwards' direction, these actors have received Academy Award nominations for their performances in their respective roles.

Year	Performer	Film	Result
Academy Award for Best Actor
1962	Jack Lemmon	Days of Wine and Roses	Nominated
Academy Award for Best Actress
1961	Audrey Hepburn	Breakfast at Tiffany's	Nominated
1962	Lee Remick	Days of Wine and Roses	Nominated
1982	Julie Andrews	Victor/Victoria	Nominated
Academy Award for Best Supporting Actor
1982	Robert Preston	Victor/Victoria	Nominated
Academy Award for Best Supporting Actress
1982	Lesley Ann Warren	Victor/Victoria	Nominated

Awards and achievements
Preceded by Peter O'Toole	Academy Honorary Award; 2004	Succeeded by Sidney Lumet
