= Tony Adams (producer) =

Irish film and theater producer (1953–2005)

- Born: Anthony Patrick Adams; 15 February 1953; Dublin, Ireland
- Died: 22 October 2005 (aged 52); New York City, U.S.
- Occupations: Film and theater producer
- Spouses: Avril Adams (divorced) Debrah Farentino (m. 1992; div. 1994) Anne Runolfsson (m. 1997)
- Children: 4

Anthony Patrick Adams (15 February 1953 – 22 October 2005) was an Irish film and theatrical producer.

He produced numerous films for writer/director Blake Edwards, including six Pink Panther films and 10. He produced Victor/Victoria as a film and a Broadway musical. Off-Broadway, he produced The Immigrant and Minor Demons.

== Early life ==
Adams was born in Dublin. His father had opened one of the first cinemas in rural Ireland, in Derrinturn, in the 1940s. Tony Adams attended Derrinturn National school before moving at the age of 12 to Dún Laoghaire, County Dublin and attended CBS Eblana. Adams later co-founded and was chief reporter of the school's magazine, ARK.

== Career ==
Adams got his start in film business as director John Boorman's personal assistant on the film Deliverance. The picture's star, Burt Reynolds, heard that Adams wanted to stay in the U.S. and offered him a job on his Florida ranch. Reynolds also facilitated an introduction to Blake Edwards in California, where Adams attended Pepperdine University. Edwards and Adams worked together and remained friends from 1975 until Adams' death.

== Personal life and death ==
Adams was married three times and had four children. He lived on the Upper West Side of Manhattan.

On 22 October 2005, Adams died from a stroke at Mount Sinai Hospital in Manhattan, aged 52.

== Filmography ==
- The Return of the Pink Panther (1975; associate producer)
- The Pink Panther Strikes Again (1976)
- Revenge of the Pink Panther (1978)
- 10 (1979)
- S.O.B. (1981)
- Victor/Victoria (1982)
- Trail of the Pink Panther (1982)
- Curse of the Pink Panther (1983)
- The Man Who Loved Women (1983)
- Micki + Maude (1984)
- A Fine Mess (1986)
- That's Life! (1986)
- Blind Date (1987)
- Sunset (1988)
- Skin Deep (1989)
- Switch (1991)
- Son of the Pink Panther (1993)
