= List of Metro-Goldwyn-Mayer theatrical animated feature films =

This is a list of theatrical animated feature films produced, released, or owned by Metro-Goldwyn-Mayer.

== Films ==
Color legend
MGM Cartoons (1945–56)	
Toei Animation (1961-1982)	
MGM Animation/Visual Arts (1970)	
Metro-Goldwyn-Mayer Animation (1996)	
Third-party studio	
Live-action/animation hybrid sold as animation	^{S}
Live-action/animation hybrid sold as live-action	^{SL}
Adult animated production	^{A}
Distribution only	^{D}

=== American releases ===
Title	Original theatrical release date (Note: Listed are the original theatrical release dates in the United States (or other non-U.S. territories) when the film was contributed by MGM. Different distributors are attributed and credited for distributing each film throughout the history of MGM.)	Animation studio
Anchors Aweigh^{[SL]}	July 14, 1945 (Note: Released by Metro-Goldwyn-Mayer in North America) (Note: Owned by Warner Bros. Pictures (via Turner Entertainment Co.))	MGM Cartoons
Ziegfeld Follies^{[SL]}	August 13, 1945	MGM Cartoons
Holiday In Mexico^{[SL]}	August 15, 1946	MGM Cartoons
Dangerous When Wet^{[SL]}	July 3, 1953	MGM Cartoons
Invitation to the Dance^{[SL]}	May 15, 1956	MGM Cartoons
Magic Boy^{[D]}	June 22, 1961	Toei Animation
Alakazam the Great^{[D]}	July 26, 1961 (Note: Owned by Metro-Goldwyn-Mayer in North America)	Toei Animation
Yellow Submarine^{[D]}	November 13, 1968 (Note: Released by United Artists)	Apple Films and TVC London
The Phantom Tollbooth^{[S]}	November 7, 1970	MGM Animation/Visual Arts
The World of Hans Christian Andersen^{[D]}	March 1, 1971	Toei Animation
Fritz the Cat^{[A]}	April 12, 1972	Krantz Films
Heavy Traffic^{[S]}^{[A]}	August 8, 1973	Steve Krantz Productions
The Nine Lives of Fritz the Cat^{[A]}	June 26, 1974	Steve Krantz Productions
The Lord of the Rings	November 15, 1978 (Note: Owned by Warner Bros. Pictures)	Bakshi Productions and Fantasy Films
The Water Babies^{[S]}	June 15, 1979	Ariadne Films
Swan Lake	July 23, 1981	Toei Animation
The Secret of NIMH	July 2, 1982	Aurora Productions, Hollywood and Don Bluth Productions
Aladdin and the Wonderful Lamp	August 17, 1982	Toei Animation
Pink Floyd - The Wall^{[S]}^{[A]}	August 6, 1982	Tin Blue Productions
The Plague Dogs^{[A]}^{[D]}	October 21, 1982	Nepenthe Productions
Trail of the Pink Panther^{[SL]}	December 17, 1982	United Artists, Blake Edwards Entertainment and Titan Productions Inc.
Rock & Rule^{[A]}^{[D]}	April 15, 1983	Nelvana Limited
Curse of the Pink Panther^{[SL]}	August 12, 1983	Blake Edwards Entertainment and Titan Productions Inc.
The Care Bears Movie	March 29, 1985 (Note: Owned by Metro-Goldwyn-Mayer in all territories)	Nelvana Limited, American Greetings and Those Characters From Cleveland
The Adventures of the American Rabbit	February 14, 1986	Murakami-Wolf-Swenson Films Inc.
GoBots: Battle of the Rock Lords	March 21, 1986 (Note: Co-owned by Metro-Goldwyn-Mayer and Warner Bros. Pictures)	Hanna-Barbera Productions and Tonka Corporation
All Dogs Go to Heaven	November 17, 1989	Goldcrest Films and Sullivan Bluth Studios
Rock-a-Doodle^{[S]}^{[D]}	April 3, 1992	Goldcrest Films and Sullivan Bluth Studios
Son of the Pink Panther^{[SL]}	August 27, 1993	United Artists and Filmauro
Tank Girl^{[SL]}^{[A]}	March 31, 1995	Trilogy Entertainment Group
The Pebble and the Penguin	April 12, 1995	Sullivan Bluth Studios (Note: Co-produced with Metro-Goldwyn-Mayer in post-production after MGM's acquisition of the film.)
All Dogs Go to Heaven 2	March 29, 1996	Metro-Goldwyn-Mayer Animation
The Pink Panther^{[SL]}	February 10, 2006	Columbia Pictures and Robert Simonds Productions
Arthur and the Invisibles^{[S]}^{[D]}	January 12, 2007 (Note: Owned by Lionsgate)	EuropaCorp
Igor	September 19, 2008	Sparx Animation Studios
The Pink Panther 2^{[SL]}	February 6, 2009	Columbia Pictures and Robert Simonds Productions
Sherlock Gnomes	March 23, 2018 (Note: Co-owned by Paramount Pictures and Metro-Goldwyn-Mayer)	Paramount Animation and Rocket Pictures
Missing Link^{[D]}	April 12, 2019	Annapurna Pictures and Laika
The Addams Family	October 11, 2019	The Jackal Group and Cinesite Studios
The Addams Family 2	October 1, 2021	The Jackal Group and Cinesite Studios
Dark Harvest^{[SL]}^{[A]}	October 11, 2023	Matt Tolmach Productions
Look Back^{[A]}	October 4, 2024	Studio Durian, Avex Pictures, Shueisha and GKIDS
The Sheep Detectives^{[SL]}	May 8, 2026	Working Title Films, Lord Miller Productions and Three Strange Angels Productions

=== Upcoming ===
Title	Scheduled U.S. theatrical release	Animation studio
The Haunting of Hotel Transylvania^{[D]}	October 8, 2027 (Note: Internationally released by Amazon MGM Studios, released by Sony Pictures Releasing through Columbia Pictures in North America and most territories.)	Sony Pictures Animation
The Pink Panther^{[SL]}	TBA	Geoffrey Productions and Rideback
Wild Symphony	TBA	Weed Road Pictures
Thomas & Friends	TBA	Mattel Studios Escape Artists and 2DUX²
Bob the Builder	TBA	Mattel Studios, ShadowMachine and Nuyorican Productions
Teddy Ruxpin	TBA	Seven Bucks Productions and Story Kitchen
My Little Pony	TBA	Hasbro Entertainment
Untitled four Poltergeist Film	TBA	Ghost House Pictures
Untitled Monster School Film	TBA	Ghost House Pictures

== Highest grossing films ==
This list does not include films currently owned by MGM or combine live-action with animation.

Rank	Film	Worldwide gross	Studio	Year	Ref.
1	The Addams Family	$203,044,905	Cinesite Studios	2019	
2	The Addams Family 2	$119,815,153	Cinesite Studios	2021	
3	Arthur and the Invisibles	$107,944,236	EuropaCorp	2007	
4	Sherlock Gnomes	$90,345,871	Paramount Animation	2018	
5	Igor	$30,747,504	Sparx Animation Studios	2008	
6	All Dogs Go to Heaven	$27,100,027	Sullivan Bluth Studios	1989	
7	Missing Link	$15,702,484	Laika	2019	
8	The Secret of NIMH	$14,665,733	Don Bluth Productions	1982	
9	Look Back	$12,561,337	Studio Durian	2024	
10	All Dogs Go to Heaven 2	$8,620,678	Metro-Goldwyn-Mayer Animation	1996	

== See also ==
- List of Metro-Goldwyn-Mayer films

== Notes ==
Release Notes

Studio/Production Notes

Film rights Notes
