= The Pink Panther =

Comedy films and cartoons franchise

- Official franchise logo
- Created by: Blake Edwards; Maurice Richlin (original creators); David H. DePatie; Isadore "Friz" Freleng (animation)
- Original work: The Pink Panther (1963)
- Owner: Amazon MGM Studios
- Years: 1963–present

Films and television
- Films: Original series: The Pink Panther (1963); A Shot in the Dark (1964); Inspector Clouseau (1968); The Return of the Pink Panther (1975); The Pink Panther Strikes Again (1976); Revenge of the Pink Panther (1978); Trail of the Pink Panther (1982); Curse of the Pink Panther (1983); Son of the Pink Panther (1993); Reboot series: The Pink Panther (2006); The Pink Panther 2 (2009)
- Short films: See List of The Pink Panther cartoons and List of The Inspector cartoons
- Animated series: The Pink Panther Show (1969–1980); Pink Panther and Sons (1984–1985); The Pink Panther (1993–1995); Pink Panther and Pals (2010)
- Television specials: The Pink Panther in: A Pink Christmas (1978); The Pink Panther in: Olym-Pinks (1980); The Pink Panther in: Pink at First Sight (1981); The Pink Panther in: A Very Pink Christmas (2011)

Games
- Video games: Pink Panther (1988); Pink Goes to Hollywood (1993); The Pink Panther: Passport to Peril (1996); The Pink Panther: Hokus Pokus Pink (1997); Pink Panther: Pinkadelic Pursuit (2002)

Audio
- Original music: "The Pink Panther Theme" "Meglio stasera" "A Woman Like Me" "Check on It"

Official website
- Pink Panther on Metro-Goldwyn-Mayer

The Pink Panther is an American media franchise primarily focusing on a series of comedy-mystery films featuring an inept French police detective, Inspector Jacques Clouseau, as well as an animated series created by DePatie–Freleng Enterprises about the titular Pink Panther character. The franchise began with the release of the film The Pink Panther in 1963 and the animated cartoons began in 1964 with the short film The Pink Phink.

The role of Clouseau was first acted by and is most closely associated with Peter Sellers. Most of the films were written and directed by Blake Edwards, with theme music composed by Henry Mancini. Elements and characters inspired by the films were adapted into other media, including books, comic books, video games and animated series.

The first film in the series derives its title from a pink diamond that has enormous size and value. The diamond is called the "Pink Panther" because the flaw at its center, when viewed closely, is said to resemble a leaping pink panther. The phrase reappears in the title of the fourth film, The Return of the Pink Panther (1975), in which the theft of the diamond is again the center of the plot. The phrase was used for all the subsequent films in the series, even when the jewel did not figure in the plot. The jewel ultimately appeared in six of the eleven films.

The first film in the series had an animated opening sequence, created by DePatie–Freleng Enterprises, featuring "The Pink Panther Theme" by Mancini, as well as the Pink Panther character. Designed by Hawley Pratt and Friz Freleng, the animated Pink Panther character was subsequently featured in a series of theatrical cartoons, starting with The Pink Phink in 1964. The cartoon series gained its highest profile on television, aired on Saturday mornings as The Pink Panther Show. The character returned to the film series opening sequences in 1975.

== Synopsis of the original The Pink Panther film ==
The film series follows the exploits of an inept policeman named Inspector Jacques Clouseau. In his first adventure he is assigned to investigate Dala, a princess who received a gift from her father, the Maharajah: the "Pink Panther", the largest diamond in the world. This huge pink gem has an unusual flaw: by looking deeply into the stone, one perceives a tiny discoloration resembling a leaping panther. Twenty years later, Dala has been forced into exile following her father's death and the subsequent military takeover of her country. The new government declares her diamond the property of the people and petitions the World Court to determine ownership. However, Dala refuses to relinquish it.

Dala goes on holiday at an exclusive ski resort in Cortina d'Ampezzo. Also staying there is English middle-aged playboy Sir Charles Lytton, who leads a secret life as a gentleman jewel thief called "the Phantom" and has his eyes on the Pink Panther. His brash American nephew George arrives at the resort unexpectedly. George is really a playboy drowning in gambling debts, but poses as a recent college graduate about to enter the Peace Corps so his uncle continues to support his lavish lifestyle.

On the Phantom's trail is French police detective Inspector Jacques Clouseau, whose wife Simone is having an affair with Sir Charles. She has become rich by acting as a fence for the Phantom under the nose of her amorous but oblivious husband. She dodges him while trying to avoid her lover's playboy nephew, who has decided to make the seductive older woman his latest conquest. Sir Charles has grown enamored of Dala and is ambivalent about carrying out the heist. The night before their departure, George accidentally learns of his uncle's criminal activities.

At a gala, the heist is attempted by both Lytton and his nephew, only for them to find that the jewel is gone. Dala had faked the theft in order to retain the diamond. Lytton is arrested for the theft. Simone convinces Dala, who has fallen in love with Lytton, to frame Clouseau by planting the Pink Panther on him.

As Clouseau is taken away to prison, he is mobbed by a throng of enamored women. Watching from a distance, Simone expresses regret, but Sir Charles reassures her that when the Phantom strikes again, Clouseau will be exonerated and plans the Phantom's next heist in South America. The film ends after the police car carrying Clouseau to prison runs over a traffic warden.

== Films ==
Film	U.S. release date	Director(s)	Screenwriter(s)	Story by	Producer(s)	Starring
Original series						
The Pink Panther	December 18, 1963	Blake Edwards	Maurice Richlin & Blake Edwards	—N/a	Martin Jurow	Peter Sellers
A Shot in the Dark	June 23, 1964	Blake Edwards	Blake Edwards & William Peter Blatty	—N/a	Blake Edwards	Peter Sellers
Inspector Clouseau	May 28, 1968	Bud Yorkin	Tom Waldman & Frank Waldman	—N/a	Lewis J. Rachmil	Alan Arkin
The Return of the Pink Panther	May 21, 1975	Blake Edwards	Frank Waldman & Blake Edwards	—N/a	Blake Edwards	Peter Sellers
The Pink Panther Strikes Again	December 15, 1976	Blake Edwards	Frank Waldman & Blake Edwards	—N/a	Blake Edwards	Peter Sellers
Revenge of the Pink Panther	July 20, 1978	Blake Edwards	Frank Waldman, Ron Clark, & Blake Edwards	Blake Edwards	Blake Edwards	Peter Sellers
Trail of the Pink Panther	December 17, 1982	Blake Edwards	Frank Waldman, Tom Waldman, Blake Edwards, & Geoffrey Edwards	Blake Edwards	Blake Edwards & Tony Adams	Peter Sellers
Curse of the Pink Panther	August 12, 1983	Blake Edwards	Blake Edwards & Geoffrey Edwards	—N/a	Blake Edwards & Tony Adams	Ted Wass
Son of the Pink Panther	August 27, 1993	Blake Edwards	Blake Edwards, Madeline Sunshine, & Steve Sunshine	Blake Edwards	Tony Adams	Roberto Benigni
Reboot series						
The Pink Panther	February 10, 2006	Shawn Levy	Len Blum & Steve Martin	Len Blum & Michael Saltzman	Robert Simonds	Steve Martin
The Pink Panther 2	February 6, 2009	Harald Zwart	Scott Neustadter, Michael H. Weber, & Steve Martin	Scott Neustadter & Michael H. Weber	Robert Simonds	Steve Martin

=== Original series ===
==== The Pink Panther (1963) ====
The Pink Panther (1963), the original film of the series, centered on the Phantom/Sir Charles Lytton, portrayed by David Niven. It is set in the ski resort of Cortina d'Ampezzo. Peter Sellers's performance was so popular that the resulting series was built on the Clouseau character rather than the Phantom character. Niven and Sellers's co-stars included Capucine, Robert Wagner, and Claudia Cardinale.

==== A Shot in the Dark (1964) ====
A Shot in the Dark (1964) was released less than a year after The Pink Panther, and was the first to feature the Clouseau character as the protagonist of the film, investigating a murder set in a mansion in Paris. This film marked the first appearance of many of the tropes and supporting characters long associated with the series, including Commissioner Dreyfus (Herbert Lom), his assistant François (André Maranne), and Clouseau's manservant, Cato (Burt Kwouk). Elke Sommer, George Sanders, Graham Stark, Tracy Reed and Douglas Wilmer also appeared in the film.

==== Inspector Clouseau (1968) ====
The 1968 film Inspector Clouseau stars Alan Arkin as Clouseau, and does not feature any other recurring characters from the rest of the series. Although it was produced by the Mirisch Corporation (who owned the rights to the Pink Panther and Clouseau characters), key people associated with the earlier films, such as Peter Sellers, Blake Edwards, and Henry Mancini, were not involved in the making of this film.

==== The Return of the Pink Panther (1975) ====
More than a decade after his previous portrayal, Peter Sellers returned as Clouseau in 1975's The Return of the Pink Panther. The film marked the return of the famous "Pink Panther" diamond as well as most of the creative team associated with the prior films, including director Blake Edwards, composer Henry Mancini, Herbert Lom as Dreyfus, Burt Kwouk as Cato and André Maranne as François. Christopher Plummer appears as Sir Charles Lytton, after David Niven declined to reprise the role. The film also co-starred Catherine Schell, Peter Arne, and Graham Stark.

==== The Pink Panther Strikes Again (1976) ====
In The Pink Panther Strikes Again (1976), Dreyfus' insanity reached its zenith, as he tried to blackmail the rest of the world into killing Clouseau. It co-starred Leonard Rossiter, Lesley-Anne Down, Michael Robbins, Colin Blakely, and featured an uncredited cameo by Omar Sharif.

==== Revenge of the Pink Panther (1978) ====
Revenge of the Pink Panther (1978) pitted Clouseau against the French Connection. It is the last in which Sellers played Clouseau. It co-starred Dyan Cannon, Robert Webber, Robert Loggia and Graham Stark.

==== Trail of the Pink Panther (1982) ====
Trail of the Pink Panther (1982) was the first Pink Panther film made following Peter Sellers' death in 1980. Sellers' role as Clouseau is created by using several scenes cut from Strikes Again, as well as flashbacks from the previous Pink Panther films. The film was intended as a tribute to Sellers, but after its release, Sellers' widow Lynne Frederick successfully sued Edwards and Metro-Goldwyn-Mayer for tarnishing her husband's memory. David Niven and Capucine reprise their original roles from the first Pink Panther film. Trail was a critical and commercial failure.

==== Curse of the Pink Panther (1983) ====
1983's Curse of the Pink Panther is the first to feature a different lead character, blundering American detective Sgt. Clifton Sleigh, portrayed by Ted Wass. Inspector Clouseau and the Pink Panther diamond, both of which had disappeared in Trail, are pursued by Sleigh. Clouseau returns, after having plastic surgery to disguise his identity, in a cameo appearance by Roger Moore (who is credited as "Turk Thrust II"). Although intended to spawn a new series of misadventures for the inept Sergeant Sleigh, the film's dismal box-office performance and critical drubbing, along with a complicated series of lawsuits between Edwards and Metro-Goldwyn-Mayer, led to a decade-long hiatus of the series. The lawsuit was eventually settled out of court in 1988, around the time Edwards came up with one final film idea that would ultimately become the unofficial series finale.

==== Son of the Pink Panther (1993) ====
In Son of the Pink Panther (1993), Blake Edwards made one final attempt to revive the Pink Panther series, this time by casting Italian actor Roberto Benigni as Gendarme Jacques Gambrelli, Inspector Clouseau's illegitimate son by Maria Gambrelli, the murder suspect from A Shot in the Dark (1964). Once again, regular Panther co-stars return – Herbert Lom, Burt Kwouk, and Graham Stark, and a star of the original 1963 film, Claudia Cardinale. Although intended to relaunch the series with the blundering Jacques as a lead, Son failed both critically and commercially and became the final installment in the original Pink Panther series. It was also the final film for both retiring director Blake Edwards and composer Henry Mancini, who died in 1994.

=== Reboot series ===
==== The Pink Panther (2006) ====
This reboot launches a new Pink Panther film series starring Steve Martin as Inspector Clouseau and Kevin Kline as Chief Inspector Dreyfus. Not a remake of the original film, it forms a new starting point for a contemporary series, introducing the Clouseau and Dreyfus characters along with the famous diamond to a new generation. The film was panned by most critics, and grossed $164.1 million against an $80 million budget.

==== The Pink Panther 2 (2009) ====
The sequel to Steve Martin's 2006 film. Martin reprises his role, but John Cleese replaces Kevin Kline as Chief Inspector Dreyfus. This film received negative reviews and meager box office, grossing a worldwide total of $76 million against a budget of $70 million.

=== Future ===
In March 2014, Metro-Goldwyn-Mayer announced plans to develop a new live-action/CGI hybrid feature film starring the Pink Panther, which was set to be directed by David Silverman, with Walter Mirisch and Julie Andrews serving as producers. Andrews, who is the widow of Blake Edwards, would be creatively involved in the process of developing the new project, which unlike previous installments would focus on the titular character instead of the franchise's main character, Inspector Jacques Clouseau. By November 2020, Jeff Fowler had joined the production replacing Silverman as director. Chris Bremner was hired to write the script, while Lawrence Mirisch will serve as an additional producer. The plot will center around the Pink Panther character and Inspector Clouseau.

By April 2023, it was announced that after acquiring MGM, Amazon was developing new additions to the franchise in the form of a movie and television series through their subsidiary Amazon Studios (now called Amazon MGM Studios). It was later reported that Eddie Murphy was in talks to star in the film as Clouseau. Murphy confirmed in July 2025 that he would play Clouseau.

== Main cast and characters ==
List indicators

This section includes characters who will appear or have appeared in multiple installments in the franchise.

- An empty grey cell indicates the character was not in the film, or that the character's official presence has not yet been confirmed.
- ^{A} indicates an appearance through archival footage or audio.
- ^{C} indicates a cameo role.
- ^{E} indicates an appearance not included in the theatrical cut.
- ^{P} indicates an appearance in onscreen photographs.
- ^{U} indicates an uncredited appearance.
- ^{V} indicates a voice-only role.
- ^{Y} indicates a younger version of the character.

Character	Original series									Reboot series	
Character	The Pink Panther	A Shot in the Dark	Inspector Clouseau	The Return of the Pink Panther	The Pink Panther Strikes Again	Revenge of the Pink Panther	Trail of the Pink Panther	Curse of the Pink Panther	Son of the Pink Panther	The Pink Panther	The Pink Panther 2
Inspector Jacques Clouseau	Peter Sellers	Peter Sellers	Alan Arkin	Peter Sellers	Peter Sellers	Peter Sellers	Peter Sellers^{A} Daniel Peacock^{Y} Lucca Mezzofanti^{Y}	Roger Moore^{C}	Peter Sellers^{P}	Steve Martin	Steve Martin
Sir Charles Lytton/The Phantom	David Niven			Christopher Plummer			David Niven Rich Little^{V}^{U}	David Niven Rich Little^{V}^{U}			
Simone Clouseau/Lady Simone Lytton	Capucine						Capucine	Capucine			
George Lytton	Robert Wagner							Robert Wagner			
Chief Inspector Charles Dreyfus		Herbert Lom		Herbert Lom	Herbert Lom	Herbert Lom	Herbert Lom	Herbert Lom	Herbert Lom	Kevin Kline	John Cleese
Cato Fong		Burt Kwouk		Burt Kwouk	Burt Kwouk	Burt Kwouk	Burt Kwouk	Burt Kwouk	Burt Kwouk		
Sergeant François Chevalier/François Duval		André Maranne		André Maranne	André Maranne	André Maranne	André Maranne	André Maranne	Dermot Crowley		
Hercule LaJoy		Graham Stark					Graham Stark				
Maria Gambrelli		Elke Sommer							Claudia Cardinale		
Professor Auguste Balls					Harvey Korman^{E}	Graham Stark	Harvey Korman^{A}	Harvey Korman	Graham Stark		
Mr. Chong						Ed Parker		Ed Parker			
Gendarme Gilbert Ponton										Jean Reno	Jean Reno
Nicole Durant										Emily Mortimer	Emily Mortimer
Renard										Philip Goodwin	Philip Goodwin

== Recurring cast members ==
Actor	Film										
Actor	The Pink Panther	A Shot in the Dark	Inspector Clouseau	The Return of the Pink Panther	The Pink Panther Strikes Again	Revenge of the Pink Panther	Trail of the Pink Panther	Curse of the Pink Panther	Son of the Pink Panther	The Pink Panther	The Pink Panther 2
Graham Stark		Hercule LaJoy		Pepi	Bavarian Innkeeper	Prof. Auguste Balls	Hercule LaJoy	Waiter	Prof. Auguste Balls		
David Lodge		Georges Duval		Mac							
Douglas Wilmer		Henri LaFarge				Police Commissioner					
Claudia Cardinale	Princess Dala								Maria Gambrelli		
Joanna Lumley							Marie Jouvet	Countess Chandra			
Robert Loggia						Al Marchione	Bruno Langois	Bruno Langois			
Peter Arne				Colonel Sharki			Colonel Bufoni	Colonel Bufoni			
Julie Andrews				Maid (deleted scene)	Ainsley Jarvis (singing voice)		Charwoman				
Eric Pohlmann			Bergesch	The Fat Man							
Geoffrey Bayldon			Gutch		Dr. Claude Duval						
Tutte Lemkow		Kazak dancer	Frenchie LeBec								
John Bluthal				Blind Beggar		Guard at Cemetery					
Herb Tanney				Nice police chief	Norwegian assassin	Hong Kong police chief		Lugash secret policeman	Jean Claude		

== Additional crew and production details ==
Film	Producer	Director	Screenwriter	Production Designer	Cinematographer	Editor	Composer
The Pink Panther	Martin Jurow	Blake Edwards	Maurice Richlin & Blake Edwards	Fernando Carrere	Philip H. Lathrop	Ralph E. Winters	Henry Mancini
A Shot in the Dark	Blake Edwards	Blake Edwards	Blake Edwards & William Peter Blatty	Michael Stringer	Christopher Challis	Ralph E. Winters	Henry Mancini
Inspector Clouseau	Lewis J. Rachmil	Bud Yorkin	Tom Waldman & Frank Waldman	Michael Stringer	Arthur Ibbetson	John Victor-Smith	Ken Thorne
The Return of the Pink Panther	Blake Edwards & Tony Adams	Blake Edwards	Frank Waldman & Blake Edwards	Peter Mullins	Geoffrey Unsworth	Alan Jones	Henry Mancini
The Pink Panther Strikes Again	Blake Edwards & Tony Adams	Blake Edwards	Frank Waldman & Blake Edwards	Peter Mullins	Harry Waxman	Alan Jones	Henry Mancini
Revenge of the Pink Panther	Blake Edwards & Tony Adams	Blake Edwards	Frank Waldman & Ron Clark & Blake Edwards	Peter Mullins	Ernest Day	Alan Jones	Henry Mancini
Trail of the Pink Panther	Blake Edwards & Tony Adams	Blake Edwards	Frank Waldman & Tom Waldman & Blake Edwards & Geoffrey Edwards	Peter Mullins	Dick Bush	Alan Jones	Henry Mancini
Curse of the Pink Panther	Blake Edwards & Tony Adams	Blake Edwards	Blake Edwards & Geoffrey Edwards	Peter Mullins	Dick Bush	Ralph E. Winters	Henry Mancini
Son of the Pink Panther	Blake Edwards & Tony Adams	Blake Edwards	Blake Edwards & Madeline Sunshine & Steve Sunshine	Peter Mullins	Dick Bush	Robert Pergament	Henry Mancini
The Pink Panther	Robert Simonds	Shawn Levy	Len Blum & Steve Martin & Michael Saltzman	Lilly Kilvert	Jonathan Brown	George Folsey, Jr.	Christophe Beck
The Pink Panther 2	Robert Simonds	Harald Zwart	Scott Neustadter & Michael H. Weber & Steve Martin	Rusty Smith	Denis Crossan	Julia Wong	Christophe Beck

== Production ==
=== Development ===
==== 20th-century film series ====
Most of the films in the series starred Peter Sellers as Inspector Clouseau and were directed and co-written by Blake Edwards. As detailed in the director's commentary for the first film, the Inspector Clouseau character was originally conceived as a vehicle for David Niven, but once written it was decided he should play the raconteur/thief. Then the role was offered to Peter Ustinov, with Ava Gardner to play his wife. When Gardner dropped out, so did Ustinov, so the role of Clouseau went to Sellers. Apparently, the tone of the film changed after Edwards picked up Sellers from the airport, and during the ride to the hotel, they bonded over their mutual love of old film comedians like Harold Lloyd, Buster Keaton and Laurel & Hardy. The role was then modified to include elements of slapstick. The jazz-based Pink Panther Theme was composed by Henry Mancini. In addition to the credits sequences, the theme often accompanies any suspenseful sequence in the first film and in most of the subsequent films featuring the character of Clouseau.

The "Pink Panther" of the title is a diamond supposedly containing a flaw that forms the image of a "leaping panther" which can be seen if held up to the light in a certain way. This is explained at the beginning of the first film, and the camera zooms in on the diamond to reveal the blurry flaw, which focuses on the cartoon Panther (though not actually leaping) to begin the opening credits sequence. (This is also done in The Return of the Pink Panther [1975].) The plot of the first film is based on the theft of this diamond. The diamond reappears in several later films in the series, The Return of the Pink Panther (1975), Trail of the Pink Panther (1982) and Curse of the Pink Panther (1983). It also appears in the revival of the Inspector Clouseau character in the Steve Martin reboot films The Pink Panther (2006), and its sequel The Pink Panther 2 (2009). The name "the Pink Panther" became attached to Inspector Clouseau in much the same way that Frankenstein has been used in film titles to refer to Dr. Frankenstein's creation, or The Thin Man was used in a series of detective films.

A Shot in the Dark, the second film in the series, was not originally intended to feature Clouseau and is the first of two films in the series (the other being Inspector Clouseau) that features neither the diamond nor the distinctive animated Pink Panther character in the opening credits and ending. Many critics, including Leonard Maltin, regard A Shot in the Dark as the best film in the series.

In the original film, released in 1963, the main focus was on David Niven's role as Sir Charles Litton, the infamous jewel thief nicknamed "the Phantom", and his plan to steal the Pink Panther diamond. Inspector Clouseau was only a secondary character as Litton's incompetent antagonist and provided slapstick to an otherwise subtle, lighthearted caper film, a somewhat jarring contrast of styles which is typical of Edwards's films. The popularity of Clouseau caused him to become the main character in subsequent Pink Panther films, which were more straightforward slapstick comedies.

Mancini's theme, with variations in arrangement, is used at the start of all but the first two of the subsequent films. Mancini's other themes for the first film include an Italian-language set-piece called "Meglio stasera", whose purpose seems primarily to introduce young actress Fran Jeffries. Portions of an instrumental version also appear in the film's musical score several times. Other segments include "Shades of Sennett", a "honky-tonk" piano number introducing the film's climactic chase scene through the streets of Rome. Most of the remaining tracks on the soundtrack album are the early 1960s orchestral jazz pieces, matching the style of the era. Although variations of the main theme would reprise for many of the Pink Panther series entries, as well as the cartoon series, Mancini composed different theme music for A Shot in the Dark; this theme was later adopted by the animated spin-off series The Inspector.

Although official, the live-action film Inspector Clouseau (1968) starring Alan Arkin as Clouseau, is generally not considered by fans to be part of the series canon, since it involved neither Sellers nor Edwards. However, some elements of Arkin's performance and costuming of Clouseau were retained when Sellers resumed the role in Return in 1975. Despite speculation, Arkin does not appear in Trail of the Pink Panther.

==== 2000s film series ====
The film that launched the second Pink Panther series, The Pink Panther, starring Steve Martin as Clouseau, directed by Shawn Levy and produced by Robert Simonds, was released in February 2006 by Metro-Goldwyn-Mayer and was co-produced with Columbia Pictures. It is set in the present day and introduces different main characters, therefore belonging to a different continuity. Martin also stars in the sequel, The Pink Panther 2, released in 2009.

== Reception ==
=== Box office performance ===
Film	Release date	Box office gross			Budget	Ref.
Film	Release date	North America	Other territories	Worldwide	Budget	Ref.
Original series
The Pink Panther	18 December 1963	$10,878,107	—N/a	$10,878,107		
A Shot in the Dark	23 June 1964	$12,368,234	—N/a	$12,368,234		
Inspector Clouseau	28 May 1968	$1,900,000	—N/a	$1,900,000		
The Return of the Pink Panther	21 May 1975	$41,833,347	—N/a	$41,833,347	$5 million	
The Pink Panther Strikes Again	15 December 1976	$33,833,201	—N/a	$33,833,201	$6 million	
Revenge of the Pink Panther	19 June 1978	$49,579,269	—N/a	$49,579,269	$12 million	
Trail of the Pink Panther	17 December 1982	$9,056,073	—N/a	$9,056,073	$6 million	
Curse of the Pink Panther	12 August 1983	$4,491,986	—N/a	$4,491,986	$11 million	
Son of the Pink Panther	27 August 1993	$2,438,031	—N/a	$2,438,031	$28 million	
Reboot series
The Pink Panther	9 February 2006	$82,226,474	$81,889,423	$164,115,897	$80 million	
The Pink Panther 2	5 February 2009	$35,922,978	$40,102,156	$76,025,134	$70 million	
Total		$284,527,700	$121,991,579	$406,519,279	$218,000,000	

=== Critical and public response ===
Title	Clouseau actor (or alternative protagonist)	Release date	Rotten Tomatoes	Budget	US/Canada gross	Worldwide gross	ref
Original series
The Pink Panther	Peter Sellers	December 18, 1963	90%	N/A	$10,878,107	N/A	
A Shot in the Dark	Peter Sellers	June 23, 1964	93%	N/A	$12,368,234	N/A	
Inspector Clouseau	Alan Arkin	February 14, 1968	0%	N/A	$1,900,000	N/A	
The Return of the Pink Panther	Peter Sellers	May 21, 1975	89%	$5 million	$41,833,347	$75,000,000	
The Pink Panther Strikes Again	Peter Sellers	December 15, 1976	83%	$6 million	$33,833,201	$75,000,000	
Revenge of the Pink Panther	Peter Sellers	July 19, 1978	78%	$12 million	$49,579,269	N/A	
Trail of the Pink Panther	Peter Sellers (outtake footage)	December 17, 1982	25%	$6 million	$9,056,073	N/A	
Curse of the Pink Panther	Ted Wass (as Sergeant Sleigh, an American bumbling detective)	August 12, 1983	29%	$11 million	$4,491,986	N/A	
Son of the Pink Panther	Roberto Benigni (as Officer Gambrelli, Clouseau's illegitimate son)	August 27, 1993	6%	$28 million	$2,438,031	$20,000,000	
Reboot series
The Pink Panther	Steve Martin	February 10, 2006	21%	$80 million	$82,226,474	$164,115,897	
The Pink Panther 2	Steve Martin	February 6, 2009	12%	$70 million	$35,922,978	$76,025,134	

== Cartoons ==
The opening title sequence in the original 1963 The Pink Panther film was such a success with the United Artists executives that they decided to adapt the title sequence into a series of theatrical animated shorts. DePatie–Freleng Enterprises, run by former Warner Bros. Cartoons personnel David H. DePatie and Isadore "Friz" Freleng, produced the opening sequences, with Freleng as director. United Artists commissioned a long series of The Pink Panther shorts, the first of which, 1964's The Pink Phink, won the 1964 Academy Award for Animated Short Film. This was the first (and to date only) time a studio's first work won an Oscar.

By the autumn of 1969, the shorts were being broadcast on NBC during Saturday mornings on The Pink Panther Show; after 1969, new shorts were produced for both television broadcast and theatrical release. A number of sister series also joined the Pink Panther character on movie screens and on the airwaves, including The Inspector, featuring a comical French police officer based on the Jacques Clouseau character. Traditionally mute, the Pink Panther was given the voice of actor Matt Frewer for a 1993–1995 animated TV series and the voice of Michael Sinterniklaas for two computer games based on this series: The Pink Panther: Passport to Peril (1996) and The Pink Panther: Hokus Pokus Pink (1997).

In addition to computer and console games, the Pink Panther character has appeared advertising campaigns for several companies, most notably for Owens Corning Fiberglass insulation. He also starred in a short-lived animated series entitled Pink Panther and Pals (2010), which is aimed at younger children. In 2014, MGM announced (see above) that it was planning an animation / live-action hybrid film reboot of the franchise, to be directed by David Silverman and produced by Walter Mirisch and Julie Andrews. But in November 2020, it was later announced that Jeff Fowler will direct the movie instead with Mirisch and Andrews still producing. The animated Pink Panther character also appeared in a short animated segment on the educational TV series Sesame Street, demonstrating his karate skills to carve the letter K out of a block of stone, only for it to crumble quickly afterward.

== Cancelled projects ==
=== Romance of the Pink Panther ===
Romance of the Pink Panther would have been the seventh film in the franchise, and written by Peter Sellers and Jim Moloney. Due to a rift between Blake Edwards and Sellers, Edwards would not have directed the film. The basic plot was to involve Inspector Clouseau becoming smitten with a cat burglar called "the Frog", played by Pamela Stephenson. Shortly after Sellers' death in July 1980, it was reported that Dudley Moore might play Clouseau, but Blake Edwards instead chose to introduce a new character in the series, rather than recast the role of Clouseau. Both Clive Donner and Sidney Poitier were reported at various times to be directing the movie, with Donner's name in that role on the cover sheet of the July 1980 'final draft' script.

=== Pink Panther television series ===
In the late 1980s, MGM/UA had been developing a live action/animation hybrid Pink Panther TV series, focusing on a young reporter to be portrayed by Charlie Schlatter who is helped in his investigations by the Pink Panther. The series was encouraged by the success of Who Framed Roger Rabbit, but for unknown reasons, it was not greenlit.

== See also ==
- The Inspector, a cartoon based on Inspector Clouseau
- Pink Panthers (organized crime group), the name given by Interpol to a group of Montenegrin thieves who successfully executed several jewel heists starting in 1993.
- Pink Panthers (advocacy group), a name used for several different LGBT rights organizations in North America since the 1970s.
