= Metro-Goldwyn-Mayer Animation =

American animation studio

- Type: Division
- Industry: Animation
- Predecessor: MGM Cartoons; MGM Animation/Visual Arts
- Founded: 1993; 33 years ago
- Founder: Paul Sabella; Jonathan Dern
- Defunct: 2002; 24 years ago
- Fate: Dormancy
- Headquarters: Hollywood, California, United States
- Products: Television shows Feature films
- Parent: Metro-Goldwyn-Mayer

Metro-Goldwyn-Mayer Animation (shortened to MGM Animation) was an American animation division of Metro-Goldwyn-Mayer, that specializes in animated productions for theatrical features and television, and based in Hollywood, California. It was founded in 1993 and primarily involved in producing children's entertainment based upon MGM's ownership of intellectual properties, such as The Pink Panther, The Lionhearts, The Secret of NIMH, and All Dogs Go to Heaven.

Paul Sabella and Jonathan Dern, the founders of the studio, had left in 1999 and founded SD Entertainment that same year. The studio has been dormant since 2002, just two years after the 2000 release of their final production Tom Sawyer.

== Filmography ==
=== Theatrical ===
Release date	Title	Notes
March 29, 1996	All Dogs Go to Heaven 2	co-production with MGM/UA Family Entertainment

=== Direct-to-video ===
Release date	Title	Notes
March 4, 1997	MGM Sing-Alongs: Searching for Your Dreams	
March 4, 1997	MGM Sing-Alongs: Friends	
March 4, 1997	MGM Sing-Alongs: Having Fun	
March 4, 1997	MGM Sing-Alongs: Being Happy	
October 14, 1997	Babes in Toyland	co-production with MGM/UA Family Entertainment
November 17, 1998	An All Dogs Christmas Carol	co-production with MGM Family Entertainment
December 22, 1998	The Secret of NIMH 2: Timmy to the Rescue	co-production with MGM Family Entertainment
April 4, 2000	Tom Sawyer	

=== TV series ===
Title	Year(s)	Network	Notes
The Pink Panther	1993–1995	Syndication	co-production with Mirisch-Geoffrey DePatie-Freleng and United Artists
All Dogs Go to Heaven: The Series	1996–1998	Syndication (1996–1998); Fox Family Channel (1998)	
RoboCop: Alpha Commando	1998–1999	Syndication	co-production with Fireworks Entertainment and Orion Pictures syndicated by The Summit Media Group
The Lionhearts	1998	Syndication	

=== Miscellaneous productions ===
Title	Year	Notes
The Adventures of Hyperman	1995	Video game

=== Unproduced projects ===
Title	Release date	Type	Notes
The Betty Boop Movie	1993	Feature film	There were plans for an animated musical feature film of Betty Boop to be MGM Animation's first theatrical animated film, but the plans were later canceled. The musical storyboard scene of the proposed film can be seen online. The finished reel consists of Betty and her estranged father performing a jazz number together called "Where are you?" Jimmy Rowles and Sue Raney provide the vocals for Betty and Benny Boop. Later, All Dogs Go to Heaven 2 became MGM Animation's only theatrical animated film.
Stargate: The Young Explorers	1997	Feature film	A proposed direct-to-video film based on MGM's Stargate franchise that was announced to be in development alongside Babes in Toyland and The Secret of NIMH II. While the movie was never produced it's possible some of the concepts were incorporated into the animated series Stargate: Infinity.
Noah	1998	Feature film	According to Animation Magazine, MGM Animation had plans to do a theatrical animated film adaption of comedian Bill Cosby's famous stand up sketch of his take of Noah's Ark with Cosby producing, co-writing the script with Charles Kipps and as the voice of God, while Mel Brooks, Carl Reiner and Jonathan Winters were in talks to voice Noah. However the project was canceled after Cosby's previous films were both commercial and critically failures and more people were becoming aware of Cosby's sex abuse cases.

== See also ==
- List of Metro-Goldwyn-Mayer theatrical animated feature films
- Metro-Goldwyn-Mayer cartoon studio
- MGM Animation/Visual Arts
- SD Entertainment
