= The Pink Panther 2 =

- Theatrical release poster
- Directed by: Harald Zwart
- Screenplay by: Steve Martin; Scott Neustadter; Michael H. Weber
- Story by: Scott Neustadter; Michael H. Weber
- Based on: The Pink Panther by Blake Edwards; Maurice Richlin
- Produced by: Robert Simonds
- Starring: Steve Martin; Jean Reno; Alfred Molina; Emily Mortimer; Aishwarya Rai Bachchan; Andy Garcia; Lily Tomlin; John Cleese
- Cinematography: Denis Crossan
- Edited by: Julia Wong
- Music by: Christophe Beck; Henry Mancini (Theme)
- Production companies: Metro-Goldwyn-Mayer Pictures; Columbia Pictures; Robert Simonds Company
- Distributed by: Sony Pictures Releasing
- Release dates: January 24, 2009 (Alpe d'Huez); February 6, 2009 (United States)
- Running time: 92 minutes
- Country: United States
- Language: English
- Budget: $70 million
- Box office: $76 million

The Pink Panther 2 is a 2009 American comedy-mystery film directed by Harald Zwart. It is the eleventh installment in the Pink Panther film series and the sequel to the 2006 film The Pink Panther. Steve Martin, Jean Reno and Emily Mortimer reprise their roles from the previous film, with Alfred Molina, Aishwarya Rai Bachchan, Andy Garcia, Lily Tomlin and John Cleese joining the cast. In the film, Clouseau (Martin) must team up with detectives from other countries to rout a daring burglar, The Tornado, who has returned after a decade's inactivity.

Martin polished the original script written by Scott Neustadter and Michael H. Weber in November 2006. In January 2007, the writing team of Lowell Ganz and Babaloo Mandel were hired to perform a further rewrite. Principal photography began in Paris in August 2007, before moving to Boston several weeks later, where filming ended that November.

The Pink Panther 2 premiered at Alpe d'Huez on January 24, 2009, and was released by Columbia Pictures in North America on February 6. The film received generally negative reviews from critics, underperformed at the box office and grossed $76 million against a $70 million budget.

== Plot ==
When master thief "The Tornado" steals priceless artifacts from around the world, the French government assembles a "Dream Team" of investigators to solve the case. Meanwhile, Inspector Clouseau is reassigned from his task as a parking officer by Chief Inspector Dreyfus to join the detectives in Japan, where The Tornado's latest heist occurred, despite Clouseau stating him leaving France would result in the Pink Panther diamond left unguarded. After Clouseau crosses the "borders" of France at an airport gate, news then breaks that the Pink Panther diamond has been stolen. Clouseau meets the rest of the Dream Team: Detective Chief Inspector Randall Pepperidge from Great Britain; Vincenzo Brancaleoni, a businessman from Italy; Kenji Mazuto, a technology expert from Japan; and Sonia Solandres, a criminologist from India, who arrives from a delayed flight. During the case, Vincenzo becomes smitten with Nicole, Clouseau's girlfriend; Clouseau attempts to dissuade him, but Vincenzo continuously relays the insults to Nicole.

The team goes to Rome to investigate a black market fence, Alonso Avellaneda. Assuming Avellaneda is The Tornado, the Dream Team questions him while Clouseau snoops around. Avellaneda lacks a characteristic bullet wound The Tornado received years ago, so the detectives leave. Later, he meets with the real Tornado. That night, Clouseau and his partner Ponton spy on Avellaneda at a restaurant using an audio bug. The mission is compromised when they find Vincenzo and Nicole having dinner there. Banned from the restaurant for accidentally burning it down months earlier, Clouseau disguises himself as a dancer and switches the bug to Nicole's table, inadvertently burning down the restaurant again in the process.

Meanwhile, The Tornado steals the Pope's ring, souring public opinion against the Dream Team. When Clouseau's incompetence aggravates the situation, he is voted off the team. Clouseau is later called to an office and finds that The Tornado, a man named Laurence Milliken, has killed himself, leaving a note claiming he destroyed the Pink Panther – considering it so beautiful that he could not allow anyone else to own it – and left the other treasures to be recovered. Examining a key found in the Pope's Chambers, the Dream Team match the dead man's DNA with the one recovered from when The Tornado was shot and believe they have solved the case. However, Clouseau remains unconvinced.

A celebration is thrown in the Dream Team's honor, although Clouseau is uninvited. While wandering near the party, Clouseau sees the license plate of Sonia's car and calls Ponton. Clouseau then tells Dreyfus that Sonia is the real thief, but is ignored. Dreyfus tells Clouseau's theory to the group, who jokingly work out a plausible explanation: as The Tornado's ex-lover, she would have in-depth knowledge of his methods, and could have drawn attention to the thefts of the other artifacts, leaving her free to sell the diamond. Nicole, realizing Clouseau could be correct, asks Sonia to empty her purse. After initially trying to leave, Sonia pulls out a gun, threatening to shoot Nicole, before shooting Clouseau. However, the bullet ricochets off his Légion d'honneur medal. A chase ensues, with the Dream Team suffering due to various accidents caused by Clouseau's clumsiness. Finally cornered, Sonia threatens to destroy the diamond and, goaded by Clouseau, she does. Before she can escape, however, Sonia is knocked out by Ponton and arrested.

Clouseau reveals that Sonia destroyed a fake gem, as Clouseau kept the real diamond in his possession to protect it. Before Clouseau left France, The Pink Panther at the museum was swapped with a replica he owned. Furthermore, The Tornado, an expert on gems, would have recognized the fake diamond, allowing Clouseau to deduce that his suicide note was forged, and The Tornado was actually murdered. Clouseau had given a ticket to Sonia's car one day before the diamond was stolen – contradicting her alibi of being delayed to the original crime scene by her flight. This confirmed to him that Sonia was the culprit and that she used the Dream Team, and (implicitly) Clouseau's mishaps, as a strategic cover.

Later, Clouseau marries Nicole in a ceremony officiated by Dreyfus and attended by the Dream Team, especially Pepperidge, who showed up in a pink ballet tutu as per his deal, should Clouseau be the one that solves the case. The wedding ends in chaos when Dreyfus accidentally destroys a security camera with a champagne cork, summoning the Black Berets. In the ensuing confusion, Clouseau and Nicole leave for their honeymoon, passing by the animated Pink Panther on their way out. Following this, the Panther invites himself to the chaos.

== Cast ==
- Steve Martin as Inspector Jacques Clouseau, a clumsy police officer and now-recognized "Protector of the Pink Panther", who joins the Dream Team to bring the Tornado to justice and recover the Pink Panther once more.
- Jean Reno as Gendarme Gilbert Ponton, Clouseau's assistant and sidekick.
- Alfred Molina as Randall Pepperidge, a British Metropolitan Police detective chief inspector who joins the Dream Team.
- Emily Mortimer as Nicole Durant, Clouseau's assistant and romantic interest.
- Aishwarya Rai Bachchan as Sonia Solandres, a corrupt Indian criminologist and renowned chronicler of The Tornado who initially joins the Dream Team but turns out to be the antagonist of the film.
- Andy Garcia as Vincenzo Roccara Squarcialupi Brancaleoni, an Italian businessman who joins the Dream Team.
- Lily Tomlin as Mrs. Yvette Berenger, a manners teacher who runs Human Resources for the Dream Team and often calls Clouseau into her office to discuss his suggestive manners and prejudices.
- John Cleese as Chief Inspector Charles Dreyfus, Clouseau's boss who often gives him meaningless assignments to get him out of his hair. Cleese replaces Kevin Kline from the first film.
- Yuki Matsuzaki as Kenji Mazuto, a Japanese technology expert who joins the Dream Team.
- Geoffrey Palmer as Joubert
- Johnny Hallyday as Laurence Milliken / The Tornado, a master thief who specializes in stealing valuable artifacts.
- Jeremy Irons as Alonso Avellaneda, a known fence and associate of The Tornado.
- Yevgeni Lazarev as the Pope
- Christiane Amanpour as herself
- Sharon Tay as CNN reporter
- Jack Metzger as Antoine
- Phillip Goodwin as Renard
- Lewis D. Wheeler as Black beret

== Production ==
The film was shot in Paris, France, Boston, Bedford, Chelsea, Westwood, and Winchester, Massachusetts and Trenton, New Jersey from August 20 to November 2, 2007. Much like previous installments, this film also featured an animated opening title sequence animated by Imaginary Forces.

== Release ==
The Pink Panther 2 was theatrically released on February 6, 2009, by Metro-Goldwyn-Mayer and Columbia Pictures. The film was released on DVD and Blu-ray on June 23, 2009, by 20th Century Fox Home Entertainment and MGM Home Entertainment.

== Soundtrack ==
Composer Christophe Beck returned to compose the score for the sequel as well as adapting Henry Mancini's Pink Panther theme.

- The Pink Panther Theme
- Habanera Para Baile
- Sonia's Love
- Finale in C Major
- Bridal Chorus

== Reception ==
=== Critical response ===
On Rotten Tomatoes, the film holds an approval rating of 13% based on 137 reviews, with an average rating of 3.7/10. The site's critical consensus reads, "Underutilizing its talented cast, The Pink Panther 2 is little more than a series of lame slapstick gags." On Metacritic, the film has a weighted average score of 36 out of 100 based on 30 critics, indicating "generally unfavorable reviews". Audiences polled by CinemaScore gave the film an average grade of "B+" on an A+ to F scale, up from the first film's "B".

=== Box office ===
The Pink Panther 2 grossed $35.9 million in North America and $40 million in other territories for a worldwide total of $75.9 million, against a budget of $70 million. The film made $11.6 million in its opening weekend, finishing fourth at the box office. The film was released in the United Kingdom on February 13, 2009, and opened at #8.

== Future ==
On November 19, 2020, Metro-Goldwyn-Mayer (MGM) announced that a new Pink Panther film is in the works with Sonic the Hedgehog director Jeff Fowler attached to direct and Chris Bremner attached to write the script. Unlike the previous films which only focused on Inspector Clouseau, the new film will focus on both Clouseau and the animated Pink Panther cartoon character. By April 2023, it was announced that after acquiring MGM, Amazon is developing new additions to the franchise in the form of a movie and television series through their subsidiary Amazon Studios (now called Amazon MGM Studios). It was later reported that Eddie Murphy was in talks to star in the film as Clouseau. As of 2026, the film is still in development and no news has been heard on it since then.

== See also ==
- List of The Pink Panther cartoons
- List of live-action films based on cartoons and comics
