= Frank Biondi =

American businessman (1945–2019)

- Born: Frank Joseph Biondi Jr. January 9, 1945; New York City, New York, U.S.
- Died: November 25, 2019 (aged 74); Los Angeles, California, U.S.
- Education: Princeton University (A.B.); Harvard Business School (M.B.A.)

Frank Joseph Biondi Jr. (January 9, 1945 – November 25, 2019) was an American businessman and entertainment executive, who held leadership roles at Viacom, Universal Pictures, and HBO.

== Early life and education ==
Biondi was born in New York City, to Virginia Willis and Frank Biondi Sr., and was raised in Livingston, New Jersey. His father was a former executive at Bell Telephone Company. Biondi graduated from Livingston High School in 1964 and was inducted into the school's hall of fame in 1994. He graduated with an A.B. in psychology from Princeton University in 1966 after completing an 81-page long senior thesis titled "The Use of a Biographical Inventory for Junior Executive Recruitment in a Large Retail Firm." He later received a M.B.A. from Harvard Business School.

== Career ==
In 1968, Biondi got his start as a financial analyst and investment banker on Wall Street for Cogan, Berlind, Weill & Levitt. There, he met Clarence B. Jones, who recommended him for a consulting job at TelePrompTer Corporation, one of the largest cable companies at the time. However, TelePrompTer had defrauded its investors by misrepresenting their cash flow. In response, the U.S. Securities and Exchange Commission placed a trade block on their stock for around 100 days, which tanked its valuation. Biondi was let go as a result of corporate restructuring. He later found employment with the nonprofit, Children’s Television Workshop (CTW), who produced Sesame Street and The Electric Company, in 1974. After a tumultuous time at TelePrompTer, he cites the relatively "nice, safe" environment of a non-profit as the reason he chose the job at CTW.

Michael J. Fuchs recruited Biondi to HBO in 1978 as head of co-productions. Biondi initially expressed disinterest in joining and rejected their initial offer. He later became the president and CEO in 1983. Fuchs replaced him as HBO CEO the following year.

In 1985, Biondi went on to serve as external vice president for Coca-Cola's entertainment business sector. In 1986, Coca-Cola consolidated its television companies — Columbia Pictures Television, Embassy Communications, and Merv Griffin Enterprises — into Coca-Cola Television, and Biondi was tapped to serve as its CEO. Coca-Cola Television was eventually spun off and sold to TriStar Pictures in 1987. TriStar subsequently renamed itself Columbia Pictures and its founder, Victor Kaufman, continued his role as CEO of the merged company.

Biondi was the president and CEO of Viacom from 1987 to 1996 and the chairman and CEO of Universal Pictures from 1996 to 1998.

Afterwards, he co-founded the media and technology focused investment firm WaterView Advisors in 1999.

Biondi was an avid tennis player and helped finance the creation of the Tennis Channel with fellow former Viacom CEOs Philippe Dauman and Thomas E. Dooley in 2001. Together they are known as the "Viacom mafia". At his summer residence in Martha's Vineyard, he was a board member for the Vineyard Family Tennis Foundation.

In the later part of his life, Biondi was a director of RealD, Amgen, Cablevision, Caesars Entertainment Corporation, Hasbro, Yahoo!, Viasat, and Seagate.

== Personal life ==
Biondi met Carol Oughton while working at the TelePrompTer Corporation. In 1974, the couple wed and together, they had two daughters, Anne Biondi Simonds and Jane Biondi Munna. His son-in-law is film producer and STX Entertainment head Robert Simonds, who Biondi served as a mentor to.

Biondi died from bladder cancer at his home in Los Angeles on November 25, 2019. He was 74 years old.
