= The Pink Panther (1963 film) =

1963 detective comedy film by Blake Edwards

- Theatrical release poster by Jack Rickard
- Directed by: Blake Edwards
- Written by: Maurice Richlin; Blake Edwards
- Produced by: Martin Jurow
- Starring: David Niven; Peter Sellers; Robert Wagner; Capucine; Brenda de Banzie; Colin Gordon; Fran Jeffries; Claudia Cardinale
- Cinematography: Philip Lathrop
- Edited by: Ralph E. Winters
- Music by: Henry Mancini
- Production companies: The Mirisch Company; Animation: DePatie–Freleng Enterprises
- Distributed by: United Artists
- Release dates: December 18, 1963 (Italy); March 18, 1964 (U.S.)
- Running time: 115 minutes
- Country: United States
- Language: English
- Box office: $10.9 million (US/Canada)

The Pink Panther is a 1963 American comedy film directed by Blake Edwards, who co-wrote the script with Maurice Richlin. Produced by The Mirisch Company and distributed by United Artists, it is the first installment in The Pink Panther franchise and stars an ensemble cast led by David Niven, Peter Sellers, Robert Wagner, Capucine, and Claudia Cardinale. The film follows Sir Charles Lytton, a notorious jewel thief known as "The Phantom", who plots to steal a priceless diamond known as "The Pink Panther" while being pursued by Inspector Jacques Clouseau.

The Pink Panther was initially released on December 18, 1963, in Italy followed by the United States release on March 18, 1964. It grossed $10.9 million in the United States and Canada, making it the ninth-highest grossing film of 1964. The film received mixed reviews from critics upon its release, but would later see a positive critical reappraisal. In 2010, the film was selected by the Library of Congress for preservation in the United States National Film Registry, as being "culturally, historically, and aesthetically significant".

== Plot ==
As a child in Lugash, Princess Dala receives a gift from her father, the Maharajah: the "Pink Panther", the largest diamond in the world. This huge pink gem has an unusual flaw: by looking deeply into the stone, one perceives a tiny discoloration resembling a leaping panther. Twenty years later, Dala has been forced into exile following her father's death and the subsequent military takeover of her country. The new government declares her precious diamond the property of the people and petitions the World Court to determine ownership. However, Dala refuses to relinquish it.

Dala goes on holiday at an exclusive ski resort in Cortina d'Ampezzo. Also staying there is English middle-aged playboy Sir Charles Lytton, who leads a secret life as a gentleman jewel thief called "the Phantom" and has his eyes on the Pink Panther. His brash American nephew George arrives at the resort unexpectedly. George is really a playboy drowning in gambling debts, but poses as a recent college graduate about to enter the Peace Corps so his uncle continues to support his lavish lifestyle.

On the Phantom's trail is French police detective Inspector Jacques Clouseau, whose wife Simone is having an affair with Sir Charles. She has become rich by acting as a fence for the Phantom under the nose of her amorous but oblivious husband. She dodges him while trying to avoid her lover's playboy nephew, who has decided to make the seductive older woman his latest conquest. Sir Charles has grown enamored of Dala and is ambivalent about carrying out the heist. The night before their departure, George accidentally learns of his uncle's criminal activities.

During a costume party at Dala's villa in Rome, Sir Charles and his nephew separately attempt to steal the diamond, only to find it already missing from the safe. The Inspector discovers both men at the crime scene. They escape during the confusion of the evening's climactic fireworks display. A frantic car chase through the streets of Rome ensues. Sir Charles and George are both arrested after all the vehicles collide with one another in the town square.

Later, Simone informs Dala that Sir Charles wished to call off the theft and asks her to help in his defense. Dala then reveals that she had hidden the diamond, knowing in advance from Clouseau of the planned theft. However, the Princess has fallen for Sir Charles and has a plan to save him and George from prison. At the trial, the defense calls as their sole witness, a surprised Inspector Clouseau. The barrister asks a series of questions that suggest Clouseau himself could be the Phantom. An unnerved Clouseau pulls out his handkerchief to wipe the perspiration from his brow, and the jewel drops from it.

As Clouseau is taken away to prison, he is mobbed by a throng of enamored women. Watching from a distance, Simone expresses regret, but Sir Charles reassures her that when the Phantom strikes again, Clouseau will be exonerated and plans the Phantom's next heist in South America. Meanwhile, on the way to prison, two Carabinieri express their envy that Clouseau is now desired by so many women. They ask him with obvious admiration how he committed all of those crimes; Clouseau considers his newfound fame and replies, "Well, you know... it wasn't easy."

The film ends after the police car carrying Clouseau to prison runs over a traffic warden: the cartoon Pink Panther from the animated opening credits. He gets back up, just as the police car crashes out of view, holding a card that reads "THEND" before he swipes the letters correctly to read "THE END".

== Cast ==
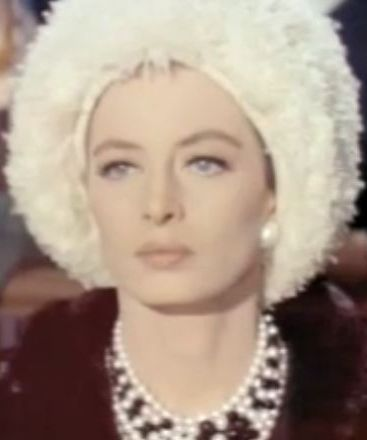
Capucine as Simone Clouseau

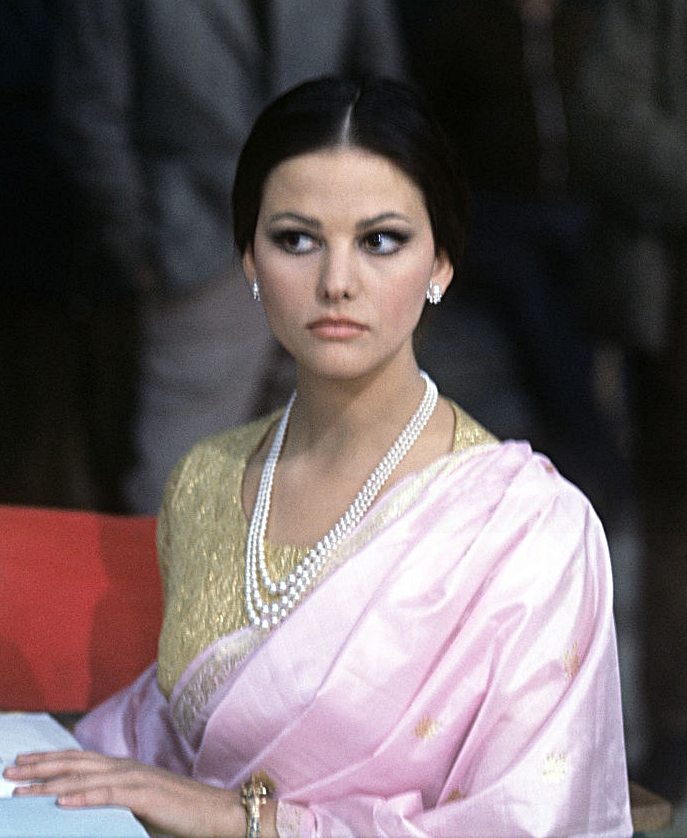
Claudia Cardinale as Princess Dala

- David Niven as Sir Charles Lytton
- Peter Sellers as Inspector Jacques Clouseau
- Robert Wagner as George Lytton, Sir Charles' nephew
- Capucine as Simone Clouseau, Inspector Clouseau's wife
- Brenda de Banzie as Angela Dunning
- Colin Gordon as Tucker
- John Le Mesurier as Defense attorney
- James Lanphier as Saloud
- Guy Thomajan as Artoff
- Michael Trubshawe as Felix Townes, novelist
- Riccardo Billi as Aristotle Sarajos, Greek shipowner
- Meri Welles as Monica Fawn, Hollywood starlet
- Martin Miller as Pierre Luigi, photographer
- Fran Jeffries as ski lodge singer
- Claudia Cardinale as Princess Dala
  - Gale Garnett dubbed Cardinale's dialogue (uncredited).

== Production ==
The film's theatrical trailer

The film was conceived as "a sophisticated comedy about a charming, urbane jewel thief, Sir Charles Lytton". Peter Ustinov was originally cast as Clouseau, with Ava Gardner as his wife. Janet Leigh turned down the lead female role, as it meant being away from the United States for too long. Audrey Hepburn, Nancy Kwan, and Cyd Charisse were considered to play as Princess Dala before Claudia Cardinale was hired in the role.

Production was originally scheduled to begin at Cinecittà Studios in Rome on November 5, 1962. After Gardner backed out in October 1962 because The Mirisch Company would not meet her demands for a personal staff, Ustinov also left the project, delaying the project for several weeks. Blake Edwards cast Sellers to replace Ustinov after meeting him while he was on a weekend vacation in Rome. He also hired Capucine to replace Gardner. The entire cast with the exception of Niven, Wagner, and Cardinale were subsequent recast as well to better fit Sellers and Capucine's new portrayals of their characters. The Mirisch Company subsequently sued Ustinov for $175,000 in damages for breach of contract.

Production finally began at Cinecittà several days after Sellers was cast on November 19, 1962. Filming also took place at the Italian Alpine resort of Cortina d'Ampezzo in January 1963. Principal photography concluded in March 1963 with several days of location shooting in Paris and Los Angeles. According to the DVD commentary by Blake Edwards, the chase scene at the piazza (filmed at Piazza della Repubblica in Rocca di Papa) was an homage to a similar sequence 26 minutes into Alfred Hitchcock's Foreign Correspondent (1940).

The film was initially intended as a vehicle for Niven, as evidenced by his top billing. As Edwards shot the film, employing multiple takes of improvised scenes, it became clear that Sellers, originally considered a supporting actor, was stealing the scenes. This resulted in his central role in all the film's sequels. When presenting at a subsequent Academy Awards ceremony, Niven requested his walk-on music be changed from the "Pink Panther" theme, stating, "That was not really my film."

Fran Jeffries sang the song "Meglio stasera (It Had Better Be Tonight)" in a scene set around the fireplace of a ski lodge. The song was composed by Henry Mancini, with English lyrics by Johnny Mercer and Italian lyrics by Franco Migliacci.

== Reception ==
The movie was a popular hit, earning estimated North American rentals of $6 million. The movie was shown at the Radio City Music Hall in the first United Artists premiere at a major cinema since 1950. Bosley Crowther of The New York Times wrote: "Seldom has any comedian seemed to work so persistently and hard at trying to be violently funny with weak material"; he called the script a "basically unoriginal and largely witless piece of farce carpentry that has to be pushed and heaved at stoutly in order to keep on the move." Variety was much more positive, calling the film "intensely funny" and "Sellers' razor-sharp timing... superlative." In a 2004 review of The Pink Panther Film Collection, a DVD collection that included The Pink Panther, The A.V. Club wrote:

Because the later movies were identified so closely with Clouseau, it's easy to forget that he was merely one in an ensemble at first, sharing screen time with Niven, Capucine, Robert Wagner and Claudia Cardinale. If not for Sellers' hilarious pratfalls, The Pink Panther could be mistaken for a luxuriant caper movie like Topkapi ... which is precisely what makes the movie so funny. It acts as the straight man, while Sellers gets to play mischief-maker.

The film holds an approval rating of 89% on the review aggregator site Rotten Tomatoes based on 37 reviews, with an average rating of 7.4/10. The website's critical consensus says, "Peter Sellers is at his virtuosically bumbling best in The Pink Panther, a sophisticated caper blessed with an unforgettably slinky score by Henry Mancini." The American Film Institute listed The Pink Panther as No. 20 in its 100 Years of Film Scores.

== Soundtrack ==
The soundtrack album for the film, featuring Henry Mancini's score, was released in 1964 by RCA Victor and reached No. 8 on the Billboard magazine's pop album chart. The album was nominated for Grammy and Academy Awards and was later inducted into the Grammy Hall of Fame and selected by the American Film Institute as one of the greatest film scores.

== See also ==
- List of American films of 1963
- The Pink Panther (series)
