= Lance Richlin =

American painter

Lance Richlin (born 1961) is a classical realist painter and a sculptor based in Torrance, California. His oil painting technique is an alla prima technique that requires the paint not to dry until completion.

Lance was asked to write an instructional article on figure drawings in the March 2008 issue of American Artist Magazine.

He has written a book Drawing Made Easy: Discover Your Inner Artist as You Learn to Draw Portraits in Graphite, published by Walter Foster.

In 2010, he was published as a featured artist in Bluecanvas Magazine Issue Four.

He appeared in a skit that aired on Jimmy Kimmel Live! (2007) where Aunt Chippy and Uncle Frank receive drawing lessons in his studio.

Lance Richlin has lectured and taught at Art Center College of Design in Pasadena, Otis College of Art and Design in Los Angeles, The Associates in Arts School in Sherman Oaks, California Institute of the Arts in Valencia and Laguna College of Art and Design in Laguna Beach.

Lance's work is in the collection of:

- Grady Harp, owner of Lizardi / Harp Gallery
- John Pence, owner of John Pence Gallery
- Victor Chaltiel, former CEO Baxter Industries
- Milton Schwartz, CEO Checker Cab
- Stanley Fishfader, former owner, Coordinated Equipment
- Anthony Newley, entertainer
- Dom DeLuise, entertainer

Richlin's father is the scriptwriter Maurice Richlin.
