= The Lionhearts =

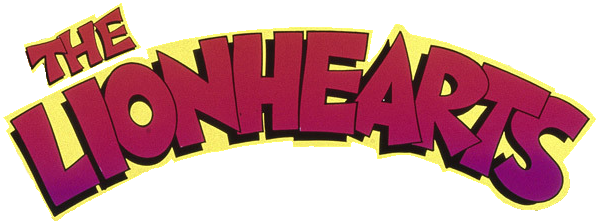
- Genre: Animated sitcom
- Created by: Byron Vaughns
- Written by: Ruth Bennett; Greg Antonacci; Mark Bennett; Richard Gitelson; Joanne Pagliaro; Bill Braunstein; Peter Hunziker
- Directed by: Byron Vaughns
- Voices of: William H. Macy; Peri Gilpin; Natasha Slayton; Cameron Finley; Nicolette Little; Harve Presnell
- Theme music composer: Mark Watters; Lorraine Feather
- Opening theme: "Roar", performed by Randy Crenshaw
- Composer: Mark Watters
- Country of origin: United States
- Original language: English
- No. of seasons: 1
- No. of episodes: 13

Production
- Executive producers: Paul Sabella; Jonathan Dern; Ruth Bennett
- Producer: Byron Vaughns
- Running time: 22 minutes
- Production company: Metro-Goldwyn-Mayer Animation

Original release
- Network: Syndication
- Release: September 19 – December 12, 1998

The Lionhearts is an American animated television series from MGM that aired on Saturday and Sunday mornings in syndication from September 19 to December 12, 1998. The series aired on syndication in the United States and was also seen in Australia and Latin America (translated into Spanish as Los Corazón de León). The Lionhearts was one of the last television series produced by Metro-Goldwyn-Mayer Animation and distributed by Claster Television Incorporated.

== Plot ==
The Lionhearts focuses on the behind the scenes life of MGM's mascot, Leo Lionheart, and his family. The series shows the Lionhearts living in a normal house and living a normal life just like non-celebrity families. Most of the members of the family are named after famous MGM movie stars. The characters first appeared on a series of Sing-Along children's videos released by MGM in 1997. The original character designs (especially those of Spencer and Kate) were greatly modified for the TV series. Ashley Tisdale provided the voice of Kate in the Sing-Along videos, while Charles Rocket was the voice of Leo, Lana was voiced by Debra Jo Rupp and Chris Marquette did the voice of Spencer .

== Characters ==
=== Lionheart Family ===
- Leo Lionheart Jr. (voiced by: William H. Macy in the TV series, Charles Rocket in the "MGM Sing-Along" videos): Leo is the father, husband and provider of the family. He is 37 years old and works as the mascot for MGM's movies, a role which was passed onto him by his own father Leo Sr. One of Leo's favorite things to do when he gets the chance is to nap. In the TV series, he wore a blue sweater. In the "MGM Sing-Alongs" videos, he was typically naked, but sometimes wore a gray shirt, a black trenchcoat and hat when going to or leaving work.
- Lana Lionheart (voiced by: Peri Gilpin in the TV series, Debra Jo Rupp in the "MGM Sing-Along" videos): Lana is the mother and wife of the family, she is also the glue that keeps the family from falling apart. She used to work as an acrobat in the circus, but ever since she became a mother it seems she became a stay at home mother. She is 33 years old. She was named after Lana Turner. In the TV series, she had short red hair and wore a magenta long-sleeved blouse and cyan pants. In the "MGM Sing-Alongs" videos, she wore a purple dress that varied between long-sleeved, short-sleeved and sleeveless. She also happens to have an older brother named Marvin who also works in the circus.
- Kate Lionheart (voiced by: Natasha Slayton in the TV Series, Ashley Tisdale in the "MGM Sing-Along" videos): Kate is the oldest of the three children Leo and Lana have, she's 10 years old. She likes to e-mail, talk to her friends, ride horses and go to school. Kate is very tolerant of her siblings, and a very polite girl overall. Kate is named after Katharine Hepburn. In the TV series, she had red hair in a ponytail and wore a pink t-shirt with a red heart in the center, dark pink pants, and teal sneakers. In the "MGM Sing-Alongs" videos, she was much younger, had glasses and short hair, wore a blue dress with white polka dots and was barefoot. She also plays keyboards, especially in the show's intro. Unlike her younger siblings, she finds her mother's circus past embarrassing.
- Spencer Lionheart (voiced by: Cameron Finley in the TV series, Chris Marquette in the "MGM Sing-Along" videos): Spencer is the middle of the three children, he's 8 years old. His dreams are to one day be a big-time rock n' roll star, he plays either an electric guitar or an electric bass guitar and also does sing, but not to everyone's pleasure, especially not to his sister Kate's. While being an overall acceptable guitarist, he, unlike Kate, is a terrible singer. One of his major flaws at times is he doesn't finish what he starts. He takes his name from Spencer Tracy. In the TV series, he had auburn hair with sideburns, freckles and wore a red tank-top with a "4" in the center, blue jeans, and black-and-white sneakers. In the "MGM Sing-Alongs", he was much younger, was shirtless, wore red shorts, and his shoes were green-and-white.
- Judy Lionheart (voiced by: Nicolette Little in the TV series, Kylie Erica Mar in the "MGM Sing-Along" videos): Judy is the youngest of the children, she's 4 years old. She is very curious and loves to play. She also looks up to her sister Kate as her heroine. Judy is named after Judy Garland. In the TV show, she wore pink overalls. In the "MGM Sing-Alongs" videos, she was more of a toddler and wore a pink shirt.
- Leo Lionheart Sr. (voiced by Harve Presnell): The grandfather of Kate, Spencer, and Judy, who is also Leo Lionheart's widowed father and in his 70's. He has relations to the titular characters of the Tom and Jerry series. He demands his son to be less humble and act more like a star and the center of attention, which Leo Jr. has problems with. As an example, he does demand Leo Jr. to have someone to open the door for him. He was shorter, had less mane, and had a floppy mouth in "Family Circus" but his design changed in "No Place Like Home".

=== Humans ===
- Director (voiced by Joe Pantoliano): A director who works with Leo at MGM Studios.
- Dorothy (voiced by Betty White): Leo's makeup artist who can't see very well.
- Freddy (voiced by Wallace Shawn): Leo's talent agent.
- Hank (voiced by Jeffrey Tambor): MGM's president.
- Jennings (voiced by Michael Jackson): Grandpa Leo's chauffeur who drives the limo. Like Dorothy, he has a terrible vision and causes multiple crashes.

Guest stars included Tom Kenny, Carlos Alazraqui, Justin Shenkarow, Edie McClurg, Clancy Brown, Tom Arnold, Karl Malden, Ben Stein, Craig Ferguson, and Kathy Ireland.

== Production ==
The series was announced in 1997, the brainchild of John Symes, then president of MGM Worldwide TV Group. MGM Animation signed actors William H. Macy, Peri Gilpin, Jeffrey Tambor, and Betty White, among others, to provide voices producing 13 half-hour episodes of The Lionhearts, set for a September 1998 bow in syndication. MGM Animation tapped sitcom scribe Ruth Bennett as exec producer and head writer for the series.

== Episodes ==
No.	Title	Written by	Original release date
1	"Family Circus"	Ruth Bennett	September 19, 1998
Kate and Spencer are not enjoying their weekend with their parents. Advice from Leo's father helps him sort out their troubles to make their weekend fun.
2	"Survive"	Rick Gitelson	September 26, 1998
Leo takes his family out camping in Dirk Flannery's Sharkmobile, but get locked outside the car, forcing them to use some survival skills for a camp out.
3	"But Some of My Best Friends are Clowns"	Greg Antonacci	October 3, 1998
Leo's relaxation time is interrupted by the arrival of Lana's clown friends. Then Leo tries to convince his clown-hating neighbors to respect them.
4	"No Place Like Home"	Peter Hunziker	October 10, 1998
5	"Singin' in the Mane"	Joanne Pagliaro	October 17, 1998
A remark from Hank leads Leo to believe that he is starting to lose his mane with age. Spencer tries to convince Kate to help him join the school chorus, who are getting tickets to see his favorite rock band, Isaac Iceberg and the Titanics.
6	"The Poem"	Joanne Pagliaro	October 24, 1998
Kate must write the perfect poem to be the best and smartest student in the class, but she loses it accidentally after it turns out to be one of Spencer's songs, and Kate has to confess the truth about her missing poem.
7	"Greta Garbo Ears"	Ruth Bennett	October 31, 1998
8	"The Treehouse"	Bill Braunstein	November 7, 1998
9	"Brown Dog Day"	Greg Antonacci	November 14, 1998
10	"Leo's Diet"	Rick Gitelson	November 21, 1998
Leo must lose 10 pounds and remove a piece of his gray mane in order to prevent Leonardo Bartholomew, MGM's hottest actor, from taking his place for MGM's 75th anniversary gala.
11	"The Pony Show"	Ruth Bennett	November 28, 1998
12	"Don't Bug the Neighbors (Part 1)"	Story by : Mark Bennett; Teleplay by : Ruth Bennett	December 5, 1998
13	"Don't Bug the Neighbors (Part 2)"	Story by : Mark Bennett; Teleplay by : Ruth Bennett	December 12, 1998
