= The Pink Panther (2006 film) =

2006 film by Shawn Levy

- Theatrical release poster
- Directed by: Shawn Levy
- Screenplay by: Len Blum; Steve Martin
- Story by: Len Blum; Michael Saltzman
- Based on: The Pink Panther films by Blake Edwards
- Produced by: Robert Simonds
- Starring: Steve Martin; Kevin Kline; Jean Reno; Emily Mortimer; Henry Czerny; Beyoncé Knowles
- Cinematography: Jonathan Brown
- Edited by: George Folsey Jr.; Brad E. Wilhite
- Music by: Christophe Beck; Henry Mancini (Theme)
- Production companies: Metro-Goldwyn-Mayer Pictures; Columbia Pictures; Robert Simonds Productions
- Distributed by: Sony Pictures Releasing (United States and Canada); 20th Century Fox (International)
- Release dates: January 19, 2006 (Alpe d'Huez); February 10, 2006 (United States)
- Running time: 93 minutes
- Country: United States
- Language: English
- Budget: $80 million
- Box office: $164.1 million

The Pink Panther is a 2006 American comedy-mystery film directed by Shawn Levy and written by Len Blum and Steve Martin. It is a reboot of The Pink Panther franchise, and is the tenth installment in the series. The film stars Martin in the lead role and co-stars Kevin Kline, Jean Reno, Emily Mortimer, Henry Czerny, and Beyoncé Knowles. In the film, Inspector Jacques Clouseau is assigned to solve the murder of a famous soccer coach and the theft of the famous Pink Panther diamond.

The Pink Panther premiered in Alpe d'Huez on January 19, 2006, and was released theatrically in United States on February 10, by Sony Pictures Releasing. The film received mostly negative reviews, but was a limited commercial success, grossing $164.1 million worldwide against an $80 million budget. A sequel, The Pink Panther 2, was released in 2009.

== Plot ==
At a football match between France and China, the French coach Yves Gluant arrives wearing the priceless Pink Panther diamond ring and embraces his girlfriend, pop star Xania. After France wins in sudden death, Gluant is killed by a poison dart, with the Pink Panther diamond nowhere to be found.

Eager to win the Légion d'honneur, Chief Inspector Charles Dreyfus promotes clumsy policeman and village idiot Jacques Clouseau to the rank of inspector and assigns him to the case. While Clouseau draws the media's attention, Dreyfus assembles a secret team to crack the case and assigns Gendarme Gilbert Ponton to keep an eye on Clouseau. Clouseau befriends Ponton and falls in love with secretary Nicole Durant.

Although Clouseau makes little progress in the case, due to his incompetence, he discovers that many people hated Gluant and even wanted to kill him. Bizu, a French player who blamed Gluant for "stealing away" Xania, is the prime murder suspect until he is shot in the head in the football team's changing room. While gathering information at a casino, Clouseau meets MI6 006 agent Nigel Boswell, who foils a robbery, orchestrated by the notorious Gas Mask Bandits while wearing Clouseau's trench coat; Clouseau mistakenly receives credit (as Nigel was not supposed to be present) and is nominated for the Légion d'honneur, angering Dreyfus and ruining his chance to be honoured.

After following Xania to New York City, Ponton insists she is a suspect because Gluant cheated on her, but Clouseau believes she is innocent; though her actions cause him to believe she knows more than she is letting on. The poison that killed Gluant is found to have been derived from Chinese herbs, leading Dreyfus to conclude that the killer is a Chinese envoy named Dr. Pang, whom Gluant had several dealings with. Dreyfus has Clouseau's bag swapped for one full of weapons at the airport, and Clouseau is arrested (primarily due to his inability to say "hamburger" correctly, having attempted to smuggle some onto the flight back) and vilified by the press on his return to France. Dreyfus demotes Clouseau, revealing the truth about why he promoted him in the first place, and plots to publicly arrest Dr. Pang at the Presidential Ball, where Xania will perform.

Clouseau reads an article online about his arrest and notices something strange in the photograph from which he deduces that Gluant and Bizu were killed by the same person. Deducing also that Xania will be the killer's next target, Clouseau, Ponton, and Nicole hurry to the Élysée Palace and sneak into the Presidential Ball. While Dreyfus errantly arrests Dr. Pang, Clouseau and Ponton save Xania's life by capturing her would-be assassin: Yuri, the Russian trainer for the French football team. Jealous and feeling overlooked for the team's success, Yuri used his mandated knowledge of Chinese herbs to kill Gluant; he jabbed the dart unseen into Gluant's neck during their celebration, making it look like Gluant had been shot with it. He later killed Bizu, who long suspected that Yuri might try to kill Gluant and attempted to blackmail him, by using his Russian army training to target the player's occipital lobe, and then targeted Xania for ignoring him and dating Gluant; making clear that the Pink Panther wasn't the primary target all along, but a fit of jealousy.

Clouseau reveals that the Pink Panther was not stolen but instead sewn into the lining of Xania's purse; the photograph of Clouseau's arrest showed an X-ray of the purse going through airport security. Xania confesses that Gluant gave her the diamond as an engagement ring just before the France-China match, but following his sudden death, she kept it hidden thinking that if she came forward with the ring, everyone would think she was the killer. Clouseau concludes that Xania is the diamond's rightful owner, and Yuri is taken into custody.

Clouseau wins the Légion d'honneur which disappoints Dreyfus. Leaving the ceremony, Dreyfus' suit accidentally gets caught in Clouseau's car door, causing Dreyfus to be dragged down the street as an oblivious Clouseau drives away. While visiting a gravely injured Dreyfus in the hospital, Clouseau accidentally releases the brake on Dreyfus' bed, which rolls through the hospital and crashes through a window, throwing him down into the Seine as he curses out Clouseau, while Clouseau, Ponton, and Nicole watch from indoors.

== Cast ==
- Steve Martin as Inspector Jacques Clouseau, a bumbling police officer from a small village in France, assigned to bring Yves Gluant's murderer to justice and recover the Pink Panther diamond
- Kevin Kline as Chief Inspector Charles Dreyfus, the head of the French police who is obsessed with winning the Medal of Honour, and means to use Clouseau and the Pink Panther case to win it
- Jean Reno as Gendarme Gilbert Ponton, a capable police officer who is assigned to report to Dreyfus on Clouseau's actions
- Emily Mortimer as Nicole Durant, a secretary and romantic interest of Clouseau
- Henry Czerny as Yuri, a Russian trainer for the France national football team
- Kristin Chenoweth as Cherie, an American employee of the France national football team
- Roger Rees as Raymond Laroque, a wealthy casino owner and friend of Yves Gluant
- Beyoncé Knowles as Xania, a famous pop star and girlfriend of Gluant
- William Abadie as Bizu, a star player on the France national football team and Xania's ex
- Scott Adkins as Jacquard, another player on the France national football team
- Philip Goodwin as Deputy Chief Renard
- Henri Garcin as President
- Jean Dell as Justice Minister Clochard
- Anna Katarina as Agent Corbeille
- Jason Statham as Yves Gluant (uncredited), the head coach of the France national football team, whose murder and vanishing of his Pink Panther diamond serve as the main conflicts of the plot
- Clive Owen as Nigel Boswell/Agent 006 (uncredited), an MI6 secret agent who briefly helps Clouseau
- Boris McGiver as Vainqueur (uncredited), the current head coach of the France national football team who takes over after the murder of Gluant
- Sally Leung Bayer as Yu, a Chinese Emigrant who was interrogated by Clouseau and revealed information involving Chinese herbs

== Production ==
Chris Tucker and Mike Myers were considered for the role of Inspector Jacques Clouseau. A collaboration between Steve Martin and producer Robert Simonds, who had worked together on Cheaper by the Dozen, The Pink Panther had a production budget of US$80 million. Filming began on May 10, 2004.

The film was originally supposed to seek an August 5, 2005 release date under MGM Distribution Co., but it was delayed and pushed back to February 10, 2006, after Sony expressed dissatisfaction with the film's raunchy tone. It was heavily edited and key scenes were re-shot in an effort to create a more family-friendly feature. "With the recent acquisition of MGM, we wanted to give our marketing department the time and opportunity to launch this very important franchise," Sony Pictures Releasing president Rory Bruer said. "We've seen the movie, and we really love this film. It's a franchise we believe in and are really excited about, and Steve Martin is great as Clouseau."

As per tradition of the original Pink Panther films, animated opening titles are featured, provided by Kurtz & Friends.

== Reception ==
=== Box office ===
The Pink Panther grossed $82.2 million in the United States and Canada and $81.8 million in other territories, for a worldwide total of $164.1 million.

The Pink Panther opened at No.1 in the United States, grossing $20.2 million from 3,477 theaters, and took in an additional $20.9 million over the four day Presidents Day weekend the following weekend. The film closed in theatres on April 16, having grossed $82.2 million in its ten weeks of release. Overseas, the film took $76.6 million. United States screenings made up 51.8% of box office takings, with international viewings responsible for 48.2%. In the United Kingdom, the film was released on March 17, 2006, and topped the country's box office that weekend.

=== Critical response ===
On Rotten Tomatoes, The Pink Panther has an approval rating of 21% based on 143 reviews and an average rating of 4.1/10. The site's critical consensus reads: "Though Steve Martin is game, the particulars of the Inspector Clouseau character elude him in this middling update." On Metacritic, the film has a weighted average score of 38 out of 100 based on 35 critics, indicating "generally unfavorable reviews". Audiences polled by CinemaScore gave the film an average grade of "B" on an A+ to F scale.

Roger Ebert of The Chicago Sun-Times gave the film a largely negative review and 1.5 stars out of 4. While Martin had demonstrated considerable comedic talent in other roles, Ebert felt he was not well-cast as Clouseau: "the character [of Clouseau] isn't bigger than the actor, as Batman and maybe James Bond are", Ebert wrote, and "at every moment in the movie, I was aware that Peter Sellers was Clouseau, and Steve Martin was not."

=== Accolades ===
The film was nominated for two Razzies in 2006, one in the category "Worst Remake or Rip-off", and one in the category "Worst Supporting Actress" for Kristin Chenoweth. At the 2006 Stinkers Bad Movie Awards, the film received four nominations: "Worst Actor" (Martin), "Worst Song" (Check on It), and "Worst Fake Accent (Male)" (both Martin and Kline).

== Home media ==
The Pink Panther was released on DVD on June 13, 2006, by Sony Pictures Home Entertainment and sold 693,588 DVD copies, worth $9,391,182. To date, the film has sold 1,579,116 copies—$23,216,770 of consumer spending. It was later released on Blu-ray on January 20, 2009.

== Music ==
David Newman was originally chosen to compose the score for the film, but was quickly replaced by Christophe Beck. He is credited with the film score which was released as the soundtrack album The Pink Panther about one month following the release of the film. R&B singer, Beyoncé, who co-stars as Xania, performed two songs for the film, "A Woman Like Me" and #1 hit, "Check on It". The latter serves as the film's theme song aside from the Pink Panther theme by Henry Mancini.

Numerous other songs were used in small parts, but only Beck's original score was included on the soundtrack album.

== Legacy ==
=== Sequel ===
The sequel to the film, titled The Pink Panther 2, was released on February 6, 2009. Martin, Mortimer, and Reno reprised their roles as Inspector Clouseau, Nicole, and Ponton respectively, while John Cleese replaced Kline as Chief Inspector Dreyfus; other new additions to the cast included Andy Garcia, Alfred Molina, Lily Tomlin, Aishwarya Rai Bachchan and Jeremy Irons. The film received worse reviews than its predecessor and was a commercial failure, grossing only $75.9 million worldwide.

=== Second reboot ===
On November 19, 2020, Metro-Goldwyn-Mayer (MGM) announced that a new Pink Panther film is in the works with Sonic the Hedgehog director Jeff Fowler attached to direct and Chris Bremner attached to write the script. Unlike the previous films which only focused on Inspector Clouseau, the new film will focus on both Clouseau and the animated Pink Panther cartoon character. By April 2023, it was announced that after acquiring MGM, Amazon is developing new additions to the franchise in the form of a movie and television series through their subsidiary Amazon Studios (now called Amazon MGM Studios). It was later reported that Eddie Murphy was in talks to star in the film as Clouseau. As of 2026, the film is still in development and no news has been heard on it since then.

== See also ==
- List of The Pink Panther cartoons
- List of live-action films based on cartoons and comics
