= Fran Jeffries =

American singer, dancer, actress (1937–2016)

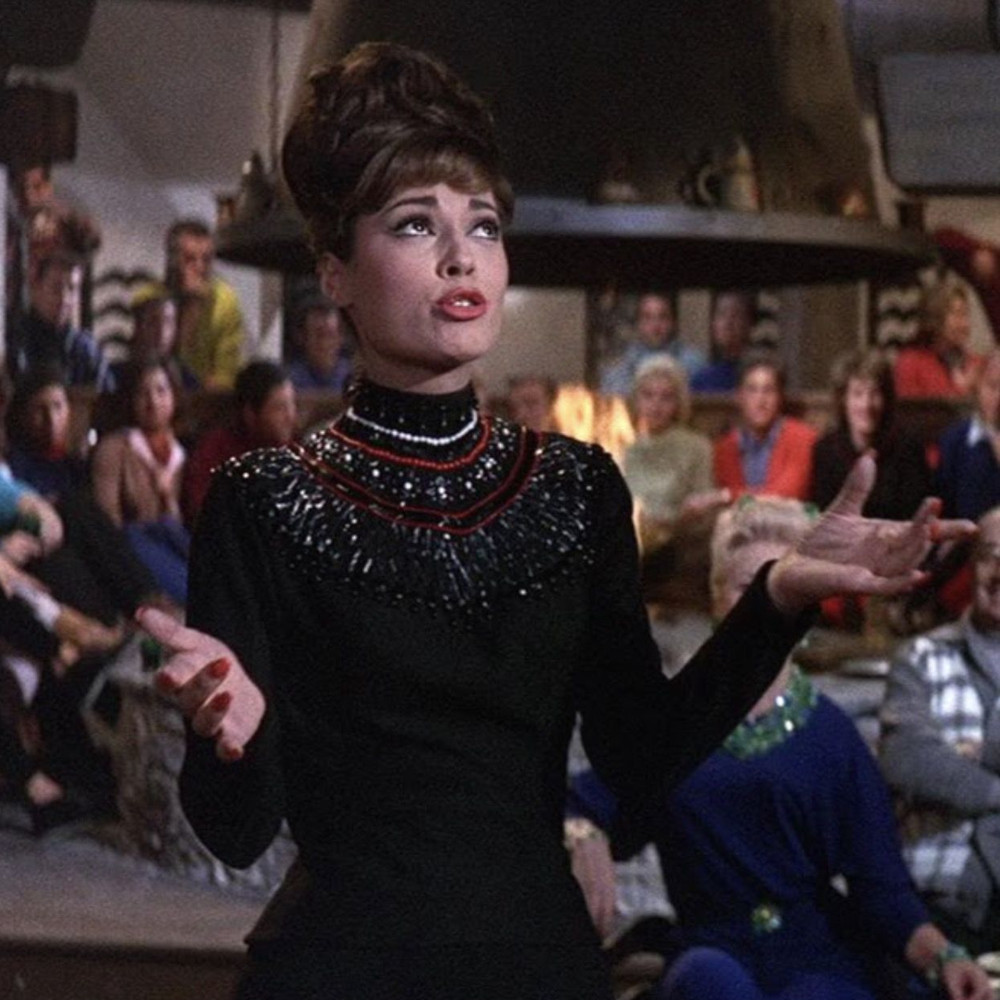
- Jeffries in The Pink Panther (1963)
- Born: Frances Ann Makris; May 18, 1937; Palo Alto, California U.S.
- Died: December 15, 2016 (aged 79); Los Angeles, California U.S.
- Resting place: Hollywood Forever Cemetery
- Years active: 1958–2000
- Spouses: Edward Emile “Eddie” Belasco Jr. (divorced); Dick Haymes (m. 1958; div. 1965); Richard Quine (m. 1965; div. 1970); Steven Schaeffer (m. 1971; div. 1973)
- Children: 1

Fran Jeffries (born Frances Ann Makris; May 18, 1937 – December 15, 2016) was an American singer, dancer, actress, and model.

== Early life ==
Jeffries was born Frances Ann Makris on May 18, 1937, in Palo Alto, California, the daughter of Esther A. (née Gautier) and Steven G. Makris, a Greek-immigrant barbershop owner. When she was young, her father moved the family to San Jose to open a restaurant.

== Career ==
Jeffries sang with Bob Scobey's orchestra for a year. While she was married to Dick Haymes, they had a nightclub act together. During this time, Haymes asked songwriter-pianist Dave Frishberg to "write something for Fran -- a cute, sexy piece," which became Frishberg's classic song "Peel Me a Grape."

Jeffries's film debut came in the 1958 film The Buccaneer. She appeared in the 1963 film The Pink Panther, in which she sang "Meglio Stasera (It Had Better Be Tonight)" while leading a line-dance with Peter Sellers, David Niven, and others. Her supporting role as a professional entertainer in Sex and the Single Girl featured her as a singer-dancer.

Her last film role was in A Talent for Loving, directed by then-husband Richard Quine. On set, "the Quines were constantly quarreling," according to writer Anne Edwards, who was married to one of the producers. "Fran Jeffries was a singer, not an actress, and did not like her role, especially the scarcity of her scenes. By the end of shooting, she had filed for divorce."

Jeffries sang on The Tom Jones Show in 1969 with the host, doing a duet of "You've Got What it Takes," as well as The Smokey Robinson Show the following year, in which she did solo numbers as well as a duet with Smokey Robinson and Stevie Wonder and the rest of the cast. Jeffries also performed on Bob Hope's final USO tour of Vietnam in December 1972.

She was featured in Playboy in the February 1971 issue (Volume 18 Number 2) at the age of 33 in a pictorial titled "Fran-tastic!" In September 1982 she posed a second time for Playboy, this time at the age of 45. This second pictorial (Volume 29 Number 9) was titled "Still Fran-tastic!"

== Personal life ==
Jeffries had a daughter with second husband Dick Haymes (1958–1965). She was then married to director Richard Quine (1965–1970) and Steven Schaeffer (1971–1973).

== Death ==
Jeffries died from multiple myeloma on December 15, 2016, in Los Angeles, California, at the age of 79.

== Filmography ==
Year	Title	Role	Notes
1958	The Buccaneer	Cariba – Mawbee Girl	
1963	The Pink Panther	Greek "cousin"	
1964	Sex and the Single Girl	Gretchen	
1965	Harum Scarum	Aishah	
1969	A Talent for Loving	Maria	

== Discography ==
"Sex and the Single Girl" was released on MGM in 1964 as a single and an LP. She also sang the songs "Meglio Stasera" and "The Anniversary Song" in films. In 1966, Jeffries recorded an album for Monument Records entitled This Is Fran Jeffries, which was a collection of standards and popular songs, produced by Fred Foster with arrangements by Dick Grove and Bill Justis, including a rendition of Lennon–McCartney's "Yesterday". In 2000, she released a recording All the Love, again a collection of standards.

=== Albums ===
Recorded	Title	Label	Catalogue No.	Format
1960	Fran Can Really Hang You Up the Most	Warwick	W2020	LP/CD
1964	Fran Jeffries Sings of Sex and the Single Girl	MGM Records	SE-4268	LP/CD
1966	This Is Fran Jeffries	Monument Records	SLP-18069	LP/CD
2000	All the Love	Varèse Sarabande	302 066 187 2	CD

=== Singles ===
Recorded	Title	Label	Catalogue No.	Format
1964	"Sex and the Single Girl?"	MGM Records		45 r.p.m.
1966	"Take Me" ("Tutta La Gente Del Mondo")/"Honey and Wine"	Monument	45-1036	
1967	"Life Goes On"/"My Lonely Corner"		45-1015	
1968	"Gone Now/"I've Been Wrong Before"		45-1089	
