= A Woman Like Me (song) =

Song by Beyoncé

from the album The Pink Panther soundtrack
- Released: February 2006
- Genre: R&B
- Length: 4:16
- Songwriters: Charmelle Cofield; Ron "Amen-Ra" Lawrence; Beyoncé
- Producers: Ron "Amen-Ra" Lawrence; Beyoncé

"A Woman Like Me" is a song recorded by American recording artist Beyoncé, originally written for and performed in the 2006 film The Pink Panther. It was written by Charmelle Cofield, Ron "AMEN-RA" Lawrence, and Beyoncé and produced by the latter two. It was recorded using multitrack recording where Beyoncé harmonized with herself several times over. "A Woman Like Me" is a moderate R&B song which samples the horn arrangement from Simon Haseley's orchestral library music "Hammerhead", and strings and drums from his "Great Day".

A performance video of the song appeared shortly on the film and the whole performance was included on the film's DVD. It peaked at number three on the US Bubbling Under R&B/Hip-Hop Singles chart following its release due to digital sales. The song was remixed by Steve Austin and S-ROC on their respective albums.

== Background and composition ==
"A Woman Like Me" was written by Charmelle Cofield, Ron "AMEN-RA" Lawrence, and Beyoncé and produced by the latter two. It is performed in the 2006 film The Pink Panther in which Beyoncé stars as Xania. It was originally recorded for the soundtrack album for The Pink Panther but was eventually not used like Beyoncé's other song "Check on It". The song was initially written by the people involved in the film; however Beyoncé partially rewrote some of the lyrics and its melodies and sent "A Woman Like Me" to her team who had to redo it. During an interview, Beyoncé said, "It had the strength of a Tina Turner song but the drama of a Bond tune. ... It definitely fit[s] the character. She's talking a lot of noise in stuff like 'Do you think you can handle a woman like me? Xania is like that." It was recorded in New York City using multitrack recording where Beyoncé harmonized with herself several times over. Although the song was never released on an album or as a single, it was later remixed by Steve Austin in the album Hollywood Cole Presents: I'm the Juggernaut Bitch!.

"A Woman Like Me" samples the horn arrangement from Simon Haseley's "Hammerhead" (1972). According to the sheet music published at Musicnotes.com by Hal Leonard Corporation, "A Woman Like Me" is a moderate R&B song pacing in common time of 80 BPM. Beyoncé's vocals range from the low musical note of A_{b3} to the high note of E_{b5} throughout the song. On May 12, 2008, S-ROC included a remix of the song as the eleventh track on his 2008 album Roc and a Hard Place. American hip hop recording artist Ab-Soul sampled "A Woman Like Me" on his song "Still a Regular Nigga", taken from his mixtape Longterm 2: Lifestyles of the Broke and Almost Famous (2010).

== Reception ==
During a review of the film's DVD, Damon Smith of the UK-based newspaper Manchester Evening News described the song as "sultry". Writing for the American Jet magazine, Andrew Schwartz felt that the character Beyoncé portrayed sang an "iconic song", referring to "A Woman Like Me". He further noted the track was a "unique collaboration" between Beyoncé and the director of the movie, Shawn Levy, saying that it reflects the singer's "style and taste". For the chart issue dated July 1, 2006, "A Woman Like Me" peaked at number three on the US Billboard Bubbling Under R&B/Hip-Hop Singles which acts as a twenty five song extension to the Hot R&B/Hip-Hop Songs chart.

== Music video ==
The DVD version of the film includes an exclusive complete performance of the song in the special features. The video shows Beyoncé, as Xania, in two scenes of the film singing on a small stage with two back-up dancers. The entire video is set to look like Beyoncé is performing the song with no microphone. Three different shots were used from five takes for the visual performance of the song in the film. The video is only briefly shown in the film The Pink Panther as part of a scene and was officially fully released after the DVD release. Phil Bacharach of the website DVD Talk wrote that "The lovely Beyoncé takes center stage in two bonus features" in the film, referring to the music video of "Check on It" and the performance of "A Woman Like Me". He further described the video of the performance of the song as "more interesting" than the music video for "Check on It" which was also included.

== Charts ==
2006 weekly chart performance for "A Woman Like Me"
| Chart (2006) | Peak position |
|---|---|
| US Bubbling Under R&B/Hip-Hop Singles (Billboard) | 3 |
