= It Had Better Be Tonight (Meglio stasera) =

1963 song

"Meglio stasera"

Song
- Language: Italian
- English title: It Had Better Be Tonight
- Published: 1963 by Northridge Music
- Composer: Henry Mancini
- Lyricists: Franco Migliacci (Italian); Johnny Mercer (English

"Meglio stasera" (known in English as "It Had Better Be Tonight") is a 1963 song in bossa nova rhythm with music by Henry Mancini, Italian lyrics by Franco Migliacci and English lyrics by Johnny Mercer. It was composed for the 1963 film The Pink Panther, in which it was performed by Fran Jeffries. In addition to the vocal performance, instrumental portions of the song appear in the film's underscore, sometimes as an introduction to the main "Pink Panther Theme".

== Lyrics and translation ==
The beginning of the song, in the original Italian, is here followed by a literal translation and the first two lines of the English version which contains an Italian expression, "Fa' subito!", which translates as "do it right away", but which does not appear in the Italian lyrics. However, all the versions carry the same underlying meaning of "Let's make love tonight, because who knows what will happen tomorrow."

Italian version

Meglio stasera, che domani o mai,
Domani chi lo sa, quel che sarà?

Literal translation of the Italian version

Better tonight, than tomorrow or never,
Tomorrow who knows, what will be?

English version

Meglio stasera, baby, go-go-go,
Or as we natives say, "Fa' subito!"

Spanish version

Mejor ahora, ya mañana no,
Si quieres ser mi amor decídelo.

== Other versions ==
Dressed in a black cat-suit and singing in Italian, [Jeffries] slithered her way around an Alpine ski chalet performing... "Meglio Stasera" ... as the bewitched cast looked on.

— New York Times, 2016

The song has been recorded in a number of versions. The Italian version performed by Fran Jeffries appears in the film, but not on the soundtrack album. An instrumental that resembles the underscore of Jeffries' version is included on the soundtrack album, as is a group vocal with only vaguely related English lyrics (which can be heard in the film during the fancy-dress ball and costume party whilst the attempted robbery is taking place). Another Italian version, arranged by Ennio Morricone and performed by Miranda Martino, in 1963, appears on the compilation album Da Hollywood a Cinecittà. Morricone later also did an instrumental version on compilation albums. Another version appears in another Sellers, Blake Edwards & Mancini collaboration, the 1968 film The Party. Other singers to subsequently record the song include Sarah Vaughan, on her 1965 album Sarah Vaughan Sings the Mancini Songbook, and Lena Horne. An instrumental lounge-style version was recorded by The Hub Kings on their album This Way. John Barrowman performed the song during his 2008 tour. Accordionist Frank Marocco recorded the song together with "Quando, quando, quando", as part of a two-song medley on his compilation album Beyond the Sea. His arrangement appears in one of his sheet-music book combinations, titled Latin Rhythms. A Chill-style remake of this song was done by Italian group Mondo Candido. It appears on the mix album Buddha Bar V. A mambo-style version of the song was recorded by the swing revival group Lee Press-on and the Nails for the album El Bando en Fuego. A version of the song was recorded by Mic Gillette on his album Ear Candy. A Spanish version was also recorded in Santiago, Chile, by Bambi, a popular singer in the mid-1960s. The title was "Mejor Ahora". The Greek singer Elli Paspala performed the Italian version on her 1993 live album Η Ελλη Πασπαλά στο Μέγαρο Μουσικής (Elli Paspala at the Concert Hall). A singer from Israel, Ludmila Shapira recorded Yiddish version, Farnakht iz beser, in 2025 with lyrics by Lenny Misikoff on YouTube.

== Michael Bublé version ==
"It Had Better Be Tonight (Meglio Stasera)"

Single by Michael Bublé

from the album Call Me Irresponsible
- Released: December 8, 2007
- Recorded: 2007
- Genre: Jazz, Traditional Pop
- Length: 3:06
- Label: 143, Reprise
- Songwriters: Franco Migliacci, Johnny Mercer, Henry Mancini

Michael Bublé singles chronology
| "Lost" (2007) | "It Had Better Be Tonight (Meglio Stasera)" (2007) | "Comin' Home Baby" (2008) |

Promotional Music Video
- "It Had Better Be Tonight" (Hook) at ContactMusic.com

"It Had Better Be Tonight (Meglio Stasera)" was later covered by Canadian crooner Michael Bublé, and released as the fourth single from his third studio album, Call Me Irresponsible. Bublé's version of the song is an adaptation of the musical arrangement previously made for Lena Horne.

=== Background ===
Bublé's version of the song reached #74 in the UK Singles Chart after being used in an advertising campaign for Marks & Spencer. The track became one of Bublé's most remixed songs, with mixes by Eddie Amador being made available for download. No music video was made to accompany the release, as Bublé was away on tour at the time of the single's release. A promotional physical version of the single was made available in the United States, where other countries only received a digital release of the single.

=== Track listing ===
- Promotional CD single
1. "It Had Better Be Tonight (Meglio Stasera)" (Eddie Amador's Club Mix) – 7:45
2. "It Had Better Be Tonight (Meglio Stasera)" (Eddie Amador's Club Dub) – 5:15
3. "It Had Better Be Tonight (Meglio Stasera)" (Eddie Amador's House Lovers Mix) – 8:04
4. "It Had Better Be Tonight (Meglio Stasera)" (Eddie Amador's House Lovers Dub) – 6:46
5. "It Had Better Be Tonight (Meglio Stasera)" (Eddie Amador's House Lovers Extra Love) – 4:42
- Digital download
1. "It Had Better Be Tonight (Meglio Stasera)" (Zoned Out Mix) – 3:16
2. "It Had Better Be Tonight (Meglio Stasera)" (Star City Remix) – 3:23
3. "It Had Better Be Tonight (Meglio Stasera)" (Eddie Amador's House Lovers Extra Love) – 4:42
4. "It Had Better Be Tonight (Meglio Stasera)" (Eddie Amador's House Lovers Dub) – 6:46
5. "It Had Better Be Tonight (Meglio Stasera)" (Eddie Amador's House Lovers Mix) – 8:04
6. "It Had Better Be Tonight (Meglio Stasera)" (Eddie Amador's Club Dub) – 5:15
7. "It Had Better Be Tonight (Meglio Stasera)" (Eddie Amador's Club Mix) – 7:45

=== Chart performance ===
| Chart (2007) | Peak position |
|---|---|
| Canadian Hot 100 | 89 |
| UK Singles Chart | 74 |
