= All Dogs Go to Heaven 2 =

1996 American animated film

- Theatrical release poster
- Directed by: Paul Sabella
- Screenplay by: Arne Olsen; Kelly Ward; Mark Young
- Story by: Kelly Ward; Mark Young
- Based on: Characters by Don Bluth and David N. Weiss
- Produced by: Jonathan Dern; Paul Sabella; Kelly Ward; Mark Young
- Starring: Charlie Sheen; Sheena Easton; Ernest Borgnine; Dom DeLuise; George Hearn; Bebe Neuwirth; Adam Wylie
- Edited by: Tony Garber
- Music by: Mark Watters
- Production companies: MGM/UA Family Entertainment; Metro-Goldwyn-Mayer Animation
- Distributed by: MGM/UA Distribution Co.
- Release date: March 29, 1996
- Running time: 84 minutes
- Country: United States
- Language: English
- Box office: $8.6 million

All Dogs Go to Heaven 2 is a 1996 American animated musical fantasy adventure film, and a sequel to Goldcrest Films' animated film All Dogs Go to Heaven (1989). Produced by MGM/UA Family Entertainment and Metro-Goldwyn-Mayer Animation, it was directed by Paul Sabella, with Larry Leker, previously involved in writing the story for the first film, as co-director. Dom DeLuise reprises his role from the first film, alongside new cast members Charlie Sheen, Ernest Borgnine and Bebe Neuwirth, respectively. New characters are voiced by Sheena Easton, Adam Wylie and George Hearn.

Don Bluth, the director of the original film, had no involvement with it. It was the second of only two theatrical sequels to a film directed by Don Bluth to not involve Bluth himself, the first being An American Tail: Fievel Goes West, as 13 sequels to The Land Before Time and a single sequel to The Secret of NIMH were direct-to-video releases along with two sequels of An American Tail in 1998–2000, as well as An All Dogs Christmas Carol. Grossing over $8 million worldwide, the film received negative reviews from critics and was MGM's last theatrically released animated film until Igor (2008). It also served as the series premiere for All Dogs Go to Heaven: The Series.

== Plot ==
Nearly 60 years after the events of the first film, Charlie B. Barkin welcomes his friend, Itchy, to Heaven, but states that he is disillusioned by the afterlife. Their old nemesis, Carface Caruthers, steals Gabriel's Horn, but loses it somewhere over San Francisco in his attempt to escape with it. When the head angel Annabelle announces the horn's theft, Charlie submits his candidacy to retrieve it, reminding Annabelle of his familiarity with street life. Annabelle sends Charlie and Itchy to Earth to retrieve it, and gives them one miracle to use. Upon arrival in San Francisco, Charlie and Itchy attempt to indulge in their old habits, but they discover that they are ghosts, and therefore unable to interact with the physical world. At a tavern where Charlie is enchanted by a beautiful and charming Irish Setter named Sasha La Fleur, Carface appears in a corporeal form granted by a red dog collar created by Red, an elderly dog fortune teller who gives Charlie and Itchy equivalent collars effective for a single day. Unbeknownst to the duo, Red is actually a large demonic cat who intends to take the horn for himself with Carface's help.

Charlie and Itchy meet Sasha and an 8-year-old human boy she is looking after named David, who ran away from home to become a street magician. Charlie uses his miracle to grant Sasha the ability to converse with David, who comes to believe that Charlie is his guardian angel. Charlie sees the horn being taken into an SFPD police station and recovers it, but in his reluctance to return to Heaven, he hides it in a lobster trap. After David's street performance ends in failure, he finally reveals that he believes that his father and stepmother, who are expecting a new baby, will care less for him once it is born. Charlie persuades him otherwise and promises to return him home, but privately expresses to Sasha his doubts on being able to fulfill his promise. Charlie and Itchy's collars vanish, and they once more become ghosts.

Carface kidnaps David and orders Charlie to bring Gabriel's horn to Alcatraz Island and give it to Red in exchange for David's life. Determined to keep his word, Charlie satisfies Red's demand, and Red uses the horn to capture and imprison Heaven's canine angels in Alcatraz while opening a portal to permanently connect the human world to Hell. After a struggle against Red, Charlie regains the horn and plays it to free the angels and send Red and Carface – the latter having sold his soul for his collar – back to Hell. Charlie and Itchy are spirited away to Heaven, and Charlie gives the horn back to Annabelle in exchange for a new life. Charlie bids farewell to Itchy, who decides to remain in Heaven, and while Annabelle and Itchy return to Heaven, Charlie returns to San Francisco and happily reunites with Sasha and David, who returns home and reconciles with his relieved father and stepmother. Charlie and Sasha, who have become mates, are adopted by David's family as pets.

== Voice cast ==
Burt Reynolds, Vic Tayback and Melba Moore are replaced by Charlie Sheen, Ernest Borgnine and Bebe Neuwirth respectively, but three characters were written out of the sequel. Anne-Marie was written out of the story, out of respect to her actress Judith Barsi who was murdered on July 25, 1988, alongside Flo, who would remain absent from the story as well. Killer, on the other hand, was withheld until the series.

Main characters

- Charlie Sheen as Charles "Charlie" B. Barkin, a German Shepherd who returns from Heaven to find Gabriel's Horn. It is revealed that as a puppy, he ran away from home, a point he mentions to David to convince him to return home. Charlie Sheen replaced Burt Reynolds from the first film.
  - Jesse Corti as Charlie's singing voice.
- Dom DeLuise as Itchiford "Itchy" Dachshund, Charlie's best friend. His motives are to find the horn and go straight back up to Heaven. Dom DeLuise was the only original actor to reprise his role from the first film.
- Sheena Easton as Sasha la Fleur, an attractive Irish Setter, talented lounge singer and Charlie's love interest.
- Adam Wylie as David, a disillusioned 8-year-old human boy and Sasha's owner. He believes that Charlie and Itchy are his guardian angels sent to get him back home safely. He replaces the role of Anne-Marie from the original film.
- George Hearn as Red, a large beast-like demonic cat from Hell and the main antagonist. His goal is to imprison the dogs of Heaven, overthrow humanity, and permanently join Hell with the mortal world. To manipulate his victims, he disguises himself as a blinded elderly dog through his ability to shapeshift.
- Bebe Neuwirth as Annabelle, the archangel Whippet in Heaven. She summons Charlie and Itchy to retrieve Gabriel's stolen Horn. She was voiced by singer Melba Moore in the first film.
- Ernest Borgnine as Carface Caruthers, Charlie's arch-enemy, a Pit bull/bulldog mix

Supporting characters

- Wallace Shawn as Labrador MC, the duplicitous MC at Sasha's lounge.
- Hamilton Camp as Gavin, a Chihuahua. He waits for dogs especially a dog who puts on some weight to be healthy called Fluffy.
- Dan Castellaneta as Tall Customs Dog
- Pat Corley as Officer McDowell
- Jim Cummings as Jingles, a Yorkshire Terrier who got kicked out of the sing-off, but was given the first place bone by Sasha.
- Bobby Di Cicco as Tom, David's father.
- Annette Helde as Claire, David's son pregnant step-mother.
- Marabina Jaimes as Officer Reyes
- Tony Jay as Reginald
- Maurice LaMarche as Lost & Found Officer
- Steve Mackall as Short Customs Dog
- Kevin Michael Richardson as Ace the St. Bernard / Officer Andrews

== Production ==
David Feiss served as an in-house supervising animator, storyboard artist and character designer for the state-side production. Much of the film's animation was outsourced to foreign studios, such as Wang Film Productions in Taipei, Taiwan (from which Yang Chih Tsang was the directing animator) and its Bangkok, Thailand-based division (from which Jov Huang and Shih-fu Liao were supervising animators), Phoenix Animation in Toronto, Ontario (from which Julian Harris was the directing animator), A-Film in Copenhagen, Denmark (from which Jorgen Lerdam was the directing animator), Dino Animation in London, England (from which Dino Athanassiou was a sequence director), Red Rover in London, England (from which Andy Knight was a directing animator), Scowling Wolf in St Leonards, Australia (from which Peter Sheehan and Richard Zaloudek were art directors), Catflap Animation in Crows Nest, Australia (from which Maurice Glacomini was a supervising animator), Franck & Franck in Paris, France (from which Emmanuel Franck was a supervising animator) and Screen Animation Ireland LTD (formerly Don Bluth Entertainment) in Dublin, Ireland.

== Music ==
Mark Watters composed the score for the film. Barry Mann and Cynthia Weil wrote the lyrics and music for the songs. A soundtrack was released on January 20, 1996, by MCA Records on vinyl record, compact cassette and CD.

=== Songs ===
Original songs performed in the film include:

No.	Title	Performer(s)	Length
1.	"It's Too Heavenly Here"	Jesse Corti
2.	"Count Me Out"	Sheena Easton
3.	"My Afghan Hairless"	Jim Cummings
4.	"It Feels So Good to Be Bad"	George Hearn & Ernest Borgnine
5.	"On Easy Street"	Jesse Corti, Adam Wylie & Dom DeLuise
6.	"I Will Always Be With You"	Sheena Easton & Jesse Corti
7.	"I Will Always Be With You (End Title)"	Helen Darling & Danny Frazier

== Release ==
=== Theatrical ===
All Dogs Go to Heaven 2 was originally scheduled for release during the 1995 holiday season, but was later pushed back to its current date of March 29, 1996 to avoid competition with Disney/Pixar's Toy Story and Universal/Amblimation's Balto.

=== Box office ===
Although the budget is unknown, the film earned $2,256,118 during its opening weekend and grossed $8,620,678 in its theatrical release. It had the worst opening weekend for an animated film playing in over 2,000 theaters until Delgo in 2008.

=== Critical reception ===
As of August 2025, the film has a 33% approval rating on Rotten Tomatoes based on 6 reviews, with an average rating of 5.5/10.

Despite the negative reception, much of the voice cast received praise. Adam Wylie was nominated for a Young Artist Award for Best Performance in a Voiceover, but lost to Jonathan Taylor Thomas. Sheena Easton's Sasha and George Hearn's Red in particular have been held up as examples of well-done voice acting carrying an animated film. Common Sense Media, on the other hand, gave it positive reviews because of some improvement over its predecessor with the plotline and some modifications with Charlie's concept.

Barbara Creed for The Age criticized the film's animation as "flat" and "uninspiring", but praised the story and characters, and considered the film to be entertaining for children.

== Home media ==
All Dogs Go to Heaven 2 was originally released on VHS during the week ending on September 14, 1996. The film was released on DVD on March 6, 2001, and on Blu-ray on March 29, 2011.

== Accolades ==
=== Young Artist Awards ===
- Best Family Feature – Animation or Special Effects
- Best New Voiceover Performance – Adam Wylie

== See also ==
- List of films about angels
