= Maurice Richlin =

American screenwriter

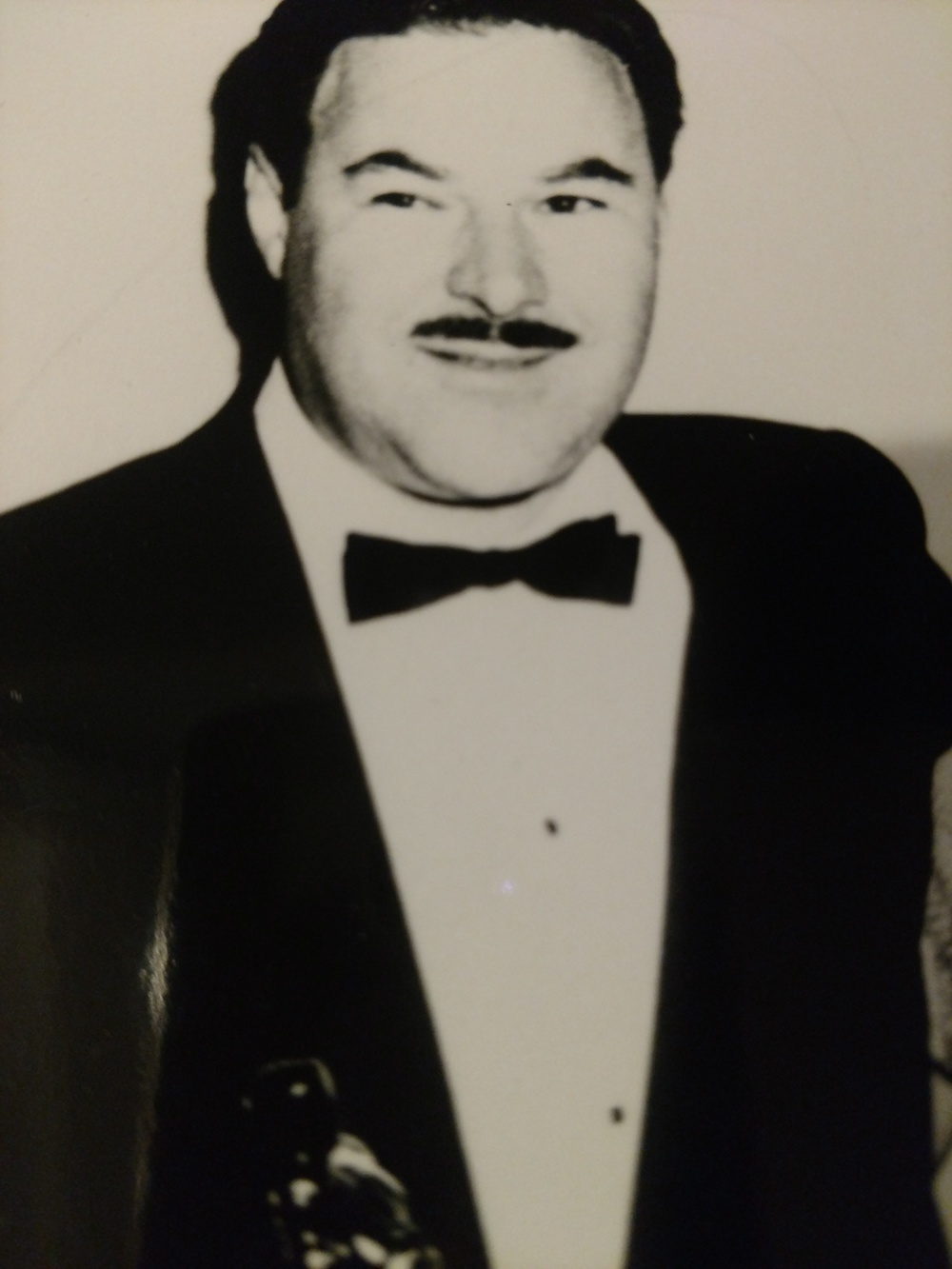
- Maurice Richlin, 1960 Academy Awards, age 40
- Born: February 23, 1920; Omaha, Nebraska, U.S.
- Died: November 13, 1990 (aged 70); Los Angeles, California, U.S.
- Resting place: Greenwood Memorial Park, San Diego, California, U.S.
- Occupation: Screenwriter
- Years active: 1953–1974
- Children: 6 (including Lance Richlin)

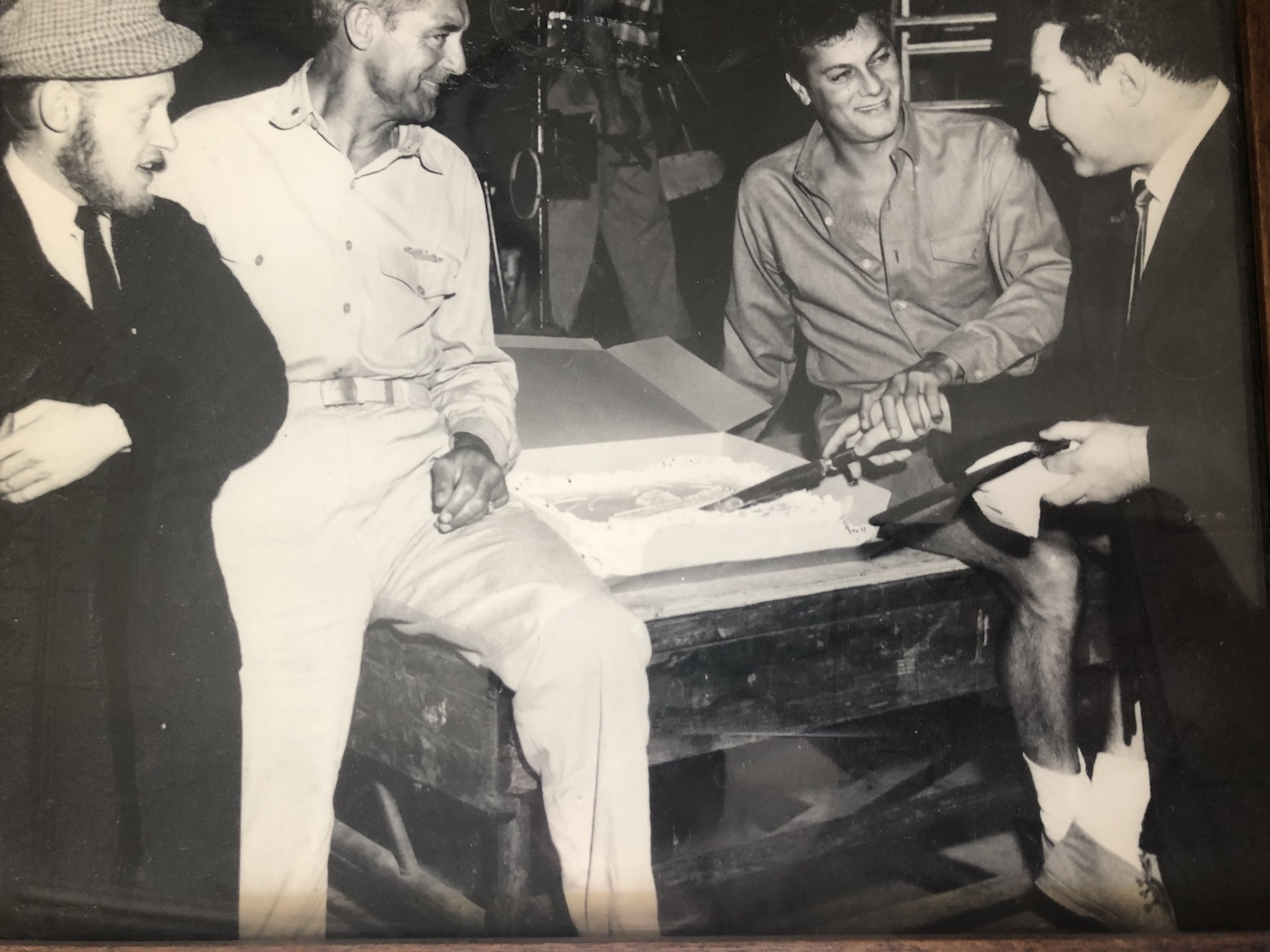
Shapiro, Grant, Richlin, Curtis

Maurice Richlin (February 23, 1920 – November 13, 1990) was an American screenwriter. He received two Academy Award for Best Original Screenplay nominations for Pillow Talk and Operation Petticoat in the same year. For the first of which he won along with Russell Rouse, Stanley Shapiro and Clarence Greene.

Richlin served in the U.S. Army during World War II.

He co-wrote the original treatment, story and screenplay, The Pink Panther.

He wrote All in a Night's Work, Come September, Soldier in the Rain, For Pete's Sake.

He wrote the story for What Did You Do in the War, Daddy?.

He had an extensive career writing in radio and later, television, before his film career.

His son is the artist Lance Richlin.
