= Robert Simonds =

American film producer

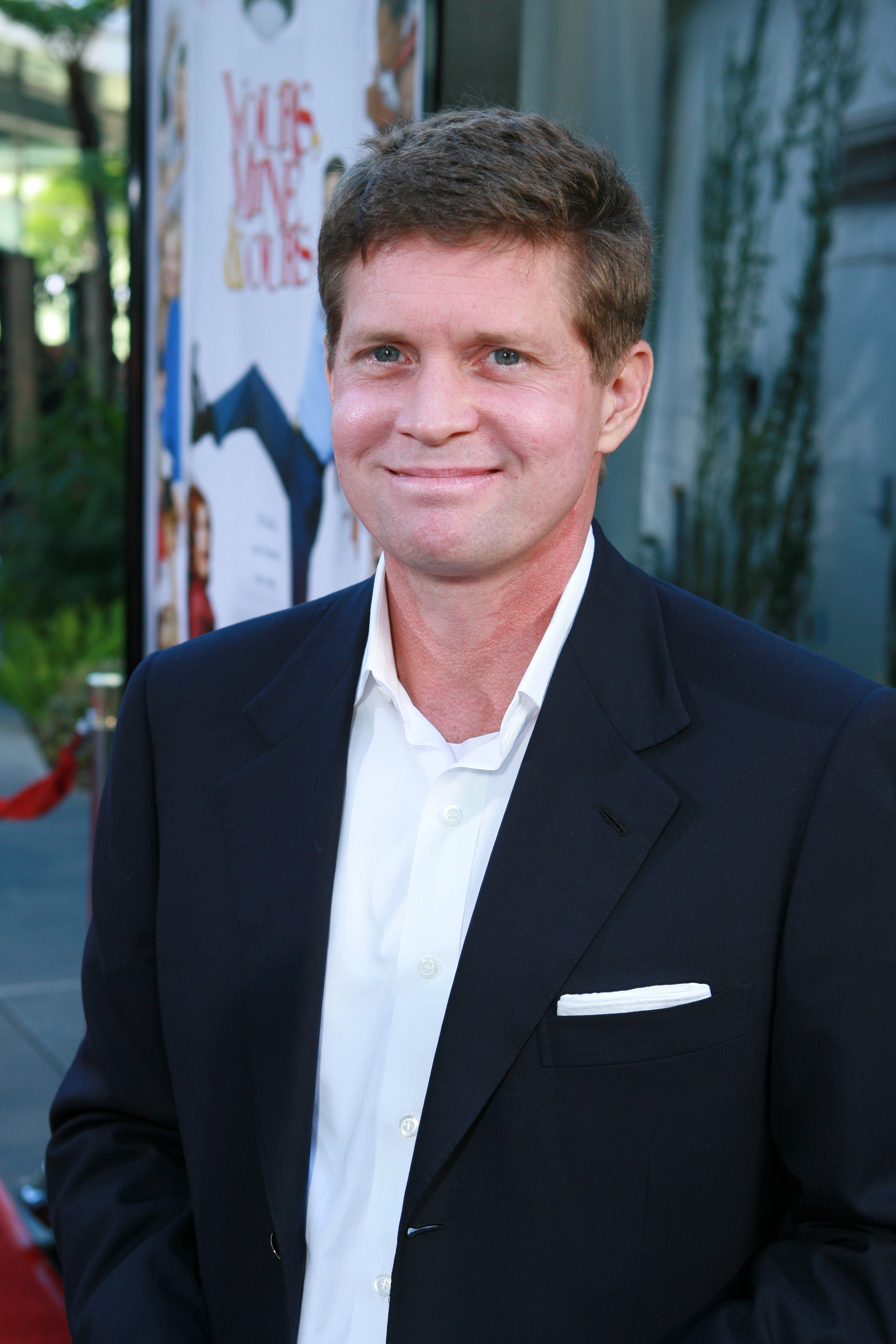
- Simonds at the premiere of Yours, Mine & Ours in 2005
- Born: 1964 (age 61–62); Phoenix, Arizona, U.S.
- Education: Yale University
- Occupations: Film producer Chairman, STX Entertainment
- Years active: 1990–present
- Known for: The Wedding Singer (1998); Big Daddy (1999); Cheaper by the Dozen (2003); The Upside (2017)
- Spouse: Anne Biondi (m. 1999)
- Children: 5

Robert Bruce Simonds Jr. (born 1964) is an American film producer, entrepreneur, and the founder & chairman of STX Entertainment, which creates, produces, distributes, finances, and markets film (as STXfilms), television (as STXtelevision), digital media (as STXdigital), and live events as well as virtual reality (as STXsurreal). According to The Wall Street Journal in its first four years, Simonds more than tripled the company's valuation to an estimated US$3.5 billion.

In September 2017, it was reported that STX was close to an initial public offering on the Hong Kong Stock Exchange (SEHK), and in April 2018, the company announced it had filed for an IPO. In October 2018, it was announced that STX would not go through with the IPO, as political and market conditions had changed. Prior to working at STX, Simonds was an independent film producer whose over 30 films have generated more than $6 billion in worldwide box office revenue. Simonds is reported to have a net worth of $800 million.

== Early life and education ==
Simonds was born in Phoenix, the son of Robert Bruce Simonds, Sr., a businessman. He graduated from Yale University.

== Producing ==
From 1990 to 2023, Simonds has produced, executive produced, or financed over 125 globally distributed star-driven films, generating over $11 billion in worldwide revenue. His credits include the Adam Sandler films Billy Madison, Happy Gilmore, The Wedding Singer, Big Daddy and The Waterboy; Cheaper by the Dozen, and The Pink Panther, which star Steve Martin. He also produced This Means War with Academy Award-winning actress Reese Witherspoon and Tom Hardy, The Gentlemen with Academy Award-winning actor Matthew McConaughey, The Upside with Academy Award-nominated actor Bryan Cranston, Bad Moms, Molly's Game with Academy Award-winning actress Jessica Chastain, The Foreigner, Hustlers, The Mauritanian with Academy Award-winning actress Jodie Foster, My Son, Operation Fortune: Ruse de Guerre, Guy Ritchie's The Covenant with Academy Award-nominated actor Jake Gyllenhaal, Ferrari with Academy Award-nominated actor Adam Driver and Academy Award-winning actress Penelope Cruz, My Spy: The Eternal City, Greenland, and Greenland: Migration. Simonds has produced a number of highly-profitable cult films including Joe Dirt and Half Baked. Simonds was mentored by his father-in-law, former Viacom and Universal head Frank Biondi Jr.

== STX Entertainment ==
=== Formation ===
In 2012, Simonds and Bill McGlashan, founder and managing partner of private equity firm TPG Growth, began conceptualizing and building a film, television and multimedia company that would make, market and distribute star-driven, commercial content to be distributed worldwide. In 2014, STX Entertainment was formally launched with financing led by TPG Growth, and the company later secured investments from Chinese private equity firm Hony Capital and other individuals including Gigi Pritzker and William "Beau" Wrigley, Jr. II.

Serving as chairman and CEO of STX, Simonds hired entertainment industry veterans to build his executive team including former Viacom Entertainment Group COO Thomas B. McGrath and former CEO of Crest Animation Noah Fogelson. Former Universal Pictures chairman Adam Fogelson and former Disney and Fox production and marketing chief Oren Aviv were also added to the team. Discovery Communications' former CFO Andrew Warren and former Paramount Pictures and Condé Nast communications head Patricia Röckenwagner later also joined.

The company has multiple divisions: film (STXfilms), which includes animation and family content; television (STXtelevision), which includes scripted and unscripted content; and digital media (STXdigital); along with an international partnership and distribution arm headquartered in London (STXinternational).

In 2016, the company received additional investment from Chinese Internet company Tencent and Hong Kong-based telecommunications company PCCW, and East West Bank's chairman and CEO Dominic Ng. In 2017, the world's largest international television and broadband company Liberty Global invested an undisclosed amount in the company. Funds from that round of financing will be used to continue to build STX Entertainment's TV division, further expand internationally and potentially make acquisitions. In March 2019, STX raised $700 million in new capital, in a round led by TPG Growth and Hony Capital, to help STX release more films, expand its TV business, and pursue acquisitions.

STX Entertainment's Board of Directors is composed of investors and industry veterans including: Simonds, David Bonderman (founding partner of TPG Capital), John Zhao (CEO of Hony Capital), Gigi Pritzker (founder of MWM Studios), Janice Lee (managing director of PCCW Media Group), Tracy Cui (managing director of Hony Capital), Frank Biondi (former president and CEO of Viacom and former chairman and CEO of Universal Studios; senior managing director of WaterView Advisors), Dominic Ng (chairman and CEO of East West Bank), Carmen Chang (chairman of New Enterprise Associates), and Bruce Mann (chief programming officer of Liberty Global).

=== STXfilms ===
When STX was launched the film division of the company focused its efforts on creating a new model. Rather than pursuing the traditional distribution process the company secured direct distribution agreements with North American theater chains AMC, Regal, Cinemark, Goodrich, Marcus Theatres, and Carmike Cinemas. In early 2015, the company signed a multi-year television output agreement to release films exclusively to Showtime Networks and its multiplex channels Showtime, TMC and Flix, covering STX theatrical releases through 2019. In April 2015, the company entered a multi-year partnership with Universal Studios Home Entertainment for Universal to handle marketing, sales and distribution services for Blu-ray, DVD and VOD platforms for STX theatrical titles in North America. That same month, STXfilms closed a three-year slate deal with Huayi Brothers, one of China's largest film studios, enabling the companies to co-produce and co-distribute 12 to 15 films annually. In 2015, STXfilms acquired its first film at the Toronto International Film Festival, purchasing the worldwide rights to Hardcore Henry for $10 million USD. In January 2017, STXfilms signed a three-year marketing and distribution agreement with Luc Besson's EuropaCorp Films USA to release their upcoming slate of films.

STXfilms projects have included Bad Moms; Molly's Game; I Feel Pretty; and Gringo with Amazon Studios; The Gift, written, co-produced and directed by Joel Edgerton; The Edge of Seventeen; The Foreigner starring Jackie Chan; and Secret in Their Eyes starring Nicole Kidman and Julia Roberts; The Boy; and Free State of Jones starring Matthew McConaughey. STXfilms announced The Happytime Murders starring Melissa McCarthy and the film was released on August 24, 2018; a scrapped romantic comedy which was to be developed by and star Anne Hathaway; and Second Act, a romantic comedy starring Jennifer Lopez and directed by Peter Segal that came out December 21, 2018.

=== STXtelevision ===
In 2014, the television division’s first project was the 13-episode series State of Affairs, starring Katherine Heigl and Alfre Woodard, which was sold to NBC. In 2015, STXtelevision produced the NBC pilot Problem Child, based on the 1990 film of the same name. In April 2016, the STXtelevision Chinese variety show Number One Surprise premiered on Hunan TV, and became the #1 show in China with over 1 billion total views. In May 2017, STXtelevision announced it had acquired the first TV project from Kevin Kwan, author of Crazy Rich Asians. In November 2017, STXtelevision announced Valley of the Boom, a docudrama about the 1990s tech boom from showrunner and director Matthew Carnahan and executive producer Arianna Huffington, set to air on NatGeo. STXtelevision produced season 23 of True Life, which aired on MTV in 2017. In February 2018, Fox and STXtelevision announced it is developing an unscripted series based on STXfilms' Bad Moms. In October 2018, STXtv received a pilot order from YouTube for The Edge of Seventeen, based on the film of the same name released by STXfilms in 2016.

=== STXdigital ===
In August 2016, STXdigital acquired virtual reality (VR) studio Surreal, renaming it STXsurreal. Founded in 2015, in its first year Surreal produced over 70 immersive VR experiences. In June 2017, STXsurreal announced a partnership with media services agency Horizon Media to develop and produce VR and immersive content for the brand's new UNCVR unit. In 2018, STXsurreal announced a slate of original projects including The Limit, a live-action, short-form series from Robert Rodriguez and starring Michelle Rodriguez; New Tricks, directed and produced by Ed Helms; and The Kiev Exchange, a spinoff of STXfilms' Mile 22. In December 2017, it was announced that STXdigital acquired the exclusive Chinese distribution rights to Dick Clark's New Year's Rockin' Eve from Dick Clark Productions (dcp), along with the Chinese distribution rights to the 2018 Golden Globes broadcast from dcp and the Hollywood Foreign Press Association. STXdigital and Tencent partnered to broadcast both shows on Tencent Video. In January 2018, the companies announced they would also co-produce a live Chinese-language Golden Globes red carpet pre-show, to air live with the telecast.

=== STXinternational ===
In April 2016, a dedicated international division (STXinternational) opened. Headquartered in London, the division is led by former Film4 head David Kosse. The division launched with a slate of six films that included Andy Serkis's directorial debut Breathe (which opened the 2017 London Film Festival), Home Again starring Reese Witherspoon, and Wind River starring Jeremy Renner and Elizabeth Olsen. Additional titles on the STXinternational slate include Ridley Scott's All the Money in the World, Morten Tyldum's The Marsh King's Daughter, and Bart Layton's American Animals; and titles from the main STXfilms slate. In March 2019, John Friedberg was named president of STXinternational.

== Accolades ==
In 2014, Simonds was featured as one of Hollywood's top dealmakers in Variety magazine's Dealmakers Impact Report for his work at STX. The Hollywood Reporter has named Simonds one of the 100 Most Powerful People in Entertainment in each of their annual rankings through 2018, since first publishing them in 2016. In 2017, Variety featured Simonds on their first annual Variety500: Entertainment Leaders and Icons list. He made the list again in 2018.

== Personal life ==
While attending Yale, Simonds dated actress Jennifer Beals. Simonds married Anne Biondi in 1999, and the couple live in Los Angeles with their son and four daughters. About 2010 Simonds bought a house at Mulholland Estates for $4.7 million.

== Filmography ==
=== As producer ===
#	Title	Year	Star(s)	Domestic Box Office
1	Problem Child	1990	John Ritter	$53,470,891
2	Problem Child 2	1991	John Ritter	$25,104,700
3	Shout	1991	John Travolta	$3,547,684
4	Airheads	1994	Brendan Fraser, Steve Buscemi, Adam Sandler	$5,751,882
5	Billy Madison	1995	Adam Sandler	$25,588,734
6	Happy Gilmore	1996	Adam Sandler	$38,824,099
7	Bulletproof	1996	Damon Wayans, Adam Sandler	$21,576,954
8	That Darn Cat	1997	Christina Ricci	$18,301,610
9	Leave It to Beaver	1997	Christopher McDonald	$10,925,060
10	Half Baked	1998	Dave Chappelle	$17,460,020
11	The Wedding Singer	1998	Adam Sandler, Drew Barrymore	$80,245,725
12	Dirty Work	1998	Norm Macdonald, Artie Lange	$10,023,282
13	The Waterboy	1998	Adam Sandler	$161,491,646
14	Big Daddy	1999	Adam Sandler	$163,479,795
15	Screwed	2000	Norm Macdonald, Dave Chappelle	$7,027,345
16	Little Nicky	2000	Adam Sandler	$39,464,775
17	Head over Heels	2001	Freddie Prinze Jr.	$10,424,470
18	See Spot Run	2001	David Arquette	$33,357,476
19	Joe Dirt	2001	David Spade	$27,087,695
20	Corky Romano	2001	Chris Kattan	$23,980,304
21	Just Married	2003	Ashton Kutcher, Brittany Murphy	$56,127,162
22	Cheaper by the Dozen	2003	Steve Martin	$138,614,544
23	Taxi	2004	Queen Latifah, Jimmy Fallon	$36,611,066
24	Herbie: Fully Loaded	2005	Lindsay Lohan	$66,023,816
25	Rebound	2005	Martin Lawrence	$16,809,014
26	Yours, Mine and Ours	2005	Dennis Quaid	$53,412,862
27	The Pink Panther	2006	Steve Martin, Beyoncé	$82,226,474
28	The Shaggy Dog	2006	Tim Allen	$61,123,569
29	License to Wed	2007	Robin Williams, John Krasinski	$43,799,818
30	The Pink Panther 2	2009	Steve Martin	$35,922,978
31	The Spy Next Door	2010	Jackie Chan	$24,307,086
32	Furry Vengeance	2010	Brendan Fraser	$17,630,465
33	This Means War	2012	Reese Witherspoon, Tom Hardy, Chris Pine	$54,760,791
34	21 Bridges	2019	Chadwick Boseman	$28,539,757
35	My Spy	2020	Dave Bautista	
36	Happy Gilmore 2	2025	Adam Sandler	

=== As executive producer ===
#	Title	Year	Star(s)	Worldwide Box Office
1	The Gift	2015	Jason Bateman	$59 million
2	Secret in Their Eyes	2015	Chiwetel Ejiofor, Nicole Kidman, Julia Roberts	$34.9 million
3	The Boy	2016	Lauren Cohan	$64.2 million
4	Hardcore Henry	2016	Sharlto Copley	$16.8 million
5	Free State of Jones	2016	Matthew McConaughey	$25 million
6	Bad Moms	2016	Mila Kunis	$183.9 million
7	The Edge of Seventeen	2016	Hailee Steinfeld	$18.8 million
8	The Bye Bye Man	2017	Douglas Smith	$26.7 million
9	The Space Between Us	2017	Gary Oldman, Asa Butterfield	$14.8 million
10	The Foreigner	2017	Jackie Chan, Pierce Brosnan	$145.4 million
11	A Bad Moms Christmas	2017	Mila Kunis	$130.6 million
12	Molly's Game	2017	Jessica Chastain	$59.3 million
13	Den of Thieves	2018	Gerard Butler	$80.5 million
14	I Feel Pretty	2018	Amy Schumer	$94.5 million
15	Adrift	2018	Shailene Woodley, Sam Claflin	$59.9 million
16	Mile 22	2018	Mark Wahlberg	$66.3 million
17	The Happytime Murders	2018	Melissa McCarthy	$27.5 million
18	Peppermint	2018	Jennifer Garner	$53.8 million
19	Second Act	2018	Jennifer Lopez	$72.2 million
20	The Upside	2019	Bryan Cranston, Kevin Hart	$122.1 million
21	UglyDolls	2019	Kelly Clarkson	$22.7 million
22	Poms	2019	Diane Keaton	$14.8 million
23	Hustlers	2019	Constance Wu, Jennifer Lopez	$157.5 million
24	Countdown	2019	Anne Winters	$48 million
25	Playmobil: The Movie	2019	Anya Taylor-Joy, Gabriel Bateman	$16.3 million
26	The Gentlemen	2020	Matthew McConaughey	$115.1 million
27	The Secret Garden	2020	Colin Firth, Julie Walters	
28	Greenland	2020	Gerard Butler	$52.3 million
29	I Care a Lot	2020	Rosamund Pike	$1.3 million
30	Songbird	2020	KJ Apa	
31	The Mauritanian	2021	Jodie Foster, Tahar Rahim	$7.5 million
32	Queenpins	2021	Kristen Bell	
33	Copshop	2021	Gerard Butler	$6.8 million
34	My Son	2021	James McAvoy	
35	National Champions	2021	Stephan James	
36	The Contractor	2022	Chris Pine	

== Television ==
=== As executive producer ===
Name	Format	Network	Year(s)
Problem Child	Animated	USA	1993-94
State of Affairs	Drama	NBC	2014-15
