= Luana Anders =

American actress (1938–1996)

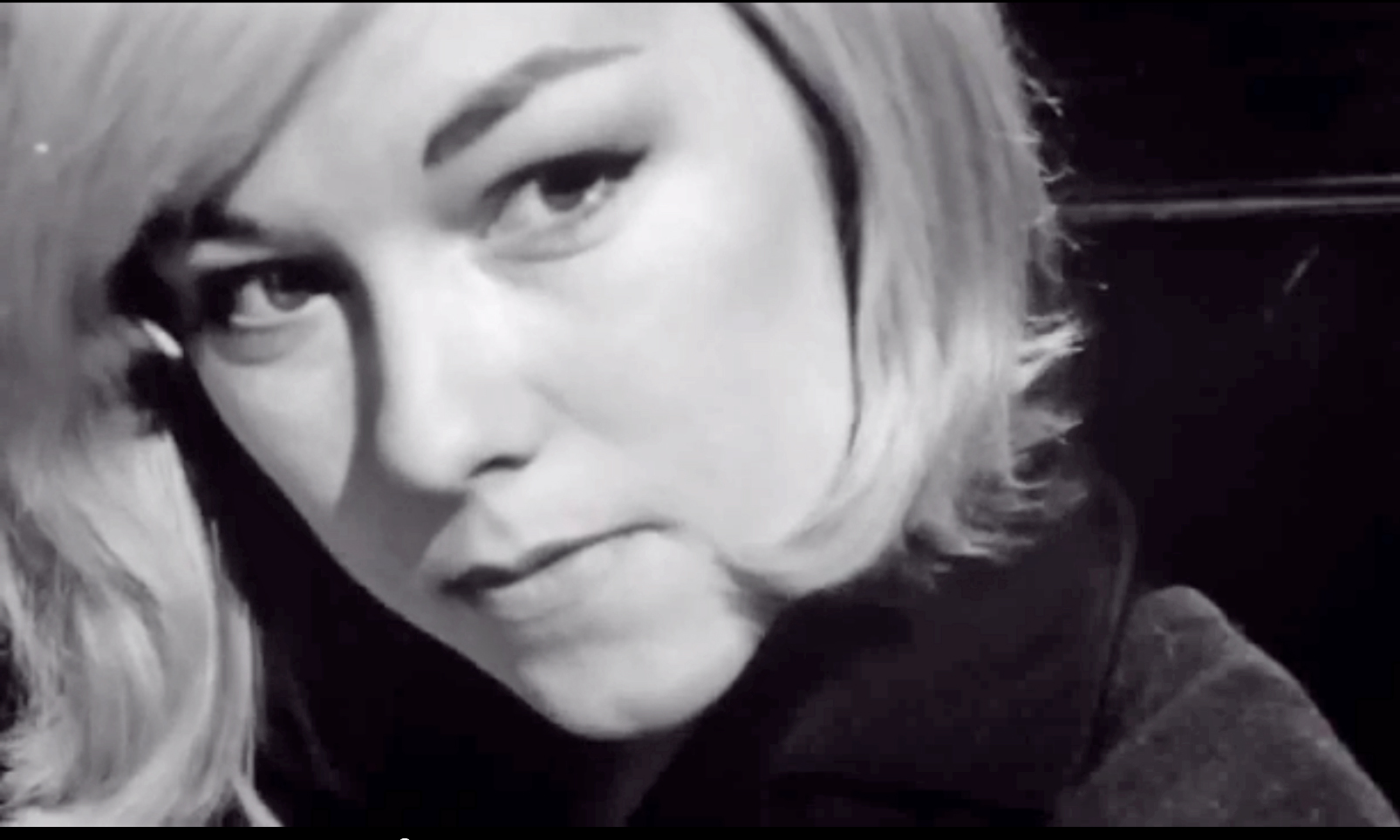
- Luana Anders in trailer to Dementia 13
- Born: Luana Margo Anderson; May 12, 1938; New York City, U.S.
- Died: July 21, 1996 (aged 58); Mar Vista, Los Angeles, California, U.S.
- Occupations: Actress, screenwriter
- Years active: 1955–1996

Luana Anders (born Luana Margo Anderson; May 12, 1938 – July 21, 1996) was an American actress and screenwriter.

== Career ==
Anders appeared in a number of low-budget films, including starring roles in Life Begins at 17 and Reform School Girl, along with Sally Kellerman. Her best-known performances may have been as Vincent Price's sister in Corman's The Pit and the Pendulum (1961) and as a murder victim in Francis Ford Coppola's Dementia 13 (1963). She also appeared in Curtis Harrington's cult film Night Tide (1961) opposite Dennis Hopper, who later cast her as one of the hippie commune girls who go skinny-dipping with Hopper and Peter Fonda in Easy Rider (1969).

Anders appeared in Robert Altman's That Cold Day in the Park, which premiered in 1969 at the Cannes Film Festival, as well as being cast in several of her friend Jack Nicholson's films, including The Trip (1967), The Last Detail (1973), The Missouri Breaks (1976), Goin' South (1978), and The Two Jakes (1990). Her other film credits include When the Legends Die (1972), The Killing Kind (1973), Shampoo (1975), Personal Best (1982), Movers & Shakers (1985), You Can't Hurry Love (1988), Doppelganger (1993), Wild Bill (1995), and American Strays (1996).

She appeared in a wide range of episodic television, including The Rifleman, Sugarfoot, the "Incident of the Running Man" episode of Rawhide, The Andy Griffith Show, One Step Beyond, Dragnet, as Theresa Ames in "The Guests" (an episode of The Outer Limits), Adam-12 and Hunter. She appeared briefly in several soap operas, including Santa Barbara in the 1991–1992 season.

As a writer, she wrote the original screenplay of Fire on the Amazon (using the pseudonym Margo Blue) for executive producer Roger Corman. She also co-wrote the comedy film Limit Up for MCEG/Virgin with Richard Martini and had a cameo in the film.

== Personal life ==
Anders was a lifelong Buddhist and supporter of the American chapter of Soka Gakkai International (SGI). She died of breast cancer in 1996, aged 58.

== Filmography ==
=== Film ===
Year	Title	Role	Notes
1957	Reform School Girl	Josie Brigg	
1958	The Notorious Mr. Monks	Gilda Hadley	
1958	The Man Who Died Twice	Young Girl Addict	
1958	Life Begins at 17	Carol Peck	
1959	The FBI Story	Mrs. Graham	Uncredited
1961	Night Tide	Ellen Sands	
1961	The Pit and the Pendulum	Catherine Medina	
1963	The Young Racers	Henny	
1963	Dementia 13	Louise Haloran	
1964	Sex and the College Girl	Gwen	
1966	Mondo Keyhole	Vicky	Voice, Uncredited
1967	The Trip	Waitress	
1967	Games	Party Guest	
1968	How Sweet It Is!	Agatzi Girl	
1969	Easy Rider	Lisa	
1969	That Cold Day in the Park	Sylvia	
1971	The Manipulator	Carlotta	
1972	Greaser's Palace	Cholera	
1972	When the Legends Die	Mary	
1973	The Last Detail	Donna	
1973	The Killing Kind	Louise	
1975	Shampoo	Devra	
1976	The Missouri Breaks	Rancher's Wife	
1978	Goin' South	Lorette Anderson	
1979	Paraclete	The Paraclete	Short
1980	Board and Care	Carolyn	Short
1981	One from the Heart		Uncredited
1982	Personal Best	Rita Cahill	
1984	Irreconcilable Differences	Atlanta Widow	
1985	Movers & Shakers	Violette	
1988	You Can't Hurry Love	Macie Hayes	
1989	Limit Up	Teacher	
1990	The Two Jakes	Florist	
1993	Doppelganger	Ginger	
1993	Nowhere to Run	Town Meeting Chairwoman	
1993	Heart and Souls	Records Bureaucrat	
1994	Criminal Passion	Martha	
1995	Wild Bill	Sanitarium Woman	
1996	Point of Betrayal	Nurse	
1996	American Strays	Martha	
1997	Cannes Man	Agent on Phone	(final film role)

=== Television ===
Year	Title	Role	Notes
1957	The Restless Gun	Lucy Anne	"Jody"
1958	Letter to Loretta	Ellen	"Time of Decision"
1959	Cimarron City	Nancy Tucker	"Child of Fear"
1959	The Rifleman	Lisabeth Bishop	"Shivaree"
1959	M Squad	Lola Green	"The Harpes"
1959	Sugarfoot	Princess	"The Avengers"
1959	Alcoa Presents: One Step Beyond	Alice Denning	"The Burning Girl"
1960	Alcoa Presents: One Step Beyond	Joan Goss	"The Voice"
1960	Lawman	Ellie Phelan	"The Swamper"
1961	The Islanders	Trina	"To Bell a Cat"
1961	Rawhide	Maddy Trager	S3:E25, "Incident of the Running Man"
1962	Ben Casey	Lorraine Walenchek	"And Eve Wore a Veil of Tears"
1963	Ben Casey	Ann Bentley	"Dispel the Black Cyclone That Shakes the Throne"
1963	The Eleventh Hour	Cathy Lewis	"Try to Keep Alive Until Next Tuesday"
1963	The Greatest Show on Earth	Margaret	"The Wrecker"
1964	The Outer Limits	Theresa "Tess" Ames	"The Guests"
1966	Vacation Playhouse	Sybil Rockefeller	"My Lucky Penny"
1967	The Andy Griffith Show	Miss Clark	"A Visit to Barney Fife", "Barney Comes to Mayberry"
1966	That Girl	Shirley McChesney	"Don't Just Do Something, Stand There"
1967	That Girl	Beryl	"Leaving the Nest Is for the Birds"
1967	Accidental Family	Esther	"What Is This - Thanksgiving or a Nightmare?'
1967	Dragnet 1967	Noradelle De Leone	"The Big Dog"
1968	Dragnet 1967	Anna Marie Harmon	"The Suicide Attempt"
1968	Hawaii Five-O	Maggie	"...And They Painted Daisies on His Coffin"
1968	Adam-12	Jane Tipton	"Log 111: The Boa Constrictor"
1969	My Friend Tony	Louise	"Computer Murder"
1969	Mayberry R.F.D.	Violet Cashier	"Goober and the Telephone Girl" "Emmett's Retirement"
1970	Dragnet 1967	Eula Van Meter	"Burglary: The Dognappers"
1971	Ironside	Nina Loring	"The Target"
1972	Evil Roy Slade	Alice Fern	TV film
1972	Bonanza	Julie	"Forever"
1972	Mannix	Angie McCall	"Lost Sunday"
1974	Firehouse	Dawn	"Strike, Spare, and Burn"
1977	Little House on the Prairie	Lottie McGinins	"Blizzard"
1978	The Next Step Beyond	Harriet Jessup	"The Love Connection"
1990	Hunter	Sarah Farrell	"Second Sight"
1991	Switched at Birth	Nurse Ames	TV film
1991-1992	Santa Barbara	Rona	TV series
1992	In Sickness and in Health	Dorothy	TV film
