= Board and care =

Board and care may refer to:

- Board and Care, a 1979 Oscar-winning short film about two lovers with Down syndrome
- Board and care home, also called a nursing home
