= Peter Lyons Collister =

American cinematographer (born 1956)

- Born: March 9, 1956 (age 70); Cleveland, Ohio, U.S.
- Occupation: Cinematographer
- Years active: 1980–present

Peter Lyons Collister, A.S.C. (born March 9, 1956) is an American cinematographer and second unit director.

== Life and career ==
Lyons Collister was born in Cleveland, Ohio.

He is currently a member of the American Society of Cinematographers, having worked on over thirty films in his career.

In her 2019 memoir Inside Out, Demi Moore confessed to an affair with Collister in 1983 while she was married to her first husband.

== Filmography ==
=== Film ===
Year	Title	Director	Notes
1985	Avenging Angel	Robert Vincent O'Neil	
1985	KGB: The Secret War	Dwight H. Little	Also credited as executive producer
1986	Getting Even	Dwight H. Little	
1986	The Supernaturals	Armand Mastroianni	
1986	Eye of the Tiger	Richard C. Sarafian	
1987	Can't Buy Me Love	Steve Rash	
1987	He's My Girl	Gabrielle Beaumont	
1988	You Can't Hurry Love	Richard Martini	With John Schwartzman
1988	Pulse	Paul Golding	
1988	Halloween 4: The Return of Michael Myers	Dwight H. Little	
1989	All's Fair	Rocky Lang	
1989	Limit Up	Richard Martini	
1989	The Phantom of the Opera	Dwight H. Little	With Elemér Ragályi
1990	Problem Child	Dennis Dugan	
1991	Livin' Large	Michael Schultz	
1993	Poetic Justice	John Singleton	
1995	Higher Learning	John Singleton	
1996	Dunston Checks In	Ken Kwapis	
1997	The Beautician and the Beast	Ken Kwapis	
1998	The Replacement Killers	Antoine Fuqua	
1999	Deuce Bigalow: Male Gigolo	Mike Mitchell	Also credited as 2nd unit director
2001	The Animal	Luke Greenfield	
2002	Mr. Deeds	Steven Brill	
2002	The Master of Disguise	Perry Andelin Blake	
2004	Win a Date with Tad Hamilton!	Robert Luketic	
2004	Surviving Christmas	Mike Mitchell	With Tom Priestly Jr.
2005	The Amityville Horror	Andrew Douglas	
2006	Garfield: A Tail of Two Kitties	Tim Hill	
2007	Meet Bill	Bernie Goldmann; Melisa Wallack	
2007	Alvin and the Chipmunks	Tim Hill	
2007	Ángeles S.A.	Eduard Bosch	With Juan Carlos Gómez
2010	Furry Vengeance	Roger Kumble	
2011	Hop	Tim Hill	
2015	Barely Lethal	Kyle Newman	
2015	Alvin and the Chipmunks: The Road Chip	Walt Becker	
2016	True Memoirs of an International Assassin	Jeff Wadlow	
2020	The SpongeBob Movie: Sponge on the Run	Tim Hill	Live-action sequences
2021	Clifford the Big Red Dog	Walt Becker	
2025	Smurfs	Chris Miller	Live-action sequences
2025	The SpongeBob Movie: Search for SquarePants	Derek Drymon	Live-action sequences

As second unit director/director of photography
Year	Title	Second unit director	Second unit director of photography	Director
1995	Bad Boys	Yes	Yes	Michael Bay
1996	The Rock	No	Yes	Michael Bay
1998	U.S. Marshals	No	Yes	Stuart Baird
2000	Bait	Yes	Yes	Antoine Fuqua
2003	The Rundown	Yes	Yes	Peter Berg
2004	The Bourne Supremacy	No	Yes	Paul Greengrass
2007	Rush Hour 3	No	Yes	Brett Ratner
2011	The Green Hornet	No	Yes	Michel Gondry
2012	Big Miracle	Yes	Yes	Ken Kwapis
2012	Underworld: Awakening	No	Yes	Måns Mårlind and Björn Stein
2012	The Amazing Spider-Man	Plate unit	Plate unit	Marc Webb
2014	Transformers: Age of Extinction	Yes	Yes	Michael Bay
2015	Point Break	No	Yes	Ericson Core
2016	Office Christmas Party	No	Yes	Will Speck and Josh Gordon
2017	Transformers: The Last Knight	Splinter Unit director	Yes	Michael Bay
2017	Pitch Perfect 3	No	Yes	Trish Sie
2018	Bumblebee	No	Yes	Travis Knight
2019	6 Underground	No	Yes	Michael Bay
2020	Sonic the Hedgehog	Yes	Yes	Jeff Fowler
2021	Thunder Force	No	Yes	Ben Falcone
2022	Sonic the Hedgehog 2	Yes	Yes	Jeff Fowler
2022	The Lost City	Yes	No	Aaron and Adam Nee
2023	The Family Plan	Yes	No	Simon Cellan Jones
2024	Love Lies Bleeding	Yes	No	Rose Glass
2024	Sonic the Hedgehog 3	Yes	Yes	Jeff Fowler
2025	The Naked Gun	Yes	No	Akiva Schaffer
2026	Coyote vs. Acme †	Yes	No	Dave Green

=== Television ===
TV movies
Year	Title	Director
1990	Jury Duty: The Comedy	Michael Schultz
1998	Ghosts of Fear Street	Ken Kwapis
2002	Home of the Brave	Steve Miner
2007	The Weekend	Steven Brill
2008	Sunday! Sunday! Sunday!	Troy Miller

TV series
Year	Title	Director	Notes
1993	Route 66	Mark Sobel; Bill Norton	2 episodes
2009	Tracey Ullman's State of the Union	Troy Miller	Episode "Blogs and Kisses"
2009	Paul Rodriguez & Friends: Comedy Rehab	Gabriela Tagliavini	TV special
2013	Arrested Development	Mitchell Hurwitz; Troy Miller	15 episodes

As second unit director/director of photography
Year	Title	Second unit director	Second unit director of photography	Director	Notes
2021	WandaVision	No	Yes	Matt Shakman	9 episodes; Disney+ miniseries
2024	Knuckles	Yes	Yes	Jeff Fowler; Brandon Trost; Jorma Taccone; Ged Wright; Carol Banker	6 episodes; Paramount+ miniseries
