= Richard Martini (director) =

American film director (born 1955)

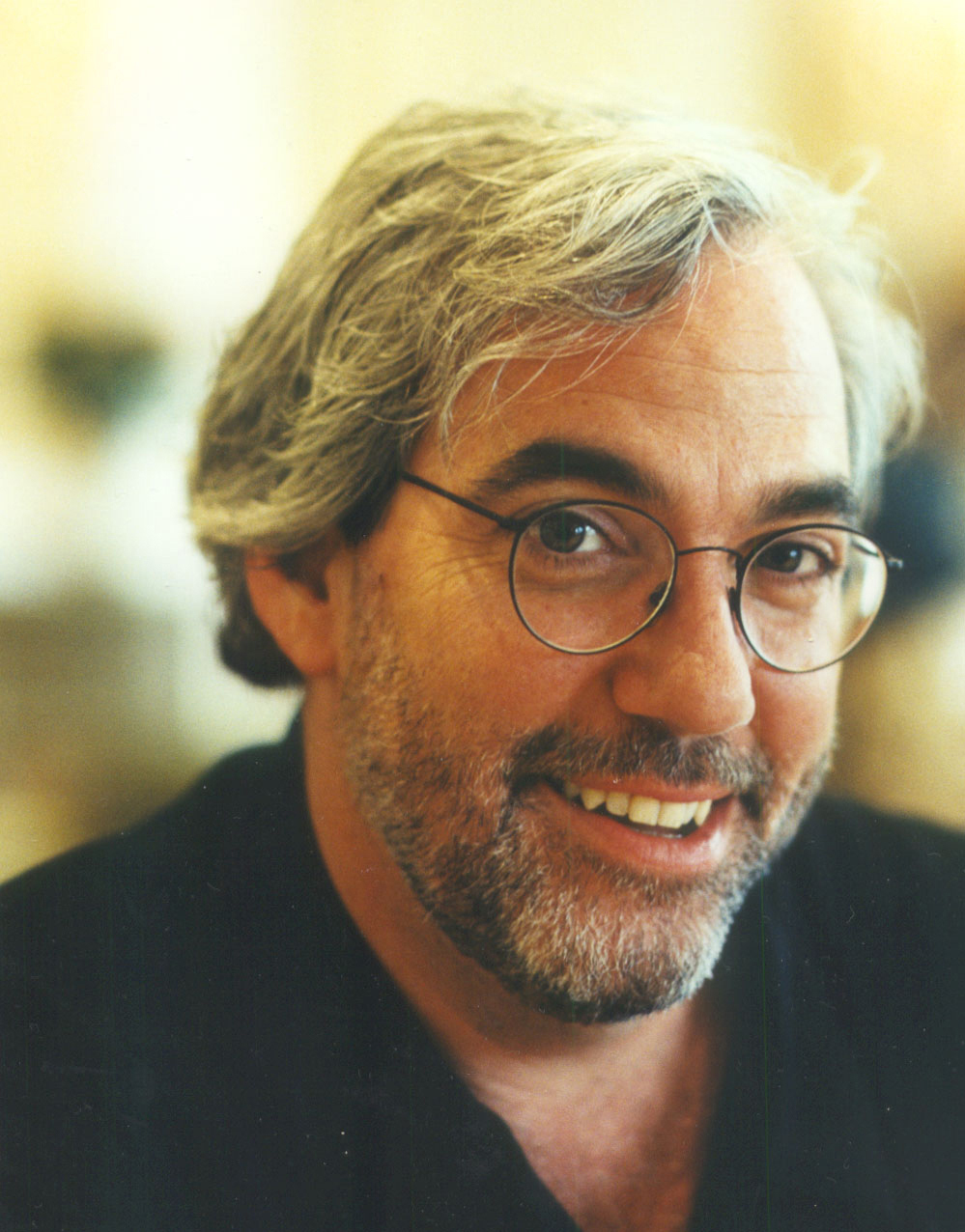
- Born: March 12, 1955 (age 71); Northbrook, Illinois

Richard Martini (born 12 March 1955) is an American film director, producer, screenwriter and freelance journalist.

== Early life and education ==
Martini was born in 1955 and grew up in Northbrook, Illinois. He attended local public schools. He graduated magna cum laude from Boston University with a degree in Humanities, attended University of Southern California Film School and is a 2008 graduate of the Master of Professional Writing Program at USC. His student short film, Lost Angels, was the film debut of fellow Chicago native, actress Daryl Hannah. He took improv classes at Second City in Chicago under Jo Forsberg, and with the Harvey Lembeck Workshop in Los Angeles.

His first documentary film, Special Olympians, won the top prize at the 1980 Mexico City International Film Festival. He made his feature film directorial debut with You Can't Hurry Love, which featured the debut of Bridget Fonda. TNT described it as the "quintessential 80's comedy."

Martini left USC to work for writer/director Robert Towne (Chinatown, Mission: Impossible); he served as an acting coach for Robert Evans on the original The Two Jakes. After that Martini wrote his first feature My Champion, which starred Christopher (son of Robert) Mitchum and Yoko Shimada (Shogun). He wrote the comedy Three For the Road for Vista Films, which starred Charlie Sheen.

Martini directed a comedy short, "Video Valentino," shot by fellow USC alum John Schwartzman (DP of The Amazing Spider-Man) and produced by Jonathan D. Krane. The short led to a deal with Vestron Pictures, where he made You Can't Hurry Love starring Bridget Fonda, Charles Grodin and Kristy McNichol based on the short.

Martini co-wrote and directed two films for producer Jonathan D. Krane: the Faustian comedy Limit Up, set in Chicago, starring Nancy Allen and blues icon Ray Charles, and Point of Betrayal (1996) starring Dina Merrill, Rod Taylor and Rebecca Broussard, which won the Palm Beach International Film Festival as Best Film. Martini then co-wrote and co-directed Cannes Man (released on iTunes in 2010) starring Francesco Quinn and Seymour Cassel, with appearances by Johnny Depp and the "cast of characters who inhabit the film festival each year".

Martini wrote and directed the Dogme 95 film Camera – Dogme #15,shot on digital video; it follows the life of a video camera around the world.

He has also directed documentaries: Tibetan Refugee explores the Tibetan community in Dharamsala, White City/Windy City explores the relationship between Chicago and Casablanca in the Eisenhower "Sister Cities" program, and Journey Into Tibet, follows Buddhist scholar and author Robert Thurman on a sacred journey around Mount Kailash in western Tibet.

Martini co-wrote and produced My Bollywood Bride starring Jason Lewis and Sanjay Suri (released as My Faraway Bride).

Martini's television credits include producing segments and appearing on the award-winning Charles Grodin Show on CNBC. He wrote an upcoming miniseries for HBO about the notorious House of Medici. He has also written freelance articles for Variety, Premiere, Inc.com, edited and wrote Epicurean Rendezvous' "Best 100 Restaurants in Los Angeles" and appeared in USA Today as a commentator about "American Idol." He also contributed a chapter to Charles Grodin's book "If I Only Knew Then... Learning from our mistakes." (Springboard Press.)

He worked on the films Amelia and Salt as a digital media curator, pioneering a method of pre-visualizing a film online. Film director Phillip Noyce hired him to work on both films.

Based on his documentary about hypnotherapy and between life therapist Michael Newton's work Destiny of Souls, Martini's book on the afterlife, Flipside: A Tourist's Guide on How To Navigate the Afterlife, has become a best seller at Amazon. The documentary based on the book was picked up by Gaiam TV for distribution in 2014. The book went to #1 at Amazon in all its genres twice. The series It's a Wonderful Afterlife: Further Adventures into the Flipside Volume One and Volume Two includes interviews with Dr. Bruce Greyson on consciousness and the near-death experience, Gary Schwartz on his research into consciousness, and Mario Beauregard on his research in neurotheology. Martini compares accounts of near-death experiences with transcripts of hypnotherapy sessions of people under deep hypnosis to highlight their similarities. His book "Hacking the Afterlife," examines mediumship claims of "new information" from people no longer on the planet and compares these accounts to the near death experiences and afterlife reports from subjects under hypnosis. He also penned "Backstage Pass to the Flipside: Talking to the Afterlife with Jennifer Shaffer" which includes a foreword by Luana Anders.

Martini has taught film directing at Loyola Marymount University, the Maine Media Workshops, and the John Felice Rome Center.

He is married and has two children. The family lives in Santa Monica, California.

== Filmography ==
- Flipside: A Journey into the Afterlife Flipside: A Journey Into the Afterlife – 2012 – Writer, Director, Producer. Amazon. A documentary that explores the work of Michael Newton with interviews of hypnotherapists, footage of past life regressions and life between life sessions.
- Salt Salt – 2010 – Curated content, digital flashback sequences, Associate to Mr. Noyce. Sony. Angelina Jolie, Liev Schreiber. Phillip Noyce directed thriller.
- Amelia (film) – 2009 – Curated content, Researcher. Fox 2000. Hilary Swank, Richard Gere. The aviator's journey from 1928–1937.
- My Bollywood Bride My Bollywood Bride – 2006 – Co-Writer, Associate Producer. DreamTeam Pictures. Jason Lewis, Kashmira Shah, Sanjay Suri, Golshen Grover. Hollywood meets Bollywood in a romantic comedy.
- Cowboy UpCowboy Up – Second Unit Dir. 2000 Xavier Koller, Kiefer Sutherland, Daryl Hannah. Orchid Prods. Championship Bull Riding.
- Camera – Dogme #15 Camera– Director, Writer. Odyssey Pictures Prod. 2001 Carol Alt, Angie Everhart, Rebecca Broussard. Designated Dogme #15 by the Danish film group.
- Cannes Man (film) Cannes Man – Director, Co-Writer, Music. Rocket Pictures. 1997. Tom Coleman Prod. Seymour Cassel, Francesco Quinn. Guest appearances by Johnny Depp, John Malkovich. ( "Hilarious" Hollywood Rep. "Fast, furious, fun satire" NY Post)
- Point of Betrayal The Point of Betrayal- Director, Music. Trident/Dove International. 1996. Jonathan Krane Prod. Rod Taylor, Dina Merrill, Rebecca Broussard. Paramount Home Video (Rod Lurie – Buzz Magazine; "a terrific film" )
- Limit Up Limit Up – Writer/Director. MCEG. 1989 Jonathan Krane Prod. Nancy Allen, Dean Stockwell, Ray Charles. (Ent. Weekly – "Splendid, delightful, with good cast, good script, tidy direction.")
- You Can't Hurry Love You Can't Hurry Love – Writer/Director. Vestron 1988 J.D. Krane Prod. Bridget Fonda, Charles Grodin. ('Three stars' Chicago Sun Times.)
- Three for the Road – Co-Writer, Story. Vista 1987 Charlie Sheen, Kerri Green. ("A jolly good time" NY Post "Charming" Newsday)
- My Champion – Writer. Chris Mitchum, Yoko Shimada. Directed by Gwen Arner.

=== Documentaries ===
- Hacking the Afterlife - Director. Based on the best-selling Amazon book (2021)
- Talking to Paul Allen, Junior Seau, Dave Duerson - Director. Multiple interviews with CTE victims offstage. (2020)
- Talking to Bill Paxton

- Director. (2019)

- Flipside A Journey into the Afterlife - Director. Based on the best-selling Amazon book (2012)
- Journey into Tibet with Robert Thurman - Director. Tibet House NY. Trip around Mt. Kailash (2006)
- Sister Cities – Director. Layalina Productions. Chicago and Casablanca. (2005)
- Tibetan Refugee – Director. Story of 50 new arrivals in Dharamsala. (2001)
