= Limit Up =

1989 film by Richard Martini

- German VHS artwork
- Directed by: Richard Martini
- Written by: Richard Martini; Luana Anders
- Produced by: Jonathan D. Krane
- Starring: Nancy Allen; Dean Stockwell; Brad Hall; Danitra Vance; Ray Charles
- Cinematography: Peter Lyons Collister
- Edited by: Sonny Baskin
- Music by: John Tesh
- Production company: Management Company Entertainment Group
- Distributed by: Virgin Films
- Release date: November 3, 1989
- Running time: 100 minutes
- Country: United States
- Language: English

Limit Up is a 1989 comedy film starring Nancy Allen as Chicago commodities trader Casey Falls. The film was directed by Richard Martini and produced by Jonathan D. Krane. It was filmed through Chicago and prominently features scenes at the Chicago Board of Trade and Wrigley Field.

Rance Howard, Dean Stockwell, blues icon Ray Charles and Saturday Night Live alumni Danitra Vance and Brad Hall round out the cast. Additionally, actress Sally Kellerman makes a cameo appearance as a nightclub singer. John Tesh scored the film.

== Plot ==
Casey Falls works as a runner at the Board of Trade for a ruthless commodities broker, Peter Oak. It is her ambition to someday become a top trader herself, but Oak condescendingly insists that Casey will never make the grade.

Upset at the lack of opportunities for women, Casey is visited by a spirit, Nike, who angelically gives her tips that result in Casey making millions of dollars for traders like Marty Callahan and Chuck Feeney. In love with her, Marty helps arrange it so that Casey becomes a licensed trader. Her gal pal, (Andy Lincoln) supports Casey's quest to succeed. Before long, with Nike's can't-miss advice, Casey becomes one of the wealthiest women in the business.

However, her attitude changes when Nike abruptly goes from angel to devil and decides to coax Casey into monopolizing world markets and earning so much money that it will wreck the economy of others around the globe. Casey openly rebels, with the help of Marty and a street musician, Julius, who is not what he seems.

== Cast ==
- Nancy Allen as Casey Falls
- Dean Stockwell as Peter Oak
- Brad Hall as Marty Callahan
- Danitra Vance as Nike
- Ray Charles as Julius
- Rance Howard as Chuck Feeney
- Sandra Bogan as Andy Lincoln
- William J. Wolf as Rusty
- Ava Fabian as Sasha
- Robbie Martini as Oak's Assistant
- Teressa Ovetta Burrell as Clerk
- Winifred Freedman as Pit Recorder
- Luana Anders as Teacher
- Richard Martini as Student
- Kellie Joy Beals as Reporter
- Nicky Blair as Maitre d'
- Force MDs as Band
- Sally Kellerman as Nightclub Singer

== Critical response ==
The lighthearted romp received a B+ from Entertainment Weekly: "Splendid with good cast, good script, tidy direction" and "Nancy Allen is particularly delightful."[1] TV Guide noted that director Martini succeeds "in making the commodity-market scenes comprehensible for the layman." The St. Paul Pioneer Press said Limit Up "can't be faulted for enthusiasm or moxie" and its "strong equality-of-women-in-the-workplace message is welcome". Dually, The Chicago Tribune was less complimentary: "the picture is as spunky and good-natured as all get out, but in the absence of any original or substantial ideas, its spunk soon grates." In his Chicago Sun-Times review of Nov. 3, 1989, Roger Ebert described the film as "witless from one end to another" as well as "lame-brained and cornball".
