= Three for the Road (1987 film) =

1987 film by Bill L. Norton

- Official poster
- Directed by: Bill L. Norton
- Written by: Richard Martini (screenplay/story); Tim Metcalfe; Miguel Tejada-Flores
- Produced by: Mort Engelberg; Herb Jaffe
- Starring: Charlie Sheen; Alan Ruck; Kerri Green; Sally Kellerman; Blair Tefkin
- Cinematography: Stephen L. Posey
- Edited by: Christopher Greenbury
- Music by: Barry Goldberg
- Distributed by: New Century-Vista
- Release date: April 10, 1987
- Running time: 88 minutes
- Country: United States
- Language: English
- Box office: $1.5 million

Three for the Road is a 1987 American road comedy film directed by Bill L. Norton and starring Charlie Sheen, Alan Ruck, Kerri Green, Sally Kellerman and Blair Tefkin.

== Plot ==
The film centers around Paul Tracy (Charlie Sheen), a college student and intern to the influential United States Senator Kitteridge (Raymond J. Barry). Paul has political aspirations of his own, and hopes to win the Senator's favor to advance his ambitions of gaining a Congressional seat.

Paul is asked to transport Robin (Kerri Green), the Senator's delinquent daughter, to an institution for girls. He asks his aspiring writer roommate T.S. (Alan Ruck) to come along for the trip. Robin is initially drugged by her father and put nearly unconscious into the back of their car, but as soon as she wakes up she tries everything to escape.

Eventually a romance develops between Robin and Paul, and he begins to take her claims of her father's abuse more seriously. Along the way they pick up Missy Butler (Tefkin), a southern belle interested in T.S.

After Robin escapes again, they manage to find her. Rather than take her unwillingly, they offer to make a detour to locate her estranged mother Blanche (Sally Kellerman), hoping Robin can live with her. Robin agrees to go, but Blanche refuses, clearly out of fear of the repercussions of her powerful ex.

With no other options left, a devastated Robin is taken to the institution, but when Paul sees firsthand the institution's workers' rough treatment of her, he is more determined than ever to break her free, and develops a ruse. Blanche also arrives, demanding to see her daughter, but is turned away at the gate.

However, Paul uses his initial visit to regain entry, which is granted by security. Paul tells Robin he's come to rescue her, but a now despondent Robin has accepted her fate and doesn't want to make things worse. Paul takes her to a window, where she sees Blanche looking gloomily through the fence and in her direction.

Realizing her mother does want her, Robin agrees to allow Paul to help her escape. This is quashed by the unexpected arrival of the Senator, as he questioned Paul's loyalty. Paul rejects the Senator, effectively losing his job.

Blanche drives up to the gate, this time with the intent of taking her daughter with her at all costs. When the Senator threatens to have her arrested, she in turn threatens to expose his dastardly deeds (likely with information provided by Paul and Robin), including the rape of a babysitter. The Senator tries to reason with Blanche, but is interrupted by her sucker punch to his jaw.

As the group drives out of the institution, all of the girls there stage a mass escape from the facility and the staff make a largely futile attempt to stop them. The movie ends with Robin, Paul, Blanche, T.S. and Missy driving out into the open road to start a new and happy life.

== Reception ==
The film was a critical and commercial dud, grossing approximately $1.5 million in the United States. The film effectively ended the mainstream acting careers of Kerri Green and Alan Ruck, who had been rising Hollywood stars whose past projects were huge successes (Ruck in Ferris Bueller's Day Off and Green in Lucas and The Goonies). Ruck would continue acting in smaller roles until cast in the TV show Spin City (opposite Sheen in later seasons); Green, who had played the romantic lead to Sheen in Lucas, has not appeared in a mainstream film since. (Also, director Bill L. Norton, who helmed the cult classic Cisco Pike, did not direct another feature film.)

Writer Richard Martini has asserted that the screenplay was dramatically altered from his original. Instead of being a rebellious troublemaker, the character of Robin was shunned by her conservative Republican Senator father because she was an outspoken liberal activist who stages protests. When she finally finds her birth mother she discovers that she was a drug addict who never wanted a child. Martini paid a visit to the set and met Sheen who said "Forget it – the reason I did this movie was I loved your script, but they've re-written it and it sucks now." Martini was then not invited to a screening and instead saw the film in a 3,000-seat theater with only 8 people in attendance. Martini discusses these experiences on both his own website and in an entry at the IMDb.

The theme song "We Got Our Love" is performed by actress/singer Holly Robinson. A soundtrack was issued (on vinyl only), but due to the failure of the film it too bombed.

== Home media ==
After the film's theatrical run, it was released on video cassette by Vista Home Video and later in 1991 by Avid Home Entertainment in the EP Mode.
