= John Schwartzman =

American cinematographer

- Education: USC School of Cinematic Arts
- Years active: 1984–present
- Relatives: Coppola family
- Website: johnschwartzmandp.com

John Leonard Schwartzman, A.S.C. is an American cinematographer, best known for his work in blockbusters like Armageddon, The Amazing Spider-Man and Jurassic World, as well as for active collaborations with directors John Lee Hancock and Paul Feig.

== Early life ==
He is the son of producer Jack Schwartzman and the stepson of actress Talia Shire. He is the brother of Stephanie Schwartzman and half-brother to actors/musicians Jason Schwartzman and Robert Schwartzman.

Schwartzman graduated from the University of Southern California School of Cinematic Arts in 1985.

== Style ==
Schwartzman prefers shooting on film stock over digital cinematography, claiming to have conducted blind experiments with filmmaking professionals, comparing various digital and film camera formats, with the result being a unanimous preference for the 35mm Panavision anamorphic format.

== Filmography ==
=== Feature film ===
Year	Title	Director	Notes
1988	You Can't Hurry Love	Richard Martini	With Peter Lyons Collister
1989	Red Surf	H. Gordon Boos	
1990	Rockula	Luca Bercovici	
1993	Benny & Joon	Jeremiah S. Chechik	
1994	Airheads	Michael Lehmann	
1995	A Pyromaniac's Love Story	Joshua Brand	
1996	Mr. Wrong	Nick Castle	
1996	The Rock	Michael Bay	
1997	Conspiracy Theory	Richard Donner	
1998	Armageddon	Michael Bay	
1999	EDtv	Ron Howard	
2001	Pearl Harbor	Michael Bay	
2002	The Rookie	John Lee Hancock	1st collaboration with Hancock
2003	Seabiscuit	Gary Ross	
2004	Meet the Fockers	Jay Roach	
2007	National Treasure: Book of Secrets	Jon Turteltaub	With Amir Mokri
2007	The Bucket List	Rob Reiner	
2009	Night at the Museum: Battle of the Smithsonian	Shawn Levy	
2011	The Green Hornet	Michel Gondry	
2012	The Amazing Spider-Man	Marc Webb	
2013	Saving Mr. Banks	John Lee Hancock	
2014	Dracula Untold	Gary Shore	
2015	Jurassic World	Colin Trevorrow	
2016	The Founder	John Lee Hancock	
2017	Fifty Shades Darker	James Foley	
2017	The Book of Henry	Colin Trevorrow	
2018	Fifty Shades Freed	James Foley	
2018	The Unicorn	Robert Schwartzman	With Michael Rizzi
2018	A Simple Favor	Paul Feig	1st collaboration with Feig
2019	The Highwaymen	John Lee Hancock	
2019	Last Christmas	Paul Feig	
2021	The Little Things	John Lee Hancock	
2022	Jurassic World Dominion	Colin Trevorrow	
2022	Mr. Harrigan's Phone	John Lee Hancock	
2022	The School for Good and Evil	Paul Feig	
2024	Atlas	Brad Peyton	
2024	Jackpot!	Paul Feig	
2025	Another Simple Favor	Paul Feig	
2025	The Housemaid	Paul Feig	
2027	Monsanto	John Lee Hancock	

=== Television ===
TV movies

Year	Title	Director
1991	To Save a Child	Robert Lieberman
1992	Industrial Symphony No. 1	David Lynch

TV series

Year	Title	Director	Episodes
2025	Talamasca: The Secret Order	John Lee Hancock	"We Watch. And We Are Always There."
2025	Talamasca: The Secret Order	John Lee Hancock	"A Wilderness of Mirrors"

=== Music video ===
Year	Title	Artist(s)	Director
1990	"Can't Stop Fallin' into Love"	Cheap Trick	Nigel Dick
1990	"Wherever Would I Be"	Cheap Trick	Nigel Dick
1994	"Rock and Roll Dreams Come Through"	Meat Loaf	Michael Bay
1995	"Strange Currencies"	R.E.M.	Mark Romanek
1999	"What a Girl Wants"	Christina Aguilera	Diane Martel
2012	"One More Night"	Maroon 5	Peter Berg

== Awards and nominations ==
Year	Award	Category	Title	Result
2003	Academy Awards	Best Cinematography	Seabiscuit	Nominated
2001	American Society of Cinematographers	Outstanding Cinematography	Pearl Harbor	Nominated
2003	American Society of Cinematographers	Outstanding Cinematography	Seabiscuit	Won
2001	Satellite Awards	Best Cinematography	Pearl Harbor	Nominated
2003	Satellite Awards	Best Cinematography	Seabiscuit	Nominated
