= Blue Flame (film) =

1993 American science fiction film

- Directed by: Cassian Elwes
- Written by: Cassian Elwes
- Starring: Charley Hayward; Jad Mager; Kerri Green
- Cinematography: Daniele Massaccesi
- Edited by: John Lafferty
- Music by: George Adrian; Tyler Bates
- Release date: 1993
- Country: United States
- Language: English

Blue Flame is a 1993 American independent sci-fi film written and directed by Cassian Elwes, starring Kerri Green as one of two seductive aliens who live inside the head of a renegade police officer.

== Plot ==
Turner is a police officer whose life and marriage is torn apart when his daughter goes missing. The two aliens believed responsible, Fire and Rain, are put in cryogenic suspension. Two years later they escape and Turner must travel through time and alternate realities to uncover the truth of what happened to his daughter.

== Cast ==
- Charley Hayward as Turner
- Jad Mager as Fire
- Kerri Green as Rain
- Brian Wimmer as Flemming
- Joel Brooks as Morgan
- Cecilia Peck as Jessie

== Production ==
Elwes wrote the script during a period of four days, while he was recovering from surgery. The film was completed on a budget of approximately $150,000.

== Release ==
Some publications list Blue Flame as releasing in 1993; the film also has a release date of 1995.

== Reception ==
Critical reception for the film has been negative, with common elements of criticism focusing on the script, character cliches, and acting. Emanuel Levy reviewed Blue Flame for Variety, criticizing it as "a dull, incongruous sci-fi pic that is comically wrong in almost every way." Clive Davies was also critical about the film in his book Spinegrinder, calling it a "pathetic excuse for a movie" and citing the script and character cliches as issues with Blue Flame.
