= The Guests (The Outer Limits) =

- The Outer Limits episode
- Episode no.: Season 1 Episode 26
- Directed by: Paul Stanley
- Written by: Donald S. Sanford
- Cinematography by: Kenneth Peach
- Production code: 29
- Original air date: March 23, 1964

Guest appearances
- Geoffrey Horne; Nellie Burt; Vaughn Taylor; Luana Anders; Gloria Grahame

Episode chronology
← Previous "The Mutant"	Next → "Fun and Games"

"The Guests" is an episode of the original The Outer Limits television show. It first aired on March 23, 1964, during the first season.

== Introduction ==
A free-spirited, young man is forced against his will to walk up the stairs in an old house to a room where he encounters an alien being.

== Plot ==
Wade Norton, a young drifter, finds an old man dying by the side of a remote country road. He picks up the man's pocketwatch, which contains a large photo of a young woman. Seeking help, he enters a mansion he sees on the hill, whose inhabitants are surprisingly unhelpful but uncannily curious about the age of the man whom he found. With the exception of a soulful young woman whose image is in the watch, all seem mean-spirited and uninterested.

Trying to leave through the front door, Norton is forced backward and upstairs by a mysterious compulsion to discover that the house is the lair of an amorphous, gelatinous alien being who is keeping the group of desperate humans suspended in time until it can comprehend the disposition of humanity. It interrogates him then returns him to the group residing in the house where he is to learn the reason for their captivity.

The young woman, knowing the potential fate of the drifter, leads Norton to an escape route, which is through a gate attached to a small cemetery plot accessible from the mansion. However, she discloses to him that she cannot accompany him through the gate because all her years will catch up with her, and she will die. Thus, the drifter chooses to remain with her in spite of the warnings. As she realizes he will be trapped among them for eternity, she departs through the gate herself and, having eschewed her protection from the passage of time, withers and turns to dust. The observing alien has found the factors missing in its equation: love and self-sacrifice. Releasing Norton, who has discovered in himself hope, it proceeds to deconstruct the house and destroy its tenants. The mansion returns momentarily to its true appearance, that of an enormous brain, and then disappears.

== Notes ==
This episode has no opening or closing narration by the Control Voice.

== Background ==
Donald S. Sanford was hired by Lou Morheim on the strength of his work on the Boris Karloff anthology series Thriller, for which he had scripted fifteen episodes including "The Incredible Dr. Markesan" and "The Cheaters", as Joseph Stefano had been looking for story material with a heavy emphasis on the Gothic to provide director Curtis Harrington with an Outer Limits episode. (Harrington had directed the low-budget film Night Tide, an offbeat version of the Lorelei myth, in 1961 which had impressed Stefano.) A script by Charles Beaumont was given to Sanford for revision, though in the end Sanford came up with his own more Gothic plot, Harrington backed out and Paul Stanley directed.

Charles Beaumont, who had written many memorable episodes of The Twilight Zone, sold Joseph Stefano a script titled "An Ordinary Town" (dated Jan 3 1964), which was quite similar to a Twilight Zone episode he had written the previous year titled "Valley of the Shadow", in which a newspaper man, Philip Redfield, is trapped in an isolated rural town that keeps the benefits of a wondrous technology (possibly brought by aliens) to itself. In " An Ordinary Town," Redfield is replaced with two protagonists, and the alien influence becomes a gigantic brain controlling the town. The only element carried over from Beaumont's script to Sanford's is the shot of the enormous brain sitting atop a hill where a mansion should be. Everything else in "The Guests" is Sanford's own story.

Sanford's script needed so little revision that Stefano neglected to add on the customary Control Voice speeches.

== Cast ==
- Geoffrey Horne – as Wade Norton
- Luana Anders – as Theresa Ames
- Nellie Burt – as Ethel Latimer
- Vaughn Taylor – as Randall Latimer
- Gloria Grahame – as Florida Patton
- Burt Mustin – as Old Man (uncredited)
- Robert Johnson – as voice of Alien (uncredited)
