= My Bollywood Bride =

- Theatrical poster
- Directed by: Rajeev Virani
- Written by: Brad Listermann; Richard Martini; Kashmira Shah
- Produced by: Brad Listermann; Dr. Daljit Buttar; Duncan Clark; Douglas Falconer; Ruchi Gupta; Harit Kapedia; Richard Martini; Ashok Rao; Balwinder Bajaj
- Starring: Jason Lewis; Kashmera Shah
- Music by: Anu Malik
- Distributed by: Hiskarma Productions; Dream Team Films
- Release dates: 22 March 2007 (India); 8 June 2007 (U.S.)
- Running time: 95 minutes
- Countries: India; United States
- Language: English

My Bollywood Bride (alternatively titled My Faraway Bride) is a 2007 Indian English language film directed by Rajeev Virani and written by Richard Martini. Written and produced by Brad Listermann, it stars Jason Lewis and Kashmera Shah in pivotal roles. The film features Hindi songs.

== Plot ==
Alex (Jason Lewis), living in Venice Beach, is a struggling writer. One day, he meets Reena (Kashmera Shah) at the beach. They spend time together, and Alex starts to fall in love with her. However, some days later, Reena disappears at LAX. The only thing Alex knows about her is that she's from Thakur Village, Mumbai, India, so he follows her there. In India, he discovers, with the help of his new driver Priyad (Ash Chandler), that Reena is the greatest film star of Bollywood and engaged to Shekar, an influential Bollywood producer. Alex stays with Bobby K. (Sanjay Suri), a friend of Reena and a big Bollywood actor himself. While Alex is struggling with his own romance, Bobby starts to fall for his choreographer, Alisha (Neha Dubey), an old friend from his past. He is very disappointed by simply forgetting about her when he became famous. Reena, hesitant to break off an engagement arranged by her parents, feels that she owes Shekhar her entire career, while Alex is struggling with Reena's mother and Shekhar himself, who both feel that Reena and Alex might be too interested in each other. Bobby K. Meanwhile, after a broken car gets stuck with Alisha in some abandoned hut at the beach, they have an opportunity to talk and make up; however, shortly afterward, a misunderstanding occurs, and Alisha feels betrayed all over again. Reena, meanwhile, tells Alex to leave, as she is going to accept her family's wishes and will marry Shekhar in order to preserve the tradition of an arranged marriage. Alex is all ready to leave India, and Bobby finds out that Shekhar is having an affair with a co-worker (the entire affair is caught on CD). Reena's parents tell her not to give up her happiness and tell her to go after Alex. Bobby clarifies the misunderstanding between him and Alisha and makes her pursue her dreams, and Reena stops Alex from leaving the country after a rickshaw chase. Everything ends well, and Reena and Alex, after professing their love for each other, get married.

== Cast ==
- Jason Lewis as Alex Kincaid
- Kashmera Shah as Reena Khanna
- Madhuri Bhatia as Reena's mother
- Gulshan Grover as Shekar Singh
- Sanjay Suri as Bobby
- Neha Dubey as Alisha
- Ash Chandler as Priyad
- Deepak Qazir as Reena's father
- Sean O'Brien Teague as Sean "Shekhar"'s bodyguard
- Vineet Wadhwa as Ravi

== Release ==
It premiered at the Palm Springs International Film Festival on 14 January 2006 ahead of its theatrical release. Variety wrote that "Nevertheless, this genial, spirited comedy has enough going for it to make it worth seeing.".
