= The Gift (The Twilight Zone) =

- The Twilight Zone episode
- Episode no.: Season 3 Episode 32
- Directed by: Allen H. Miner
- Written by: Rod Serling (Based on his original script "I Shot an Arrow Into the Air".)
- Production code: 4830
- Original air date: April 27, 1962

Guest appearances
- Geoffrey Horne: Williams; Nico Minardos: Doctor; Edmund Vargas: Pedro; Cliff Osmond: Manolo; Paul Mazursky: Captain; Vladimir Sokoloff: Guitarist (Ignacio); Vito Scotti: Rudolpho; Carmen D'Antonio: Woman #1; Henry Corden: Sanchez; Lea Marmer: Woman #2; Joe Perry: Man #1; David Fresco: Man #2

Episode chronology
← Previous "The Trade-Ins"	Next → "The Dummy"
- The Twilight Zone (1959 TV series) (season 3)

"The Gift" is episode 97 of the American television anthology series The Twilight Zone.

== Opening narration ==
The place is Mexico, just across the Texas border, a mountain village held back in time by its remoteness and suddenly intruded upon by the twentieth century. And this is Pedro, nine years old, a lonely, rootless little boy, who will soon make the acquaintance of a traveler from a distant place. We are at present forty miles from the Rio Grande, but any place and all places can be the Twilight Zone.

== Plot ==
A humanoid alien has just crash-landed outside a mountain village in Mexico, just across the border from Texas. He has accidentally killed a police officer and was wounded by another. When he reaches a village bar, he collapses. A sympathetic doctor operates on him, removing two bullets from his chest. The alien (who refers to himself as "Mr. Williams") becomes friends with Pedro, an orphan whose job is to clean the bar. Pedro receives a gift from Williams, who tells Pedro that he will explain it later.

Meanwhile, the bartender notifies the army about Williams' location. Williams attempts to escape back to his ship, but soldiers and villagers corner him. He tries to explain that he has come in peace and that the police officer getting shot was an accident. He tells Pedro to show the gift to the doctor, but the villagers take the gift from him and set it on fire, claiming that it must be black magic or of the devil. As the villagers watch Pedro and Williams reaching for each other, fear drives them to shoot Williams before they believe he has a chance to harm the boy. With Williams lying dead, the doctor picks up the remains of the gift from the fire. He reads the note on it aloud: "Greetings to the people of Earth: We come as friends and in peace. We bring you this gift. The following chemical formula is...a vaccine against all forms of cancer..." The rest is burned away.

The doctor states, "We have not just killed a man; we have killed a dream."

== Closing narration ==
Madeiro, Mexico, the present. The subject: fear. The cure: a little more faith. An Rx off a shelf in the Twilight Zone.
