= The Two Jakes =

1990 film by Jack Nicholson

- Theatrical release poster by Robert Rodriguez
- Directed by: Jack Nicholson
- Written by: Robert Towne
- Based on: Characters by: Robert Towne; Roman Polanski
- Produced by: Robert Evans; Harold Schneider
- Starring: Jack Nicholson; Harvey Keitel; Meg Tilly; Madeleine Stowe; Eli Wallach; Rubén Blades; Frederic Forrest; David Keith; Richard Farnsworth
- Cinematography: Vilmos Zsigmond
- Edited by: Anne Goursaud
- Music by: Van Dyke Parks
- Distributed by: Paramount Pictures
- Release date: August 10, 1990
- Running time: 138 minutes
- Country: United States
- Language: English
- Budget: $25 million
- Box office: $10 million

The Two Jakes is a 1990 American neo-noir mystery film and the sequel to the 1974 film Chinatown. Directed by and starring Jack Nicholson, who reprises his role of J.J. “Jake” Gittes from the first film, the cast also features Harvey Keitel, Meg Tilly, Madeleine Stowe, Richard Farnsworth, Frederic Forrest, David Keith, Rubén Blades, Tracey Walter and Eli Wallach. Also reprising their roles from Chinatown are Joe Mantell, Perry Lopez, James Hong, and, in a brief voice-over, Faye Dunaway. The musical score for the film is by Van Dyke Parks, who also appears as a prosecuting attorney.

Set a decade after the first film, The Two Jakes follows private investigator Gittes as he becomes embroiled in a web of corruption, adultery, and murder involving a client, also named Jake. The deeper he goes, the more he realizes that the events may be related to the events surrounding Evelyn Mulwray ten years prior.

The Two Jakes faced a troubled production and went through several years of development hell. Various actors were attached at several points, including Joe Pesci and Roy Scheider, with screenwriter Robert Towne also at one point set to direct and producer Robert Evans set to co-star. Filming finally took place with Nicholson at the helm, filming around Los Angeles in the early summer of 1989.

The film was released by Paramount Pictures on August 10, 1990. It received mixed reviews and was not a box office success, and plans for a third film, with Gittes near the end of his life, were abandoned.

== Plot ==
In 1948 Los Angeles, businessman Julius "Jake" Berman hires seasoned private investigator J. J. "Jake" Gittes to catch his wife, Kitty, committing adultery. During the sting, Berman unexpectedly kills his wife's lover, Mark Bodine, who is also his partner in a real estate development company. Gittes, unaware of this, suddenly finds himself being scrutinized for his role in what appears to be a premeditated murder; the key piece of evidence is a wire recording that Gittes made, which captured the illicit encounter, the confrontation, and Bodine being killed. However, the recording left it unclear whether Berman intended to kill Bodine before confronting him, making it murder, or if the killing was a spontaneous act of jealousy, possibly qualifying as "temporary insanity", which is a defense of murder.

Gittes is forced to convince Los Angeles Police Department Captain Lou Escobar, an old acquaintance, that he should not be charged as an accomplice. Oddly, Berman seems unconcerned that he may be charged with murder. Gittes has the recording, which Berman's attorney, Cotton Weinberger, and mobster friend Mickey Nice, both want; it is locked in Gittes' office safe.

Earthquakes have recently rocked the area, including Berman's housing development in the Valley. Gittes is nearly killed in a gas explosion, waking to find Berman and Kitty standing over him.

Gittes has a confrontation, and a later sexual encounter, with Lilian Bodine, the dead man's angry widow. He is presented with proof that Earl Rawley, a wealthy and ruthless oil man, may be drilling under the Bodine and Berman development, though Rawley denies doing so. Gittes focuses his attention on determining who owns the mineral rights to the land, and eventually discovers that they are owned by Katherine Mulwray, the daughter of the late Evelyn Mulwray, his love interest from eleven years prior. He also discovers that the deed transfers were executed in a manner to attempt to hide Katherine Mulwray's prior ownership and continued claim of the mineral rights. He also finds out that Katherine's grandfather Noah Cross, who is also her birth father, has since died and left her all his assets.

Gittes receives word from his associates that Berman has been seen with a blond woman, along with Mickey and a bodyguard. Gittes determines that the woman is an oncologist and is treating Berman for cancer. Gittes confronts Berman with this knowledge and gets a full confession: his cancer is terminal and will die soon. He has taken steps to ensure that Kitty will be financially secure once he dies.

To persuade Kitty to talk to him, Gittes works to prove that her husband did set out to kill his partner. Once accomplished, Kitty agrees to meet Gittes and tell him what she knows about Berman. In the process of discussing Berman's possible motivations, mineral rights, and the possible whereabouts of Katherine, it is revealed that Kitty and Katherine are the same person. Kitty reveals that she never suspected that her husband was dying.

Gittes holds onto the recording, refusing to let anyone hear it until the inquest. Gittes edits the recording, omitting Kitty's name and making other alterations to indicate Bodine's death was not premeditated. The court quickly drops all charges against Berman. Realizing Gittes is aware of his terminal illness and knowing the model house he is in is filling with natural gas, Berman asks Gittes and Mickey to leave so he can "have a smoke". As they drive off, the house explodes. With no remains left to recover, the police make no attempt to investigate his death and Kitty inherits a substantial sum from her late husband.

The story ends with Kitty and Gittes in his office. They speak of regrets, and Kitty kisses Gittes, who rejects her advances. She leaves, telling him to occasionally think of her. Gittes responds that the past never goes away.

== Cast ==
- Jack Nicholson as Jake Gittes
- Harvey Keitel as Julius "Jake" Berman
- Meg Tilly as Katherine "Kitty" Berman
- Madeleine Stowe as Lillian Bodine
- Eli Wallach as Cotton Weinberger
- Rubén Blades as Michael "Mickey Nice" Weisskopf
- Frederic Forrest as Chuck Newty
- David Keith as Det. Lt. Loach
- Richard Farnsworth as Earl Rawley
- Tracey Walter as Tyrone Otley
- Joe Mantell as Lawrence Walsh
- James Hong as Kahn
- Perry Lopez as Capt. Lou Escobar
- Jeff Morris as Ralph Tilton
- Rebecca Broussard as Gladys
- Rosie Vela as Linda
- Van Dyke Parks as Francis Hannah
- Pia Grønning as Dr. Elsa Branchauer
- Luana Anders as Florist

Faye Dunaway briefly reprises her role as Evelyn Mulwray via a voiceover cameo. Tom Waits makes an uncredited appearance as a plainclothes detective.

== Production ==
Made 16 years after its predecessor, The Two Jakes had a very troubled production, and went through several iterations.

=== Under Robert Towne ===
Producer Robert Evans had the rights to a Chinatown sequel, and in 1976 had negotiated for Jack Nicholson to reprise his role and Dustin Hoffman to act alongside him; that version eventually fell through. Screenwriter Robert Towne finished the script for The Two Jakes in 1984 and was set to direct, but he objected to Evans's wish to act in the film in the Jake Berman role. Nicholson, Evans, and Towne had formed their own production company to make the film independently, and entered into a distribution deal with Paramount Pictures. The trio agreed to not take up-front salaries, and instead share in the film's profits. Paramount greenlit a $12–13 million budget, and capped its distribution fee at $6 million.

In April 1985, Kelly McGillis, Cathy Moriarty, Dennis Hopper, Joe Pesci, and Harvey Keitel had all been cast, ready to shoot the film that month. The following month, the sets had been built and filming was ready to begin, but Towne's lack of confidence in Evans's acting ability exploded into a final argument when Evans objected to having to get a 1940s-style haircut (mostly due to recent plastic surgery scars that would be visible). Filming was scheduled to begin four days after the confrontation, with a witness telling Vanity Fair: "In the morning, nothing happened. They said the weather was wrong. But you could tell the plug had been pulled". On top of existing problems between Nicholson, Towne, and Evans, grievances were filed by 120 crew members who had not been paid (over $500,000 from Screen Actors Guild and Directors Guild of America members, and $1.5 million from suppliers of sets, props, costumes, and sound stages), and the project was officially postponed indefinitely.

Because the film had not been budgeted normally due to the initial Evans–Towne–Nicholson plan, Towne approached producer Dino De Laurentiis for help in financing it. McGillis remained in the cast, with Harrison Ford set to take over as Jake Gittes and Roy Scheider attached to play the other Jake, with a tentative start date of mid-1986. At one point director John Huston, who co-starred in the original film, was rumored to be brought in as director, although Towne denied the claim. However, the constant shuffling worried Paramount, who withdrew from the distribution deal, eventually taking a $4 million loss on the film.

Briefly, The Cannon Group tried to buy the film for financing after Paramount had tried to put the film into turnaround, only for Cannon to lose the rights, which would eventually revert to Paramount.

=== Under Jack Nicholson ===
The project was discontinued until the late 1980s, when Nicholson took on the responsibility of directing and also rewrote parts of Towne's script (which "was really only about 80% ready").

Filming began in Los Angeles on April 18, 1989, lasting through July 26. Numerous scenes had to be reshot after initial filming had wrapped, causing the release date to get pushed from Christmas 1989 to August 1990. Nicholson insisted that it came in "perfectly on schedule and perfectly on budget" – the final cost was about $25 million.

The film broke up relations between Nicholson, Towne, and Evans, with Towne saying in 1998 that he had not spoken to Nicholson in over ten years, and Evans checking into a hospital for mental health and substance abuse issues.

== Reception ==
=== Box office ===
Unlike its predecessor, the film was not a box-office success. It made $3.7 million from 1,206 theaters in its first weekend, finishing in seventh, then $1.8 million and $1.9 million in its second and third weekends, finishing 16th both times; it ended its theatrical run with $10 million at the box office, just over one third of the original.

=== Critical response ===
On Rotten Tomatoes the film holds an approval rating of 59% based on 32 reviews, with an average rating of 5.9/10. On Metacritic, the film has a weighted average score of 56 out of 100, based on 17 critics, indicating "mixed or average reviews". Audiences polled by CinemaScore gave the film an average grade of "C+" on an A+ to F scale.

Roger Ebert gave the film 3.5 out of 4 stars, writing that "every scene falls into place like clockwork [...] exquisite". Vincent Canby, writing for The New York Times, called it "an enjoyable if clunky movie". Variety called the film "a jumbled, obtuse yet not entirely unsatisfying follow-up to Chinatown". Desson Howe, for The Washington Post, wrote that "at best, the movie comes across as a competently assembled job, a wistful tribute to its former self. At worst, it's wordy, confusing and – here's an ugly word – boring".

== Canceled sequel ==
Screenwriter Robert Towne originally planned a trilogy involving private investigator J. J. Gittes. According to Nicholson, the third film, titled Gittes vs. Gittes, was "meant to be set in 1968 when no-fault divorce went into effect in California". After The Two Jakes was a commercial failure, plans for a third film were scrapped.
