= Rick Johnson (quarterback) =

American gridiron football player (born 1961)

No. 16
- Position: Quarterback

Personal information
- Born: January 21, 1961 (age 65); Wheaton, Illinois, U.S.

Career information
- College: Southern Illinois
- NFL draft: 1984: 2nd round, 48th overall pick

Career history
- 1984–1985: Oklahoma/Arizona Outlaws
- 1985–1988: Calgary Stampeders
- 1989: Toronto Argonauts

Awards and highlights
- CFL All-Star (1986)

Rick Johnson (born January 2, 1961) is a former all-star quarterback in the Canadian Football League (CFL).

Johnson played college football for the Southern Illinois Salukis, where he was starting quarterback on the team that won the 1983 NCAA Division I-AA Football Championship Game. He was picked in the second round of the 1984 Supplemental Draft by the Los Angeles Rams. He played in the United States Football League for the Oklahoma/Arizona Outlaws in 1984. He moved to Canada in 1985, and played for the Calgary Stampeders. He was a CFL All-Star in 1986.

After retiring from football, Johnson became an actor and movie director. He starred in the 1995 thriller film Point of Betrayal as a man trying to drive his mother insane in order to take her money away. Johnson also had a small role in the 1996 film Jerry Maguire as a client that a slick sports agent attempts to hug. He directed the 2001 comedy-drama film Rustin, also co-starring in the film as a former professional football player working as a sheriff in a fictional Alabama town named Rustin.
