= KGB: The Secret War =

- Home video release poster
- Directed by: Dwight H. Little
- Written by: Sandra K. Bailey
- Produced by: Sandy Howard; Keith Rubinstein
- Starring: Sally Kellerman; Michael Billington
- Cinematography: Peter Lyons Collister
- Edited by: Stanley Sheff; John Peterson
- Music by: Misha Segal
- Production company: Cinema Group
- Distributed by: Concorde Cinema Group
- Release date: November 1, 1985
- Running time: 89 minutes
- Country: United States
- Language: English

KGB: The Secret War is a 1985 American film directed by Dwight H. Little, his theatrical debut.

== Plot ==
A spy thriller about a KGB agent operating inside the U.S. who wants to defect. The agent steals top secret computer microchips as barter material to switch sides and is hunted by a U.S. agent.

== Cast ==
- Michael Billington as Peter Hubbard
- Denise DuBarry as Adèle Martin
- Michael Ansara as Lyman Taylor
- Walter Gotell as Nicholai
- Sally Kellerman as Fran Simpson
- Christopher Cary as Alex Stafanac
- Philip Levien as Ryder
- Julian Barnes as Hya Koslov
- Paul Linke as Frank
- Richard Pachorek as Martine
- Gerrod Miskovsky as Theodor
- Kim Joseph as Shirley Marks

== Release ==
The film's theatrical release was curtailed following the bankruptcy of producer Sandy Howard but was released on home video.
