= You Can't Hurry Love (film) =

- Directed by: Richard Martini
- Written by: Richard Martini
- Produced by: Jonathan D. Krane; Simon R. Lewis; Lawrence Kasanoff; William J. Rouhana Jr. Anthony Santa Croce; Ellen Steloff
- Starring: David Leisure; Scott McGinnis; Anthony Geary; Bridget Fonda; Frank Bonner; Lu Leonard; Merete Van Kamp; David Packer; Charles Grodin; Sally Kellerman; Kristy McNichol
- Cinematography: Peter Lyons Collister; John Schwartzman
- Edited by: Richard Candib
- Music by: Bob Esty
- Production company: Vestron Pictures
- Distributed by: Lightning Pictures
- Release date: January 20, 1988
- Running time: 92 minutes
- Country: United States
- Language: English
- Box office: $9,333,152 (US)

You Can't Hurry Love is a 1988 American romantic comedy film written and directed by Richard Martini and starring David Leisure, Scott McGinnis, Anthony Geary, and Bridget Fonda.

A man moves to Los Angeles and hears that "the only way to be successful in Los Angeles is to pretend to be someone else." He goes on a series of video dates and learns that everyone he meets is pretending to be someone else except for the girl who works at the dating service; he realizes the only way to find love is to be himself.

== Plot ==
Eddie Hayes is a newcomer to Los Angeles who seeks to take a job to re-start his life after he is left at the altar in his Ohio home town. His slacker cousin Skip sets him up with a job interview at an advertising company, headed by the eccentric Peter Newcomb.

Peter instead hooks Eddie up with his half-brother Tony, at a beach-side surfboard shop handing out flyers. Eddie immediately comes across many eccentric people, Tony included.

Eddie literally bumps into Peggy Kellogg, who flirts with him and gives him a card for the dating service she works for. Seeing Skip on the boardwalk, he calls him out for the bogus job. His cousin insists he has got to fake it until he makes it.

As he is working, Eddie tries to connect with women, but is shut down continually. When he collects his first paycheck, he tries to convince Peter to promote him, but is unsuccessful.

To get close to Peggy, Eddie goes into Video Valentine. He soon puts himself in front of the camera to try to pick up a potential girlfriend for himself to settle down with. As he goes on a series of disastrous blind dates with various women, each one is stranger than the last.

The first, who sports a Madonna look, clearly hopes that Eddie can make her famous. As he waits for her on the porch, her father suggests he use a condom with her, and provides one. She straddles him in his mini convertible, pretending they have sex. She gives him her head shot, in case the supposed director has any parts for her.

Eddie redoes his video, this time as a rocker. The next date is with performance artist Rhonda. She dresses him up to take him to a club, where they endure several strange acts. Once outside again, as Rhonda is speaking with someone, someone else chloroforms Eddie. Waking up at Rhonda's, after telling her about looking for someone to settle down with, she chews him out for his antiquated ideas, points a crossbow at him as he runs out, capturing it on video.

Eddie's parents show up unannounced, but fortunately Skip pretends he is filming a special candid camera program, so they are less scandalized by what they see. Eddie tries to change his next date attempt with Monique, but she insists on tagging along to dinner with his parents. In the restaurant, she follows him into the restroom and tries to have sex with him in front of the attendant. Eddie manages to get them out. After his parents leave, the exhibitionist Monique takes him inside a shop, gets him to dress up then try to have sex with her in a shop window.

Arrested, after his parents bail Eddy out they leave, in a huff. Skip's parents find out though them about his shenanigans and cut him off.

At a party held at the apartment by the advertising firm, Eddy is introduced to an ad exec and promoted. His latest date believes he is loaded, but still goes along with being intimate with him. However, a bigger, older man she has been dating barges in, giving Eddie a black eye.

Eddie does a final video, in which he is frank and truthful about looking for love. Many women respond, including Peggy. The recently employed Skip, now a limo driver, takes him to the church where he thinks Peggy is getting married. She is actually maid of honor, so accepts his date proposal and they kiss.

== Cast ==
- David Leisure as Newcomb
- Scott McGinnis as Skip
- Anthony Geary as Tony
- Bridget Fonda as Peggy
- Frank Bonner as Chuck Hayes
- Lu Leonard as Miss Frigget
- Merete Van Kamp as Monique
- David Packer as Eddie
- Charles Grodin as Mr. Glerman
- Sally Kellerman as Kelly Bones
- Kristy McNichol as Rhonda
- Luana Anders as Macie Hayes
- Jake Steinfeld as Sparky
- Judy Balduzzi as Glenda
- Danitza Kingsley as Tracey

== Home media ==
The film has been released on DVD by Lions Gate Home Entertainment as a double feature with Love Hurts.
