= She'll Be Sweet =

- Directed by: Gene Levitt
- Written by: Colin Free
- Produced by: Geoffrey Daniels
- Starring: Tony Lo Bianco; Sally Kellerman; Anne Semler; Rod Mullinar
- Music by: Kevin Johnson
- Production company: Transatlantic Enterprises
- Distributed by: ABC
- Release date: 1978
- Running time: 92 mins
- Country: Australia
- Language: English

She'll Be Sweet is a 1978 Australian television film.

The film was also known as Magee and the Lady. It was the sixth and last television film made by the ABC in association with Transatlantic Enterprises.

== Plot ==
Captain Magee is a sailor whose boat is bought from under him by a millionaire tycoon. He tries to find the tycoon with the help of the tycoon's daughter.

== Cast ==
- Tony Lo Bianco
- Sally Kellerman
- Anne Semler
- Rod Mullinar

== Production ==
Filming started in Sydney on 31 October 1977.

== Reception ==
The Sydney Morning Herald wrote that "Colin Free's script is indeed clever. He has given Lo Bianco and Kellerman some of the funniest banter heard in a long time." Another critic in the same paper called it "the last (one fervently hopes) of its disastrous Pelexmovies...in this travesty of a B-rated western, an improbable script saw the improbable hero and heroine (both American let it be noted not Australian) simulating The Perils and Pauline in an improbable Hunter Valley."

Another review in the same paper said " plot is improbable and unconvincing... The movie's tacit acceptance of his immorality is distasteful. Then we're asked to believe the scruffy seafarer and his shrewish captive fall irresistibly and dfreamily in love. As Bob Hawke might say, "Balderdash"."
