= The Lay of the Land (film) =

- Directed by: Larry Arrick
- Screenplay by: Mel Shapiro
- Based on: The Lay of the Land by Mel Shapiro
- Produced by: Sally Kellerman; Jonathan D. Krane
- Starring: Sally Kellerman; Ed Begley Jr.
- Cinematography: Fred Goodich
- Edited by: Richard S. Brummer
- Music by: Jeff Lass
- Production company: JKG Productions
- Distributed by: Northern Acts Entertainment
- Release date: September 26, 1997
- Running time: 94 minutes
- Country: United States
- Language: English

The Lay of the Land is a 1997 American comedy-drama film written by Mel Shapiro, directed by Larry Arrick and starring Sally Kellerman and Ed Begley Jr. It is based on Shapiro's play of the same name.

== Cast ==
- Sally Kellerman as Mary Jane Dankworth
- Ed Begley Jr. as Harvey Dankworth
- Sandra Taylor as Muriel Johanson
- Stuart Margolin as Carmine Ficcone
- Tyne Daly as Dr. Guttmacher
- Rance Howard as Dr. Brown
- Avery Schreiber as Dean Bill Whittier
- April Shawhan as Erma Whittier
- Tom Nowicki as Bob Chambers
- Elisabeth Redford as Blanche Cafferty
