= The Killing Kind (1973 film) =

1973 film by Curtis Harrington

- Theatrical poster
- Directed by: Curtis Harrington
- Written by: Tony Crechales; George Edwards
- Produced by: George Edwards; Sal Grasso; Leon Mirell
- Starring: Ann Sothern; John Savage; Ruth Roman; Luana Anders; Cindy Williams; Susan Bernard
- Cinematography: Mario Tosi
- Music by: Andrew Belling
- Distributed by: Media Trend Productions
- Release dates: May 24, 1973 (Cannes); July 13, 1973 (Austin, Texas)
- Running time: 95 minutes (Note: The American Film Institute lists the film as running approximately 95 minutes, though an extended cut of 105 minutes is also noted.)
- Country: United States
- Language: English

The Killing Kind is a 1973 American psychological horror film directed by Curtis Harrington, and starring Ann Sothern, John Savage, Ruth Roman, Luana Anders, and Cindy Williams. It follows a young man who, after being released from prison for a sexual assault he did not commit, submits to his impulsive urge to seek revenge against those who wronged him. The film is based on a screenplay by Tony Crechales, whose screenplay was revised by producer George Edwards, an associate producer on Harrington's previous film, What's the Matter with Helen? (1971).

The film features music by Andrew Belling and cinematography by Italian cameraman Mario Tosi.

== Plot ==
Terry Lambert serves two years in prison after being physically forced to participate in a gang rape when the victim, Tina Moore, lies about the nature of the incident. Terry's eccentric mother, Thelma, runs a large Victorian boarding house in suburban Los Angeles, primarily for elderly ladies. Terry and Thelma have a relationship of unusual intimacy. Thelma, an amateur photographer, obsessively photographs Terry, and frames the numerous portraits in the house.

When Terry returns home after the prison stay, he moves back into the boarding house. The day after his arrival, a young woman, Lori Davis, arrives from Arizona and rents a room. Shortly after, Thelma finds one of her beloved pet cats dead. One day at the poolside, Terry pulls Lori into the water after she playfully pushes him in, and becomes aggressive, holding her head underwater. The altercation is witnessed by Thelma, who blames Lori for "leading Terry on," and Louise, a shy librarian who lives next-door.

Later, Terry borrows his mother's car to stalk Tina, chasing her and nearly forcing her off the road. Meanwhile, Louise takes an interest in Terry, and sparks a conversation with him by the pool one night, and makes a sexual advance at him. Louise later claims to Terry that she was not actually trying to seduce him. Terry subsequently visits the home of Rhea Benson, the attorney who failed to get him a reduced sentence. In a deranged state, Terry forces her at knifepoint to ingest a significant amount of alcohol. When she falls unconscious, Terry lights her house on fire, burning her alive.

At the boarding house, Terry gets into another altercation with Lori while attempting to fix her leaking shower head, and strangles her to death in the bathtub. Thelma finds Lori's corpse in the bathroom, and helps to dispose of the body to protect Terry. The two stuff Lori's corpse in a trash can and haul it to a local dump in the middle of the night. However, Louise observes the two moving the trash can and becomes suspicious, calling the police. Thelma puts potassium cyanide into chocolate milk she makes for Terry. Terry, not knowing it is poisoned, drinks, and dies on the sofa as Thelma cradles him in her lap. She takes one final photo of him, and she hears sirens approaching in the distance.

== Cast ==
- Ann Sothern as Thelma Lambert
- John Savage as Terry Lambert
- Ruth Roman as Rhea Benson
- Luana Anders as Louise
- Cindy Williams as Lori Davis
- Susan Bernard as Tina Moore (billed as Sue Bernard)
- Marjorie Eaton as Mrs. Orland
- Peter Brocco as Louise's Father

== Production ==
The Killing Kind was filmed in the Larchmont section of Los Angeles in 1972.

== Release ==
The film was handled by the distributor Media Trend Productions. In an interview, Harrington remarked, "They knew about as much about distribution as my grandmother". The film was released on the states' rights circuit and because it was not known where the film had played, it prohibited the film from getting a wide release. After a May 1973 screening at the Cannes Film Festival, the film opened regionally in Austin, Texas on July 13, 1973. It subsequently opened in drive-in theaters in Fort Worth, Texas on December 12, 1973.

In 2003, the film was shown in a retrospective on Harrington at Film Forum in New York City.

=== Home media ===
The film went largely unseen until Paragon Video released it on VHS in 1987 (the UK VHS release was retitled The Psychopath). It was later released as the second half of a double bill with James Landis's The Sadist (1963) on a DVD from Diamond Entertainment Corporation in 2003.

Dark Sky Films released the film on Region 1 DVD in 2007. The release features an interview with Harrington made shortly before his death. Vinegar Syndrome released the film on Blu-ray in 2018.

== See also ==
- List of American films of 1973
