= Geoffrey Horne =

American actor (born 1933)

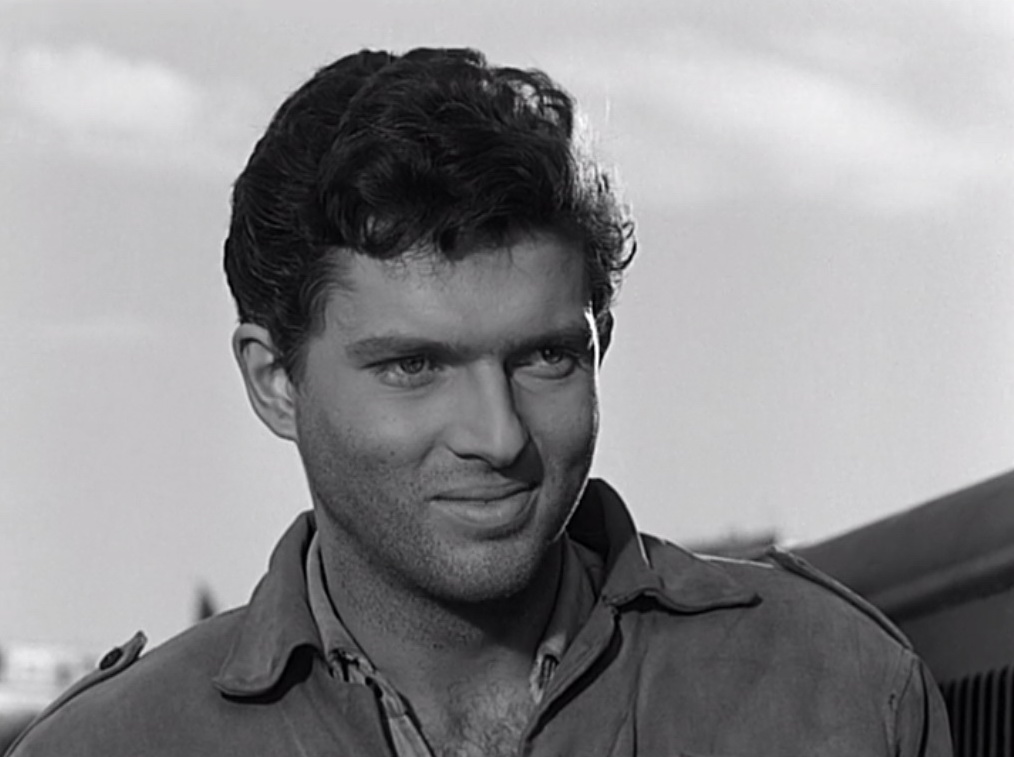
- Horne in Esterina (1959)
- Born: August 22, 1933 (age 92); Buenos Aires, Argentina
- Occupations: Actor, acting coach
- Years active: 1955–present
- Spouse(s): Nancy Berg (m. 1958; div. 1962) Collin Wilcox (m. 1963; div. 1977) Robin Horne (m. 1980–1986)
- Children: 9

Geoffrey Horne (born August 22, 1933) is an American actor, director, and acting coach at the Lee Strasberg Theatre and Film Institute. His film and television credits include The Bridge on the River Kwai, Bonjour Tristesse, The Strange One, Two People, The Twilight Zone (episode "The Gift", 1962), and The Outer Limits (as Wade Norton in "The Guests" episode, 1963).

== Early life ==
Horne was born in Buenos Aires, Argentina on August 22, 1933, to American parents (his father was a businessman in the oil trade). When he was five, he went to live with his mother in Havana, Cuba. Ten years later, he was sent to "a little school in New England for troubled children," in his words. He graduated from private boarding school, Millbrook School, before attending the University of California, where he decided to be an actor.

== Career ==
Horne moved to New York where he appeared in an off-Broadway flop, then began to get regular work on television, including an adaptation of Billy Budd. He also joined the Actors Studio.

In July 1956, he successfully auditioned for a small role in The Strange One (1957), whose cast was composed entirely of Actors Studio alumni. The film was not a huge hit but was widely acclaimed; it marked the film debut of Ben Gazzara and George Peppard. The film was produced by Sam Spiegel, who then cast Horne in a role in The Bridge on the River Kwai in January 1957.

Spiegel signed Horne to a long-term contract – one film per year for five years. "I know Sam wouldn't send me down the river," said Horne. "He's a man of great taste and talent. And the best of the independents to be linked up with, what with all the old-time studio executive types on the way out...I'm not sure I have what it takes to be a star...Time will tell."

Otto Preminger borrowed him for a role in Bonjour Tristesse but he made no further films with Spiegel. He then made Tempest in Yugoslavia.

A life member of the Actors Studio, Horne was almost cast as Bud Stamper in Splendor in the Grass by director Elia Kazan, but the role eventually went to Warren Beatty.

In 1980, he appeared in a New York production of Richard III. In 1981, he joined the cast of Merrily We Roll Along, and became the oldest cast member. He appeared as Dr. Bird in The Caine Mutiny Court Martial produced by the Stamford Center for the Arts in 1983.

== Selected filmography ==
- Robert Montgomery Presents - "The Breaking Point" (1955)
- Ponds Theater - "Billy Budd" (1955)
- Studio One in Hollywood - "Like Father, Like Son" (1955)
- The Alcoa Hour - "Flight into Danger" (1956)
- Robert Montgomery Presents - "The Young and the Beautiful" (1956)
- The Strange One (1957) - Jack Garfein
- The Bridge on the River Kwai (1957) - Lieutenant Joyce
- Bonjour Tristesse (1958) - Philippe
- Tempest (1958) - Piotr Grinov
- Camera Three - "An Air That Kills" (1959)
- Esterina (1959) - Gino
- Cradle Song (1960)
- Adventures in Paradise - "Whip-Fight!" (1960)
- Moment of Fear - "The Accomplice" (1960)
- The Story of Joseph and His Brethren (1961) - Joseph
- The Corsican Brothers (1961) - Paolo Franchi / Leone Franchi
- The Twilight Zone - "The Gift" (1962)
- Implacable Three (1963) - Don César Guzmán
- Route 66 - "Is It True There Are Poxies at the Bottom of Landfair Lake?" (1964)
- The Great Adventure - "Rodger Young" (1964)
- The Outer Limits - "The Guests" (1964)
- The Alfred Hitchcock Hour - "Completely Foolproof" (1965)
- The Doctors and the Nurses - "An Unweeded Garden" (1965)
- The F.B.I. - "The Baby Sitter" (1966)
- The Virginian - "Harvest of Strangers" (1966)
- The Green Hornet - "Beautiful Dreamer" (1966)
- Run for Your Life - "Trip to the Far Side" (1967)
- The Baby Maker (1970) - Jimmy (uncredited) - also dialogue coach
- Circle of Fear - "Alter-Ego" (1972)
- Cannon - "Press Pass to the Slammer" (1973)
- Two People (1973) - Ron Kesselman
- Gunsmoke - "A Game of Death... An Act of Love" (1973)
- It's a Bird... It's a Plane... It's Superman! (1975)
- Mannix - "Quartet for Blunt Instrument" (1975)
- Police Woman - "The Hit" (1975)
- The Doctors (1982) - various episodes
- Another World (1983) - various episodes
- Private Sessions (1985)
- Big Daddy (1999) - Sid

=== Theatre ===
- Too Late the Phalarope (1956)
- Jeannette (1960)
- Strange Interlude (1963)
- Richard III (1980)
- Merrily We Roll Along (1981)
- The Caine Mutiny Court-Martial (1983)
