= Point of Betrayal =

- Directed by: Richard Martini
- Written by: Richard Martini
- Starring: Rebecca Broussard; Dina Merrill; Rod Taylor; Rick Johnson
- Release date: 1995
- Country: United States
- Language: English

Point of Betrayal is a 1995 American thriller film about a man (Rick Johnson) trying to drive his mother (Dina Merrill) insane in order to get her money. The film was directed by Richard Martini and produced by Jonathan D. Krane.

== Premise ==
A man tries to drive his mother insane in order to get her money. He hires a nurse for his mother but faces opposition from his stepfather.

== Cast ==
- Dina Merrill as Mother
- Rick Johnson as Son
- Rod Taylor as Stepfather (a.k.a. Ted Kittridge)
- Rebecca Broussard as Nurse (a.k.a. Monet Fletcher)
- Ann Cusack

== Production ==
At the request of the director, Rod Taylor assisted writing some scenes and helped choreograph a fight between himself and Johnson.
