= Sally Kellerman =

American actress (1937–2022)

- Kellerman in a publicity photo for The Third Day (1965)
- Born: Sally Clare Kellerman; June 2, 1937; Long Beach, California, U.S.
- Died: February 24, 2022 (aged 84); Los Angeles, California, U.S.
- Occupation: Actress
- Years active: 1957–2017
- Known for: M*A*S*H; Star Trek: "Where No Man Has Gone Before"; Back to School; Brewster McCloud
- Spouses: Rick Edelstein (m. 1970; div. 1972); Jonathan D. Krane (m. 1980; died 2016)
- Children: 3

Sally Clare Kellerman (June 2, 1937 – February 24, 2022) was an American actress whose acting career spanned 60 years. Her role as Major Margaret "Hot Lips" Houlihan in Robert Altman's film M*A*S*H (1970) earned her an Academy Award nomination for Best Supporting Actress. After M*A*S*H, she appeared in a number of the director's projects, namely the films Brewster McCloud (1970), Welcome to L.A. (1976) (produced by Altman, directed by his protégé, Alan Rudolph), The Player (1992), and Prêt-à-Porter (1994), and the short-lived anthology series Gun (1997). In addition to her work with Altman, Kellerman appeared in films such as The Boston Strangler (1968), Last of the Red Hot Lovers (1972), Slither (1973), Lost Horizon (1973), Rafferty and the Gold Dust Twins (1975), A Little Romance (1979), Foxes (1980), Sesame Street Presents: Follow That Bird (1985), and Back to School (1986). Throughout her career she guest starred in many television series, notably the Star Trek (1966) episode "Where No Man Has Gone Before" and her Daytime Emmy Award-nominated role in The Young and the Restless (2014–2015).

At age 18, Kellerman signed a recording contract with Verve Records, but her first album (Roll with the Feelin' on the Decca label) was not recorded until 1972. A second album Sally was released in 2009. Kellerman did commercial voiceover work for Hidden Valley Ranch salad dressing, Mercedes-Benz, and Revlon.

In 2013, she released her memoir Read My Lips: Stories of a Hollywood Life, describing her trials and tribulations in the entertainment business.

== Early life ==
Kellerman was born in Long Beach, California, on June 2, 1937 to Edith Baine (née Vaughn), a piano teacher from Portland, Arkansas, and John Helm "Jack" Kellerman, a Shell Oil executive from St. Louis. She had an older sister; her younger sister died in infancy. Edith was a Christian Scientist and raised her daughters in this faith.

When Kellerman was in fifth grade, the family moved from Long Beach to the San Fernando Valley. She spent her early life in then-rural Granada Hills in a largely unpopulated area surrounded by orange and eucalyptus groves. During her sophomore year of high school, the Kellermans moved from San Fernando to Park La Brea, Los Angeles, where she attended Hollywood High School. She grew to stand 5 ft 10 1/2 in (179.1 cm). Due to her shyness, she made few friends and received poor grades (except in choir and physical education) but appeared in a school production of Meet Me in St. Louis.

With the help of a high-school friend, Kellerman submitted a recording demo to Verve Records founder and head Norman Granz. After signing a contract with Verve, however, she was daunted by the task of becoming a recording artist and walked away.

Kellerman attended Los Angeles City College for a year, and enrolled in Jeff Corey's acting class. Within a year, she appeared in a production of John Osborne's Look Back in Anger staged by Corey and featuring classmates Shirley Knight, Jack Nicholson, Dean Stockwell, and Robert Blake. Towards the end of the 1950s, Kellerman joined the newly opened Actors Studio West and debuted before the camera in the film, Reform School Girl (1957). To pay Corey's instruction fees, among other employment, Kellerman worked as a waitress at the Chez Paulette coffee house that film stars frequented.

== Career ==
=== 1960s ===
Kellerman made a number of television-series appearances. She was in an episode of the western Cheyenne, as well as a role as a waitress in the John Forsythe sitcom Bachelor Father. Struggling for parts in television and films, Kellerman acted on stage. She debuted in Henrik Ibsen's An Enemy of the People, followed by parts in a Pasadena Playhouse production of Leslie Stevens's The Marriage-Go-Round and Michael Shurtleff's Call Me by My Rightful Name (1962).

Kellerman appeared in two episodes of The Outer Limits, first in 1963 in the episode "The Human Factor", and then in 1964 in the episode "The Bellero Shield" in which she played Judith Bellero, the manipulative and ruthless wife of Richard Bellero (played by Martin Landau). In between her two Outer Limits appearances, she was a guest in an episode of My Three Sons. A role as Holly Mitchell, perverted mistress of George Peppard's character in The Third Day (1965), followed. She played leading lady to David Niven in his television series The Rogues in 1965 for an episode titled "God Bless You, G. Carter Huntington" which revolved around her striking beauty to a large degree, and appeared in a 1965 Alfred Hitchcock Hour episode titled "Thou Still Unravished Bride".

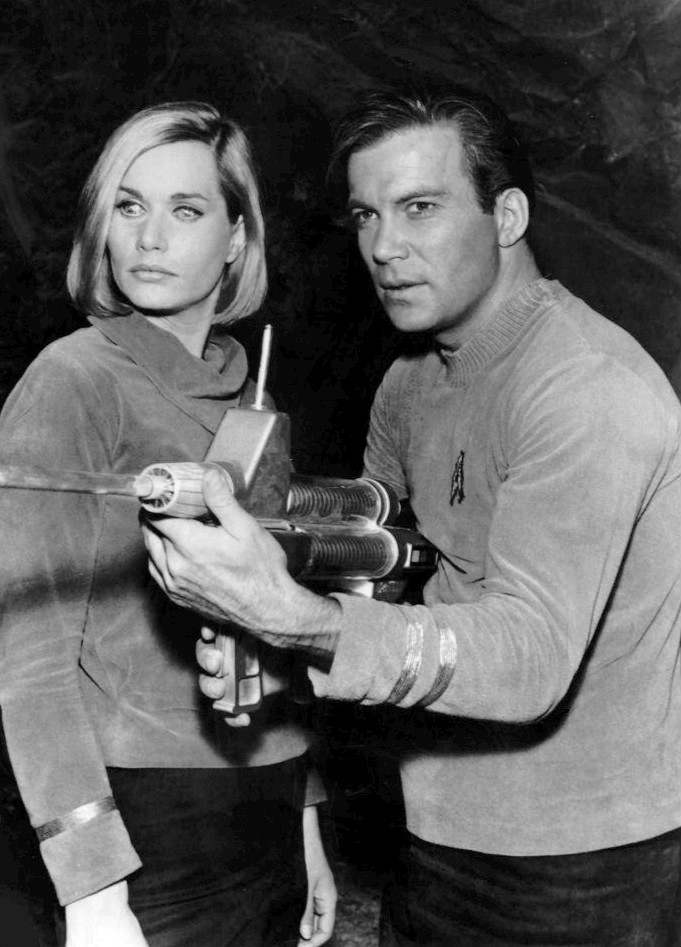
Kellerman as Dr. Dehner and William Shatner as Kirk in the Star Trek episode "Where No Man Has Gone Before" (1966).

A year later, in 1966, Kellerman played psychiatrist "Dr. Elizabeth Dehner" (who studied the long-term effects of space on a crew) in "Where No Man Has Gone Before" (S01 E03 P02), the second pilot for Star Trek, which would ultimately be broadcast as the third episode of the first season. Three months after that, Kellerman played Mag Wildwood in the original Broadway production of Breakfast at Tiffany's, directed by Joseph Anthony and produced by David Merrick, which closed after four preview performances. Before the closing the musical numbers were recorded live, and she recorded three songs which appeared on the original cast recording.

Near the end of the decade, Kellerman guest-starred in The Invaders in the episode "Labyrinth" (1968). She also had turns as the severely beaten (and only surviving) victim of Albert DeSalvo in The Boston Strangler (1968), and Phyllis Brubaker (Jack Lemmon's materialistic wife) in the romantic comedy The April Fools (1969). She turned down a role in Paul Mazursky's Bob & Carol & Ted & Alice (1969). She played Eleanor in the Hawaii Five-O episode "The Big Kahuna" (1969).

In a 1971 Life magazine interview, Kellerman remembered her television years: "It took me eight years to get into TV — and six years to get out. Frigid women, alcoholics they gave me. I got beat up, raped, and never played comedy."

=== 1970s ===
Kellerman received her breakthrough role (Major Margaret "Hot Lips" O’Houlihan in Robert Altman's M*A*S*H) in 1970. Her performance received Academy Award and Golden Globe nominations, winning the Kansas City Film Critics Circle (KCFCC) Award for Best Supporting Actress, the Golden Laurel for Best Comedy Performance (Female), and a second-place National Society of Film Critics (NSFC) Award for Best Supporting Actress. Kellerman was featured in Life magazine. She again collaborated with Altman in Brewster McCloud as Louise, guardian angel to Bud Cort, and recorded "Rock-a-Bye Baby" for the film's soundtrack.

Her next role was as a hostile, chain-smoking, sex-addicted woman who was trying to have an afternoon affair with Alan Arkin's character in Gene Saks' film adaptation of Neil Simon's comedy Last of the Red Hot Lovers (1972). In Manhattan after the film, Kellerman declined an offer for a ten-page spread in Vogue from the then editor-in-chief Grace Mirabella. When she refused the part of Linda Rogo in The Poseidon Adventure (1972), Stella Stevens got the role. Shortly afterwards, she recorded her first demo with Lou Adler, and Roll with the Feelin for Decca Records with producer-arranger Gene Page. After filming Last of the Red Hot Lovers, Kellerman passed up a role in another Altman film:

I had just finished filming Last of the Red Hot Lovers when Bob called me one day at home. "Sally, do you want to be in my picture after next?" he asked. "Only if it's a good part," I said. He hung up on me. Bob was as stubborn and arrogant as I was at the time, but the sad thing is that I cheated myself out of working with someone I loved so much, someone who made acting both fun and easy and who trusted his actors. Stars would line up to work for nothing for Bob Altman. Oh, the Altman film I turned down? Nashville. In that part, I would have been able to sing. Bad choice.

Kellerman's next roles included a woman involved in a deadly plot in the slasher film A Reflection of Fear (1972); an eccentric woman in the road movie Slither opposite James Caan (1973), and a tormented journalist in Charles Jarrott's musical remake of Frank Capra's Lost Horizon (also contributing to the latter's soundtrack). Two years later, she played Mackinley Beachwood in Dick Richards' Rafferty and the Gold Dust Twins (1975), one of two women who kidnap driving instructor—and former United States Marine Corps gunnery sergeant—Rafferty (Alan Arkin), also singing "Honky Tonk Angels".

In October 1975, Kellerman sang at the legendary Greenwich Village cabaret Reno Sweeney, and performed two shows nightly at the Rainbow Grill from November 25 to December 14. Her next appearance was as Sybil Crane (a woman in the midst of a divorce) in The Big Bus, a parody of disaster films, followed by a role as a lonely real estate agent in the Alan Rudolph-directed and Altman-produced Welcome to L.A. (both 1976). The next year, Kellerman appeared in a week-long run of cabaret concerts beginning at the Grand Finale club on May 2. Songs that evening included versions of Leon Russell and Betty Everett hits.

At the end of the decade, Kellerman's roles included Maureen, a veteran vaudevillian, in Verna: USO Girl (1978); Veronica Sterling, a party-addicted socialite, in the made-for-television film She'll Be Sweet (1978); and Lise Bockweiss—one of several wives of Pasquinel (Robert Conrad) and daughter of Herman Bockweiss (Raymond Burr)—in the 12-episode miniseries Centennial (1978–1979). Kellerman played Kay King, the pretentious and kooky mother of a lovelorn daughter (Diane Lane), in George Roy Hill's A Little Romance (1979).

=== 1980s ===
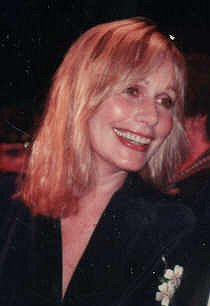
Kellerman at the 1979 premiere of The Rose

Kellerman began the decade as Mary, a divorced middle-aged suburban mother struggling to raise her rebellious daughter (Jodie Foster) in Adrian Lyne's Foxes (1980); Martha, a six-times-married eccentric, in Bill Persky's Serial, and the silly-but-sophisticated Mrs. Liggett in Jack Smight's Loving Couples. Her later roles included Mary, a child psychiatrist in a sadomasochistic relationship with a psychology professor (Stephen Lackman) after they meet by accident (literally) in Michael Grant's Head On, and a 1920s socialite in Kirk Browning's made-for-television film adaptation of Dorothy Parker's 1929 short story Big Blonde (both 1980). From October 3 to November 15, 1980, Kellerman starred as Julia Seton in an Ahmanson Theatre production of Philip Barry's Holiday (directed by Robert Allan Ackerman) with Kevin Kline, Maurice Evans, and Marisa Berenson.

On February 7, 1981, Kellerman hosted Saturday Night Live, appearing in four sketches ("Monologue", "The Audition", "Was I Ever Red", and "Lean Acres") and closing the show with Donna Summer's "Starting Over Again". Kellerman's next performances were in made-for-television films. She played the title character's first wife, Maxine Cates, in Dempsey and a honky-tonk dance-hall proprietress in September Gun. That year she also appeared in a stage production, Tom Eyen's R-rated spoof of 1940s women's prison films Women Behind Bars. Kellerman played Gloria, a tough inmate who controls the other prisoners.

Her next roles were a KGB-training-school warden in the made-for-television film, Secret Weapons (1985); the sadomasochistic Judge Nedra Henderson in Moving Violations (1985); Rodney Dangerfield's love interest in Alan Metter's comedy Back to School (1986); Julie Andrews' and Jack Lemmon's eccentric neighbor in Blake Edwards' That's Life (1986); a porn star trying to get into heaven in Meatballs III: Summer Job (1986); Kerri Green's mother in Three for the Road (1987), and an actress in Henry Jaglom's Someone to Love. Late in the decade, Kellerman planned to release her second album, which would have included "It's Good to Be Bad, It's Bad to Be Good" from 1992's Boris and Natasha: The Movie (which she produced and starred in as Natasha Fatale); however, the album never was released.

=== 1990s ===
In 1992, there was a fourth collaboration between Kellerman and Altman in The Player, in which she appeared as herself. Supporting roles followed in Percy Adlon's Younger and Younger (1993), Murder She Wrote (1993) and Mirror, Mirror II: Raven Dance (1994), the sequel of the Yvonne De Carlo and Karen Black horror film Mirror, Mirror. The actress appeared in another Altman film, Prêt-à-Porter (1994), as Sissy Wanamaker, editor-in-chief of Harper's Bazaar, with Tracey Ullman and Linda Hunt. During filming, Altman flew Kellerman and co-star Lauren Bacall from Paris for his tribute at Lincoln Center. From April 18 to May 21, 1995, Kellerman played the title role in the Maltz Jupiter Theatre production of Mame. Around this time, Kellerman appeared in back-to-back plays in Boston and Edmonton. In Boston, she played Martha in the Hasty Pudding Theatricals production of Who's Afraid of Virginia Woolf?, and starred as Mary Jane Dankworth in a two-month, two-character production of Lay of the Land with Michael Hogan in Edmonton. That year Kellerman planned to release her second album, Something Kool, featuring songs from the 1950s.

In 1996, Kellerman played a calculating sister in an episode of The Naked Truth, "Sister in Sex Triangle with Gazillionaire!" A year later, she collaborated with Altman for the last time in "All the President's Women", an episode of the director's TV series Gun. The actress then co-produced and reprised her Canadian stage role in a film version of The Lay of the Land.

In 1997, Kellerman was scheduled to play the title role in Mrs. Scrooge: A Slightly Different Christmas Carol, a made-for-TV film version of Charles Dickens' novella. In the film, Mrs. Scrooge is a homophobic widow whose late partner (Jacob Marley) and three other spirits awaken her to the reality of AIDS. Although it was never released, the actress told a reporter for The Advocate why the project was more personal than professional: "My sister’s gay—and was gay before it was popular... My sister is a very loving person. So is her girlfriend. And my daughter is an amazing woman. They’re all heroic in my book."

Kellerman appeared in the 1998 Columbo episode "Ashes to Ashes". On June 10, 1999, Kellerman joined actresses Kathleen Turner and Beverly Peele in a Planned Parenthood press conference supporting a proposed law introduced to the U.S. Congress.

=== 2000s ===
At the beginning of the century, Kellerman appeared in Canon Theatre's production of Eve Ensler's The Vagina Monologues with Teri Hatcher and Regina Taylor. This was followed by a cabaret show at Feinstein's at the Regency, which opened with Helen Reddy's "I Am Woman". Other songs ranged from Barbra Streisand's "The Way We Were" to "We Shall Overcome" and "America the Beautiful". In March 2002, Kellerman performed in Los Angeles' What a Pair, a benefit for breast cancer research, joining singer-songwriter Julia Fordham for "Why Can't I". That year, the actress also played protagonist Judge Marcia Blackwell in the made-for-television film Verdict in Blood. This was followed by another cabaret show, produced by Hal David, at the Palmdale Playhouse. Songs included Etta James' "Sunday Kind of Love" and "Long Way From St. Louis". An album (Body Parts) was planned, but never released.

In the summer of 2004, Kellerman played host Madame ZinZanni in Teatro ZinZanni. That year she also received the Susan B. Anthony "Failure is Impossible" Award, honoring women in the film industry who have overcome adversity, at the High Falls Film Festival. Kellerman returned to the stage for a second What a Pair concert, joining actress Lauren Frost for "I'm Past My Prime". The next year, she played Dolores Montoya in Blank Theatre Company's Los Angeles revival of The Wild Party, followed by the sexually-provocative Sandy in Susan Seidelman's Boynton Beach Club. Kellerman sang Cole Porter's "My Heart Belongs to Daddy" with actress, singer and songwriter Kathleen "Bird" York at her third (and final) What a Pair concert. In 2006 the actress appeared as herself in the first episode of the IFC's The Minor Accomplishments of Jackie Woodman, "A Cult Classic".

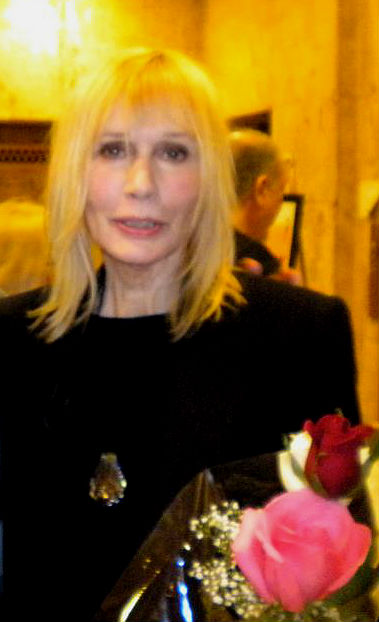
Kellerman at Robert Altman: Celebration of an American Icon in January 2010

In September 2008, Kellerman recorded a duet with Ray Brown Jr. (son of Ella Fitzgerald and Ray Brown), "I Thought About You", for Brown's duet CD Friends and Family. In 2009, Kellerman released a jazz and blues album, Sally, her first since Roll with the Feelin'. Sally featured interpretations of songs by Linda Ronstadt, Kim Carnes, Aerosmith, Nina Simone, the Motels, Neil Diamond, Jackson Browne, Marvin Gaye, Dolly Parton, Jennifer Warnes, and James Taylor. That year she also played Donette, owner of a small-town diner, in the made-for-television film The Wishing Well.

=== 2010s ===
Kellerman starred with Ernest Borgnine and Mickey Rooney in Night Club (2011). Her performance as a woman with Alzheimer's living in a retirement home won an Accolade Competition Award for Best Supporting Actress. That year she played a recurring role as Lola (an eccentric artist) in Cinemax's sexually explicit comedy-drama series Chemistry, followed by guest appearances on the CW teen drama series 90210 as Marla, an aging Hollywood actress with dementia who considers assisted suicide. On July 7, 2012, Kellerman appeared with Tito Ortiz, Cary Elwes, and Drake Bell in an episode of the Biography Channel's Celebrity Ghost Stories.

On April 30, 2013, the actress released her memoir, Read My Lips: Stories of a Hollywood Life, published by Weinstein Books. In the book, she remembered a close-knit, family-oriented past Hollywood and her triumphs and tribulations as an actress during the 1960s. Kellerman made promotional book-signing appearances in Los Angeles, Santa Monica, Manhattan, and Jersey City. Shortly afterward, she appeared as Marc Maron's bohemian mother in the "Dead Possum" episode of his comedy series.

Kellerman later received a Fort Lauderdale International Film Festival (FLIFF) Lifetime Achievement Award at Cinema Paradiso in Fort Lauderdale, Florida. The ceremony, which included a montage of her work and an audience question-and-answer session, was moderated by film historian Foster Hirsch. In September 2013 filmmaker Ellen Houlihan released a short film Joan's Day Out, in which Kellerman played a grandmother who escapes from her assisted-living facility to bail her teenage granddaughter out of prison. The actress joined the Love Can Initiative, a nonprofit organization dedicated to enriching the lives of low income families and their children, in February 2014. Kellerman made a return appearance in the second season of Maron in the episode "Mom Situation", and as part of an Epix Network documentary celebrating the life of Robert Altman on August 6, 2014.

In October 2014, TVLine announced that Kellerman had been cast in the mysterious role of Constance Bingham on the daytime soap opera The Young and the Restless and was nominated for a Daytime Emmy as Best Actress in a Guest Role. In 2016, she continued her recurring role on Maron and played in five episodes of the new series Decker.

== Personal life ==
In 1961, Kellerman underwent a botched home abortion, and went to a hospital for the first time (due to her Christian Science upbringing). The relationship that had caused her terminated pregnancy was with bit actor William Duffy.

In the late 1960s, she was briefly involved with actor-screenwriter Lawrence Hauben. Hauben shot a documentary, Venus, about their relationship, which received a very limited theatrical release in 1971.

After the release of MASH, on December 17, 1970, Kellerman married future Starsky & Hutch producer Rick Edelstein. Anjanette Comer, Joanne Linville, and Luana Anders were among her bridesmaids. On March 6, 1972, Kellerman divorced Edelstein, citing irreconcilable differences. "We've fought every day since we've met," she said at the time.

In 1967, Kellerman's sister came out as a lesbian and separated from her husband, Ian Charles Cargill Graham, who took full custody of the couple's daughter. After she moved to France with her partner, she did not communicate with her daughter for eight years. Sally adopted her sister's daughter, and three months later, Ian Graham died in Edinburgh, Scotland.

For a time in the mid-1970s, Kellerman was involved with Mark Farner of the rock group Grand Funk Railroad. He wrote the song "Sally", from the 1976 album Born to Die, as an ode to their relationship. She also dated screenwriters David Rayfiel and Charles Shyer, as well as journalist Warren Hoge, producer Jon Peters, and actor Edd Byrnes. In her autobiography, Kellerman made a point to note that her romance with Byrnes was never consummated.

On May 11, 1980, Kellerman married producer Jonathan D. Krane in a private ceremony at Jennifer Jones's Malibu home. The couple adopted newborn twins. The family relocated to Jupiter, Florida in 1991. After encountering financial difficulties, they sold their condo there in 2008 and moved back to Hollywood.

Jonathan Krane died of a heart attack on August 1, 2016, aged 64. Their adopted daughter died less than four months later.

Kellerman and Krane separated twice during their 36-year marriage, first for a few months in 1994, then again during 1997–98 over Krane's public affair with Nastassja Kinski. As Kellerman had dated married men in the past, she forgave her husband for the affair.

=== Death ===
Kellerman died from heart failure at a care facility in Woodland Hills, Los Angeles, on February 24, 2022, at the age of 84. At the time of her death, she had dementia.

== Filmography ==
=== Film ===
Year	Title	Role	Notes
1957	Reform School Girl	Marcia	
1962	Hands of a Stranger	Sue	
1965	The Third Day	Holly Mitchell	
1968	The Boston Strangler	Dianne Cluny	
1969	The April Fools	Phyllis Brubaker	
1970	M*A*S*H	Major Margaret 'Hot Lips' Houlihan	
1970	Brewster McCloud	Louise	
1971	Venus	Herself	Documentary
1972	Last of the Red Hot Lovers	Elaine Navazio	
1972	A Reflection of Fear	Anne	
1973	Slither	Kitty Kopetzky	
1973	Lost Horizon	Sally Hughes	
1975	Rafferty and the Gold Dust Twins	Mackinley Beachwood	
1976	The Big Bus	Sybil Crane	
1976	Welcome to L.A.	Ann Goode	
1977	The Mouse and His Child	The Seal	Voice
1979	A Little Romance	Kay King	
1980	Foxes	Mary	
1980	It Rained All Night the Day I Left	The Colonel	
1980	Serial	Martha	
1980	Head On	Michelle Keys	
1985	Sesame Street Presents: Follow That Bird	Miss Finch	Voice
1985	Moving Violations	Judge Nedra Henderson	
1985	KGB: The Secret War	Fran Simpson	
1986	Back to School	Dr. Diane Turner	
1986	That's Life!	Holly Parrish	
1986	Meatballs III: Summer Job	Roxy Dujour	
1987	Three for the Road	Blanche	
1987	Someone to Love	Edith Helm	
1988	You Can't Hurry Love	Kelly Bones	
1989	The Secret of the Ice Cave	Dr. Valerie Ostrow	
1989	All's Fair	Florence	
1989	Happily Ever After	Sunburn	Voice
1993	Doppelganger	Sister Jan	
1993	Younger and Younger	'Zig-Zag' Lilian	
1994	Mirror, Mirror 2: Raven Dance	Roslyn	
1994	Prêt-à-Porter	Sissy Wanamaker	
1996	It's My Party	Sara Hart	
1997	The Lay of the Land	Mary Jane Dankworth	
1999	American Virgin	Quaint	
2001	Women Of The Night	Mary	
2004	Open House	Marjorie Milford	
2005	Boynton Beach Club	Sandy	
2006	Payback	Miss Bronson	Voice; director's cut
2007	Ratatouille	Mabel	Voice; uncredited
2008	Delgo	Narrator	Voice
2011	Night Club	Dorothy	
2013	Joan's Day Out	Joan	Short film
2014	Reach Me	Florence 'Flo'	
2014	When Bette Met Mae	Narrator	Documentary
2014	A Place for Heroes	Maureen	
2016	His Neighbor Phil	Bernadette	
2016	The Remake	Aunt Peg	
2016	Flycatcher	Thelma	

=== Television ===
Year(s)	Title	Role(s)	Notes
1962	Cheyenne	Lottie Durango	Episode: "The Durango Brothers"
1963–1964	The Outer Limits	Ingrid Larkin	Episode: "The Human Factor"
1963–1964	The Outer Limits	Judith Bellero	Episode: "The Bellero Shield"
1963	The Twilight Zone	Office Worker	Episode: "Miniature"
1963	The Adventures of Ozzie and Harriet	Miss Winters	Episode: "Redecorating Dave's Office"
1963	My Three Sons	Helga Willamsen	Episode: "Steve and the Viking"
1964–1965	12 O'Clock High	Lieutenant Libby MacAndrews	Episodes: "The Men and the Boys" and "Those Who Are About to Die"
1965	The Rogues	Elsa Huntington	Episode: "God Bless You, G. Carter Huntington"
1965	The Alfred Hitchcock Hour	Sally Benner	Episode: "Thou Still Unravished Bride"
1965	Seaway	Aline Svenson	Episodes: "Bonhomme Richard"
1966	Star Trek	Dr. Elizabeth Dehner	Episode: "Where No Man Has Gone Before"
1966	Bonanza	Kathleen Walker	Episode: "A Dollar's Worth of Trouble"
1966	That Girl	Sandy Stafford	Episode: "Break a Leg"
1967	The Invaders	Laura Crowell	Episode: "Labyrinth"
1969	Mannix	Diana Walker	Episode: "The Solid Gold Web"
1970	Bonanza	Lotta Crabtree	Episode: "Return Engagement"
1978	She'll Be Sweet (aka Magee and the Lady)	Veronica Stirling	Television film
1978–1979	Centennial	Lise Bockweiss Pasquinnel	Miniseries
1980	Big Blonde	Hazel	Television film
1981	Saturday Night Live	Herself (host)	Episode: "Sally Kellerman/Jimmy Cliff"
1982	For Lovers Only	Emmy Pugh	Television film
1983	Dempsey	Maxine Cates	Television film
1983	September Gun	Mama Queen	Television film
1984	Hotel	Lauren Webb	Episode: "Lifelines"
1985	Secret Weapons	Vera Malevich	Television film
1986	Tall Tales & Legends	Lucy	Episode: "Ponce de Leon"
1990	The Ray Bradbury Theater	Clara Goodwater	Episode: "Excorcism"
1990	Evening Shade	Shelley Darling	Episode: "Hooray for Wood"
1991	Victim of Beauty	Evelyn Ash	Television film
1992	Boris and Natasha: The Movie	Natasha Fatale	Television film
1993	Murder She Wrote	Junie Cobb	Episode: “The Petrified Florist”
1994	Dream On	Tracy	Episode: "Blinded by the Cheese"
1994, 1998	Diagnosis: Murder	Irene Stanton / Adele Botsford	Episodes: "Woman Trouble" and "Drill for Death"
1995	Kill Shot	Counsellor	Television film
1997	Gun	Frances	Episode: "All the President's Women"
1998	Columbo	Liz Houston	Episode: "Ashes to Ashes"
1999	Norm	Kim	Episode: "Norm vs. Denby"
1999	Not for Ourselves Alone: The Story of Elizabeth Cady Stanton & Susan B. Anthony	Narrator	TV documentary
2000	Bar Hopping	Cassandra	Teleivison film
2000	Sammy	Cleo (voice)	Episode: "Malibu"
2002	Verdict in Blood	Judge Marcia Blackwell	
2002	Trail of the Cougar	Narrator	Television Documentary
2006–2007	The Minor Accomplishments of Jackie Woodman	Herself	Episodes: "A Cult Classic" "Yoga Brain"
2009	The Wishing Well	Donette	Television film
2011	90210	Marla Templeton	Episodes: "Nerdy Little Secrets" "Women on the Verge"
2011	Chemistry	Lola Marquez	12 episodes
2012	Unsupervised	Principal Stark (voice)	8 episodes
2013	Workaholics	Peggy	Episode: "The Worst Generation"
2013	The High Fructose Adventures of Annoying Orange	Romaine Empress / Marshmallow Queen (voice)	2 episodes
2013	Deadtime Stories	Grandma Grussler	Episode: "Little Magic Shop of Horrors"
2013	High School USA!	Dolores Barren (voice)	3 episodes
2013–2016	Maron	Toni Maron	Recurring role
2014	On Cinema	Herself	Episode: "Second Oscar Special"
2014–2015	The Young and the Restless	Constance Bingham	10 episodes Emmy nomination for Best Actress
2015	Comedy Bang! Bang!	Hera	Episode: "Stephen Merchant Wears a Checkered Shirt and Rolled Up Jeans"
2016–2017	Decker	Janet Davidson	7 episodes
2017	Difficult People	Joan Gentile	Episode: "The Silkwood"

== Awards and nominations ==
Year	Work	Award	Category	Result
1970	M*A*S*H	KCFCC Award	Best Supporting Actress	Won
1971	M*A*S*H	NSFC Award	Best Supporting Actress	Nominated
1971	M*A*S*H	Golden Globe Award	Best Supporting Actress	Nominated
1971	M*A*S*H	Golden Laurel	Best Supporting Actress	Won
1971	M*A*S*H	Academy Award	Best Supporting Actress	Nominated
1980	It Rained All Night the Day I Left	Genie Award	Best Performance by a Foreign Actress	Nominated
2004		The Susan B. Anthony "Failure is Impossible" Award	Honoree (shared with actress Joan Allen and publicist Lois Smith)	Won
2011	Night Club	Accolade Global Film Competition Award of Excellence	Best Supporting Actress	Won
2011	Night Club	Golden Door Film Festival	Best Acting by a Supporting Actor/Actress	Won
2013	—N/a	Fort Lauderdale International Film Festival	Lifetime Achievement Award	Won
2015	The Young and the Restless	Daytime Emmy Award	Outstanding Special Guest Performer in a Drama Series	Nominated

== Discography ==
- Roll with the Feelin' (Decca, 1972)
- Sally (The Music Force, 2009)

== Bibliography ==
- Kellerman, Sally (2013). Read My Lips: Stories of a Hollywood Life. Weinstein Books. ISBN 978-1-60286-167-1.

== Sources ==
- Garfield, David (1980). "Appendix: Life Members of The Actors Studio as of January 1980". A Player's Place: The Story of The Actors Studio. New York: Macmillan. ISBN 0-02-542650-8.
- Kellerman, Sally (2013). Read My Lips: Stories of a Hollywood Life. New York: Weinstein Books. ISBN 978-1-60286-167-1.
- Weaver, Tom (2006). Science Fiction Stars and Horror Heroes: Interviews with Actors, Directors, Producers and Writers of the 1940s Through 1960s. Jefferson, North Carolina: McFarland. ISBN 978-0-786-42857-1.
