= Doppelganger (1993 film) =

- Theatrical release poster
- Directed by: Avi Nesher
- Written by: Avi Nesher
- Produced by: Donald P. Borchers
- Starring: Drew Barrymore; George Newbern
- Cinematography: Sven Kirsten
- Edited by: Tatiana S. Riegel
- Music by: Jan A. P. Kaczmarek
- Distributed by: ITC Entertainment Group
- Release dates: January 1993 (Avoriaz); May 26, 1993 (United States)
- Running time: 104 minutes
- Country: United States
- Language: English
- Budget: $3 million

Doppelganger (also known as Doppelganger: The Evil Within) is a 1993 American supernatural horror thriller film written and directed by Avi Nesher, starring Drew Barrymore and George Newbern. The film premiered at the Avoriaz Fantastic Film Festival in January 1993, where it was nominated for the "Grand Prize" award. It was released on VHS on May 26, 1993 in the United States. This was George Maharis' final film before his death in May 2023.

== Plot ==
Holly Gooding (Drew Barrymore) moves from New York City to Los Angeles after being implicated in a murder. She is followed by what appears to be her evil twin. While in Los Angeles, she finds a room for rent by a writer named Patrick Highsmith (George Newbern).

Patrick comes to realize something is odd about Holly, but begins to fall for her anyway. He learns that Holly's brother, Fred, is in a psychiatric hospital after killing their father. When Patrick finds out that Holly's mother was murdered and she is the prime suspect, he starts doubting her sanity, but has grown attached to her, so he does not involve the police when Fred is attacked and suspicion falls on Holly, deciding to get to the bottom of it himself with the help of his writing partner and ex-girlfriend Elizabeth.

Patrick is attacked by a knife-wielding man who is identical to Holly's supposedly dead father, then trails Holly to her family home. He is ambushed there by Holly's psychiatrist, Dr. Heller, who was the one acting as the doppelgänger, her father, and many other people (via the use of latex masks and costumes) and the source of all of Holly's misfortunes, including the murder of Holly's mother (who was planning to kill Holly for her trust fund) in order to frame Holly for this murder and for additional murders, and plans to marry her so a share of her inheritance will belong to him. Just as Heller is about to kill Patrick, Holly undergoes a bizarre supernatural transformation in which she splits into two partially unformed beings, one of which knocks the other one unconscious and kills Dr. Heller. Just as the creature seems about to kill Patrick, it spares him and remerges with its other half to reform into Holly just before the police and Elizabeth arrive.

Patrick attends Holly's funeral, and after she is laid to rest, he sees her evil doppelgänger, who seductively approaches him before warping into the horrific form that killed Heller. He awakes with a start from the nightmare to reveal that he is actually in the hospital, where he and Holly are recovering. As he falls back asleep, Holly remembers the events she went through before destroying the music box given to her by her abusive father.

== Cast ==
- Drew Barrymore as Holly Gooding
- George Newbern as Patrick Highsmith
- Dennis Christopher as Dr. Heller
- Leslie Hope as Elizabeth
- Sally Kellerman as Sister Jan
- George Maharis as Mike Wallace
- Peter Dobson as Rob
- Carl Bressler as Larry Spaulding
- Dan Shor as Stanley White
- Jaid Barrymore as Mrs. Gooding
- Stanley DeSantis as Richard Wolf
- Thomas Bosack as Holly's Father
- Sarina C. Grant as Detective Pouget
- Scott Lawrence as Male Nurse
- Danny Trejo as Hard Hat
- Luana Anders as Ginger
- Lillian Garrett-Groag as Additional Voices
- Tina Lifford as Additional Voices
- Sara Hickman as Psychiatrist #2
- Sean Whalen as Gas Man

== Production ==
Avi Nesher wrote Doppelganger as a deliberately smaller scale film after production stalled on a large scale science fiction film called Hammerheads he was to write and direct with the project eventually being cancelled. The film was shot in the San Fernando Valley and Los Angeles with filming taking place between March and April 1992.
