= All's Fair (film) =

- Directed by: Rocky Lang
- Written by: Randee Russell; John P. Finnegan; Thomas R. Rondinella; William R. Pace
- Produced by: Jon Gordon
- Starring: George Segal; Sally Kellerman; Lou Ferrigno; Jane Kaczmarek; Jennifer Edwards; John Kapelos; Robert Carradine
- Cinematography: Peter Lyons Collister
- Edited by: Maryann Brandon
- Music by: Bill Meyers
- Release date: 1989
- Running time: 87 minutes
- Language: English

All's Fair (also known as Skirmish and Weekend Warriors) is a 1989 American comedy film directed by Rocky Lang and starring George Segal, Sally Kellerman, Robert Carradine, and Lou Ferrigno.

== Premise ==
A group of business executives play paintball war games over a weekend retreat, which turns into a battle of the sexes when the company's women are excluded from participation.

== Cast ==
- George Segal as Colonel
- Sally Kellerman as Florence
- Robert Carradine as Mark
- Jennifer Edwards as Ann
- Jane Kaczmarek as Linda
- John Kapelos as Eddie
- Lou Ferrigno as Klaus
- Steve Tyler as Norman
- Lindsay Parker as Kate
- Lee Wilkof as Finstermacher
- Mary M. Egan as Miss Bloom

== Reception ==
The film received poor reviews. Leonard Maltin described it as "dreadful", while Time Out London said it was a "dreary, unfunny mess", and Kevin Thomas of the Los Angeles Times called it "wretched business", although Thomas did praise Kellerman for her "style and panache" despite the "dire circumstances" of the film.
