= Board and Care =

1979 film

- Directed by: Ron Ellis
- Written by: Ron Ellis
- Produced by: Amelia Anderson; Paul Cheesman; Ron Ellis; Sarah Pillsbury
- Starring: Richard Goss; Laura Jean Ellis
- Cinematography: Fred Goodich
- Edited by: Ron Ellis
- Distributed by: Sprout, Pyramid
- Release date: 1979
- Running time: 26 Minutes
- Country: United States
- Language: English

Board and Care is a 1979 American short film directed by Ron Ellis and starring Richard Goss and Laura Jean Ellis. It won an Oscar at the 52nd Academy Awards in 1980 for Best Short Film, Live Action.

== Premise ==
Two teenagers with Down syndrome want to have a meaningful relationship, but are soon separated by circumstances and well-intended guardians.

== Cast ==
- Richard Goss as Ricky
- Laura Jean Ellis as Lila
- Luana Anders as Carolyn
- Sunshine Parker as Briggs
- John Frederick Jones as Stanton
