= Cannes Man =

- Directed by: Richard Martini Susan Hillary Shapiro
- Written by: Richard Martini; Deric Haddad; Irwin M. Rappaport; Susan Hito Shapiro
- Produced by: Tom Coleman; Johan Schotte; Holly MacConkey
- Starring: Francesco Quinn; Seymour Cassel; Johnny Depp
- Edited by: Richard Currie
- Music by: Richard Martini
- Release date: 1996
- Running time: 88 minutes
- Countries: United States; France
- Languages: English; French; Norwegian

Cannes Man is a 1996 independent comedy film directed by Richard Martini, and Susan Hillary Shapiro (scenes in Cannes). The film stars Seymour Cassel and Francesco Quinn. The film also features more than 15 famous Hollywood actors (mostly cameo) including Johnny Depp, Jon Cryer, Benicio del Toro, John Malkovich, Dennis Hopper, Kevin Pollak, Jim Jarmusch and Chris Penn. The film was released as Direct-to-DVD in many countries.

== Plot ==
Frank 'Rhino' Rhinoslavsky (Quinn) is a dumb part-time cab driver in New York City who wants to break into film business. He doesn't have anything to offer, and just thinks that he can start at the top, as a writer. Opportunity knocks on Frank's door when he goes to the Cannes Film Festival in Cannes, France to deliver some props to Troma, Inc.

So, he meets Sy Lerner (Seymor Cassel), perhaps a bigger loser in movie business and as each person interviewed in this mockumentary attests, he has made a fool out of a lot of industry executives and cost them plenty of money. Lerner makes a bet with his friend that he can take any shmoe off the street and turn them into the biggest success around. And Frank is his shmoe. 'Rhino' is going to create the same success by letting others do all the work.

Sy Lerner takes on Frank as his pet project. He shows Frank how to dress and behave, tells him how to respond when being interviewed such as never saying too much, and always being ambiguous. Then Sy Lerner comes up with the vehicle for Frank's reputation, by naming him the writer of a new movie. Only the movie doesn't exist and Frank isn't a writer. And, even knowing Lerner's reputation, people buy into the garbage. And now, everyone wants a piece of that action. Lerner and Frank (now given a fitting industry name of "Frank Rhino") have everyone knocking down their door, popular directors, big name producers, and famous actors (including Johnny Depp and Jim Jarmusch). Interviews, press opportunities, everything: Frank is the "Cannes Man," and he didn't have to do much to get it. So, they are at the Cannes Film Festival. "It's where deals get made, producers get laid, and stars get paid. It's where all the movie industry meets to buy and sell all the movies on the planet. And it's where the art of the deal can be filled with more laughs than the deal itself."

== Location ==
The film was shot in Cannes, Alpes-Maritimes, France, and in Beverly Hills.

== Critical reception ==
Cannes Man was generally given mixed reviews by critics. Film review aggregate website Rotten Tomatoes gave the film a "rotten" score of 50% based on 6 reviews. Clint Morris from Moviehole said, "Richard Martini really knows Hollywood - if you're a fan of The Player, you'll love this. You'll see more stars in this than you will outside the window of a space ship!" Peter Nichols of the New York Times deemed it "One of this year's small treasures" when released to video in 1997.

== Main cast ==
- Seymour Cassel as Sy Lerner
- Francesco Quinn as Frank "Rhino" Rhinoslavsky
- Rebecca Broussard as Rebecca Lerner
- Johnny Depp as Himself
- Treat Williams as Himself
- Jim Jarmusch as Himself
- Lara Flynn Boyle as Herself
- Ann Cusack as Kitty Monaco
- Dennis Hopper as Himself (cameo)

== Celebrity cameos ==
- Benicio del Toro as himself
- John Malkovich as himself
- Dennis Hopper as himself
- Marc Duret as French actor
- Robert Evans as Producer
- Chris Penn as himself
- Kevin Pollak as himself
- Jon Cryer as himself
- Lloyd Kaufman as Troma Chief
- Jim Sheridan as himself (uncredited)
- Richard Martini as Director (uncredited)
- Bryan Singer as himself
- Harvey Weinstein as himself
- Peter Gallagher as himself
- Frank Whaley as himself (billed as Frank Whalley)

== Home media ==
The film was released on DVD (PAL, cat. 23904) in Australia by Flashback Entertainment.
