= Kerri Green =

American actress

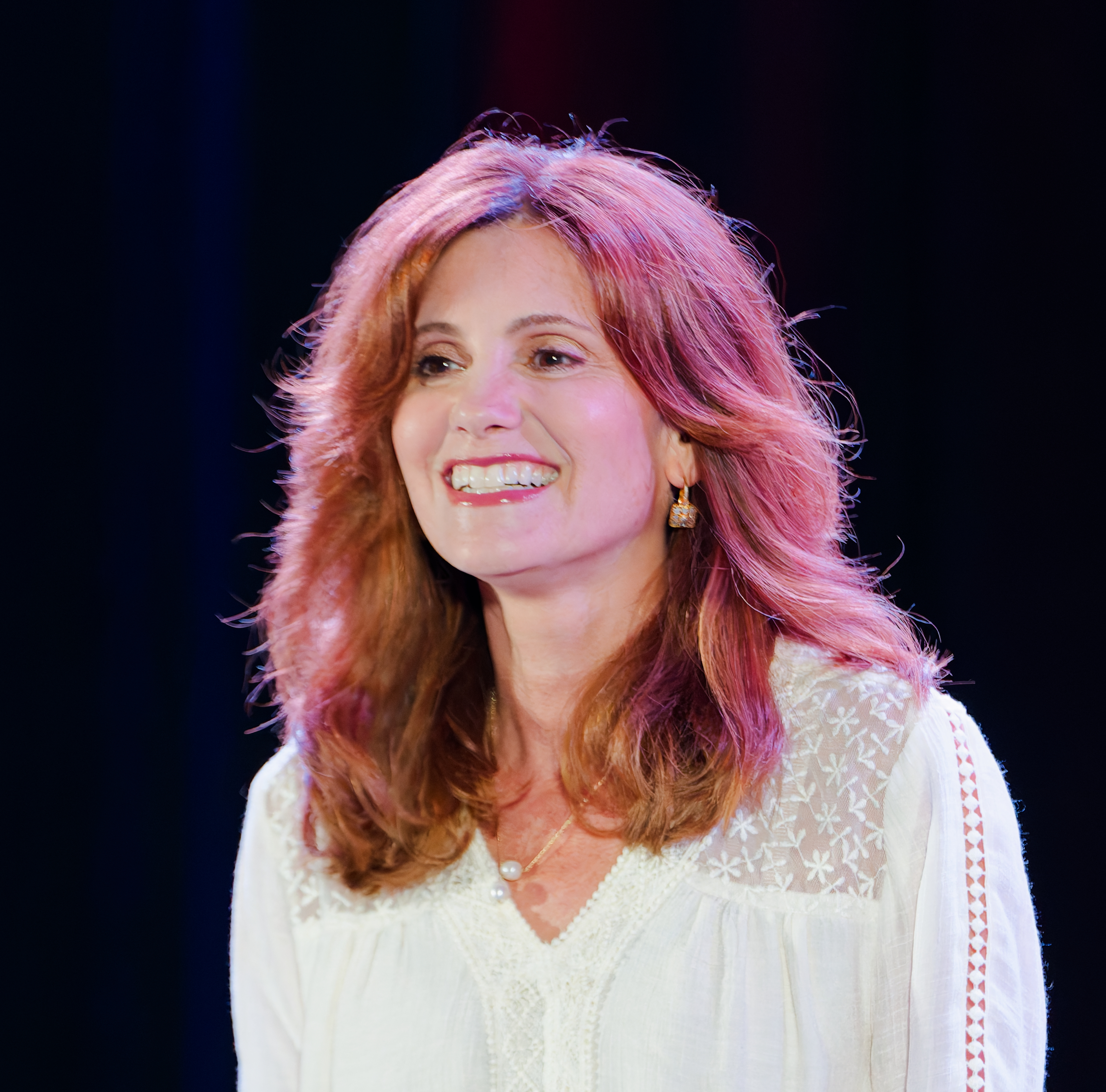
- Green in 2025
- Born: 1966 or 1967 (age 59–60); United States
- Occupation: Actress
- Years active: 1985–1994; 1999–2001; 2012

Kerri Green (born 1966 or 1967) is an American actress best known for her roles in The Goonies (1985), Summer Rental (1985), and Lucas (1986). She co-wrote and directed the film Bellyfruit (1999).

== Early life ==
Green grew up in Woodcliff Lake, New Jersey and graduated from Pascack Hills High School in Montvale. She attended Vassar College in Poughkeepsie, New York. She worked at a Roy Rogers restaurant near Woodcliff Lake, made commercials for Jordache jeans and Bold 3 detergent, and auditioned in New York City for acting jobs.

== Career ==
Green is best known for her roles as a young teen in a string of teen movies in the 1980s. Her big break came in the 1985 film The Goonies playing cheerleader-turned-adventurer Andrea "Andy" Carmichael. Two months later, she appeared in Summer Rental where she portrayed Jennifer Chester. She gained further critical acclaim for her performance in Lucas (1986) starring as the center of a love triangle between the characters of Corey Haim and Charlie Sheen. She played Robin in Three for the Road (1987), which featured Sheen and Alan Ruck. She appeared in a 1990 episode of In the Heat of the Night, performed in an independent film called Blue Flame, and played the role of secretary to Paul Reiser's character in two episodes of the television sitcom Mad About You.

Green eventually co-founded a film production company, Independent Women Artists with Bonnie Dickenson. With Dickenson, she co-wrote and directed the film adaptation of a play about teen pregnancy called Bellyfruit (1999).

== Personal life ==
Green took a break from acting to study art at Vassar College, where she was roommates with Marisa Tomei's brother Adam and with video game BioShock developer Ken Levine.

== Filmography ==
Film
Year	Title	Role	Notes
1985	The Goonies	Andrea "Andy" Carmichael	
1985	Summer Rental	Jennifer Chester	
1986	Lucas	Maggie	
1987	Three for the Road	Robin Kitteredge	
1993	Blue Flame	Rain	
1999	Bellyfruit	—N/a	Co-writer and director
2012	Complacent	Beth Wilkensen	

Television
Year	Title	Role	Notes
1987	The Disney Sunday Movie	Calpernia	Episode: "Young Harry Houdini"
1989	ABC Afterschool Special	Madeline Green	Episode: "Private Affairs"
1990	In the Heat of the Night	Karen Sevrance	Episode: "Triangle"
1992	Mad About You	Stacey	2 episodes
1992	The Burden of Proof	Kate Granum	Miniseries
1993	Tainted Blood	Tori Pattersen	Television film
1994	Café Americain	Kelly	Episode: "All About Kelly"
1994	Murder, She Wrote	Sara	Episode: "Murder of the Month Club"
2000	ER	Lynn Parker	Episode: "Match Made in Heaven"
2001	Law & Order: Special Victims Unit	Michelle	Episode: "Stolen"
