= Rebecca Broussard =

American actress and model (born 1963)

- Born: January 3, 1963 (age 63); Louisville, Kentucky, U.S.
- Occupations: Actress; model
- Years active: 1988–present
- Spouses: Richard Perry (m. 1987; div. 1988) Alex Kelly (m. 2001)
- Partner: Jack Nicholson (1989–1994)
- Children: Lorraine Nicholson; Ray Nicholson

Rebecca Broussard (born January 3, 1963) is an American actress and model.

She was born in Louisville, Kentucky. She graduated from Henderson County High School in Henderson, Kentucky in 1981. Her mother, also named Rebecca Broussard, was a major figure in the world of equestrian eventing.

From 1987 to 1988, Broussard was married to Richard Perry, a record executive who produced albums for Harry Nilsson, Julio Iglesias, Ringo Starr, and Carly Simon. She and Perry did not have children together. Broussard has two children with actor Jack Nicholson, with whom she was in a relationship from 1989 to 1994: daughter Lorraine (born 1990) and son Ray Nicholson (born 1992). Since 2001, she has been married to actor Alex Kelly; they do not have any children together.

== Filmography ==
Year	Title	Role	Notes
1988	Die Hard	Nakatomi hostage #3	
1990	The Two Jakes	Gladys	
1992	Man Trouble	Hospital Administrator	
1995	French Exit	Green Sweater Bimbette	
1995	Point of Betrayal	Monet Fletcher	
1996	Mars Attacks!	Hooker #2	
1996	Cannes Man	Rebecca Lerner	
1998	Tex Murphy: Overseer	Sylvia Linsky	Video Game
1998	Spanish Fly	American Woman	
1998	Ringmaster	Suzanne	
2000	Camera	Herself	
2009	Inside	Amelia Earhart	
