= Jonathan D. Krane =

American screenwriter (1952–2016)

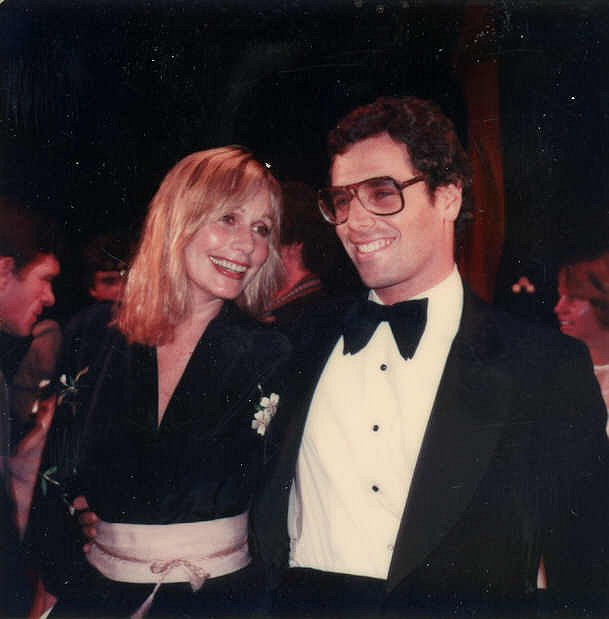
- Krane with Sally Kellerman (1979)
- Born: May 1, 1952; Hollywood, Los Angeles, California, US
- Died: August 1, 2016 (aged 64); Hollywood Hills, Los Angeles, California, US
- Education: St. John's College (BA); Yale University (JD)
- Occupations: Screenwriter; film producer; talent manager; studio head
- Years active: 1976 – 2016
- Known for: Partnership with John Travolta; CEO Blake Edwards Entertainment; CEO Management Company Entertainment Group
- Spouse: Sally Kellerman (m. 1980)
- Children: 2

Jonathan D. Krane (May 1, 1952 – August 1, 2016) was an American screenwriter, film producer, talent manager, and studio head. He's most known in Hollywood for his decade and a half partnership with John Travolta, whom he managed from 1987 until 2002. Together, they made some of Travolta's biggest films including Look Who's Talking (1989), Phenomenon (1996), Michael (1996), Face/Off (1997), Primary Colors (1998), General's Daughter (1999), Domestic Disturbance (2001), Swordfish (2001) and Basic (2003).

== Life ==
Krane was born in Hollywood, California, the son of a Los Angeles car-leasing executive. He graduated from Hollywood Hills High School at the age of 15, and earned his bachelor's degree in liberal arts at St. John's College. After finishing his undergraduate work, he lived for one year in England, France, and Greece, independently studying civil liberties in European criminal justice systems before returning to the states to study law at Yale Law School. He earned his Doctor of Jurisprudence in 1976.

He began his legal career as an associate at Los Angeles law firm of Irell & Manella, specializing in international motion picture taxation and entertainment law. This specialty would expose him to the world of entertainment and set him up for his future career as a talent manager and film producer.

He married actress Sally Kellerman on May 11, 1980, in a private ceremony at Jennifer Jones' Malibu home. They adopted newborn twins. The family resided in Jupiter, Florida from 1991 to 2008 when financial difficulties caused the sale of their condo there and they moved back to Hollywood. Kramer and Kellerman separated twice during their 36-year marriage, first for a few months in 1994, then again during 1997–98 over Krane's public affair with Nastassja Kinski. As Kellerman had dated married men in the past, she forgave her husband for the affair.

=== Management Company Entertainment Group ===
A chance meeting with Blake Edwards at an industry party would change the course of his career. Edwards was reportedly tired of working with the studio system and Krane pitched him his idea for a "new type of film studio." After further discussions, they partnered together to form Blake Edwards Entertainment, where Krane would serve as CEO. Krane would develop and produce the projects so Edwards could focus on writing and directing.

Their first project was the hit film Trail of the Pink Panther, which they followed up with Curse of the Pink Panther the next year. All told, they made seven films together before Krane left to expand his own company called Management Company Entertainment (MCE), which he had formed in 1983. The separation was not amicable, with Blake later saying he "was furious with Krane and no longer spoke to him because Krane had made all his contacts through Edwards and then left."

Krane took MCEG public in 1987 as "Management Company Entertainment Group", which made him the youngest CEO of a publicly traded company at the time.

In July 1989, MCEG acquired UK-based home video distributor Virgin Vision (including subsidiary Virgin Films) from the Virgin Group, and renamed it MCEG Virgin Vision. MCEG's existing home video divisions, including MCEG Home Video and Forum Home Video, were merged with the US division of Virgin Vision to form MCEG Virgin Home Entertainment. MCEG's acquisition of Virgin Vision was proved to be unsuccessful, and in 1990, MCEG filed for Chapter 11 bankruptcy. The company sold 85% of Virgin Vision to GE Capital, and the Virgin Group reacquired 15%. The US and Australian operations of MCEG Virgin Home Entertainment were shut down, while the UK branch remained in operation, and when Virgin's stake was sold to GE Capital in 1991, was renamed Vision Video Ltd. (VVL).

In 1992, John Kluge acquired MCEG and renamed it MCEG/Sterling Entertainment.

In 1995, MCEG/Sterling and two other companies owned by Kluge were merged into Orion Pictures to form the Metromedia International Group, which was acquired by Metro-Goldwyn-Mayer in 1997.

== Death ==
Krane died suddenly of a heart attack on August 1, 2016, at age 64 in his home in Hollywood Hills. His adopted daughter died less than four months later.

== Filmography ==
Year	Title	Role
1982	Trail of the Pink Panther	executive producer
1983	Curse of the Pink Panther	executive producer
1983	The Man Who Loved Women	executive producer
1984	Micki & Maude	executive producer
1986	A Fine Mess	executive producer
1986	That's Life!	producer
1987	Blind Date	executive producer
1988	You Can't Hurry Love	producer
1988	The Chocolate War	producer
1988	Slipping into Darkness	producer
1989	The Experts	executive producer
1989	Getting It Right	producer
1989	Catch Me If You Can	producer
1989	C.H.U.D. II: Bud the C.H.U.D.	producer
1989	Look Who's Talking	producer
1989	Limit Up	producer
1990	Without You I'm Nothing	producer
1990	Fatal Charm	executive producer producer
1990	Look Who's Talking Too	producer
1991	Chains of Gold	producer
1991	Cold Heaven	producer
1991	Convicts	producer
1992	Boris and Natasha: The Movie	producer
1992	Breaking the Rules	producer
1993	Look Who's Talking Now	producer
1994	Love Is a Gun	producer
1995	The Point of Betrayal	producer
1996	Phenomenon	executive producer
1996	Michael	producer
1997	Face/Off	executive producer
1997	Movies Kill	executive producer
1997	The Lay of the Land	producer
1997	Mad City	executive producer
1998	Primary Colors	executive producer
1999	The General's Daughter	executive producer
2000	Battlefield Earth	producer
2000	Lucky Numbers	producer
2000	Bar Hopping	producer
2001	Swordfish	producer
2001	Domestic Disturbance	producer
2003	Basic	producer
2007	The Prince and the Pauper: The Movie	executive producer
2010	Father of Invention	producer
