= The Mirisch Company =

American film production company

- Type: Subsidiary
- Industry: Film; Television; Animation
- Founded: 1957; 69 years ago
- Founders: Walter Mirisch; Marvin Mirisch; Harold Mirisch
- Defunct: 1963; 63 years ago
- Fate: Folded into United Artists
- Headquarters: Beverly Hills, California, United States
- Products: Motion pictures
- Parent: United Artists (1963–1981)

The Mirisch Company was an American film production company owned by Walter Mirisch and his brothers, Marvin and Harold Mirisch. The company also had sister firms known at various times as Mirisch Production Company, Mirisch Pictures Inc., Mirisch Films, and The Mirisch Corporation. The studio is best known for their production partnership with United Artists, and in 1963, a stock transfer gave ownership of the Mirisch Company to United Artists, though their modus operandi changed little.

== History ==
Walter Mirisch began to work as a producer at Monogram Pictures beginning with Fall Guy (1947), the profitable Bomba, the Jungle Boy series, Wichita (1955), and The First Texan (1956), by which time the company was known as Allied Artists. Walter Mirisch was in charge of production at the studio when it made Invasion of the Body Snatchers (1956) and Love in the Afternoon (1957).

The Mirisch Company was founded in 1957 at which time it signed a 12-picture deal with United Artists (UA) that was extended to 20 films two years later. Its first production was Man of the West (1958) starring Gary Cooper. UA acquired the company on March 1, 1963, but the Mirisch brothers continued to produce for their distribution, under other corporate names, in rented space at the Samuel Goldwyn Studio.

It produced many successful motion pictures for United Artists, beginning with the release of Fort Massacre (1958) but later including Some Like It Hot (1959), The Horse Soldiers (1959), The Apartment (1960), The Magnificent Seven (1960), West Side Story (1961), Follow That Dream (1962 with Elvis Presley), The Great Escape (1963), The Pink Panther (1963), Hawaii (1966), In the Heat of the Night (1967), The Thomas Crown Affair (1968), Fiddler on the Roof (1971), and many others.

In 1964, Mirisch Films Ltd, or Mirisch Films GB was formed in the United Kingdom for the production of 633 Squadron, A Shot in the Dark and several other films. The Pink Panther featured an animated Pink Panther, which soon became a star of a series of theatrical cartoons made by DePatie–Freleng Enterprises and released by Mirisch/UA. The cartoon series earned the partnership name of Mirisch-Geoffrey-DePatie-Freleng for the copyright of The Pink Panther and is used to this day by special arrangement through MGM for new cartoon specials and series.

Mirisch first entered television in 1959 with the series, Wichita Town for NBC. It also co-produced live-action television shows such as The Rat Patrol, Hey, Landlord and The Magnificent Seven television series, as well as a number of television movies and cartoon shows of The Super 6 and The Pink Panther Show. In 1965, the company, along with Lee Rich started Mirisch-Rich Television Productions, with the intent to produce shows for network television and it maintains headquarters in the Samuel Goldwyn Studios. Rich left in 1967 and it was soon renamed Mirisch Television Productions.

The company forged long-term associations with directors such as Billy Wilder, Blake Edwards, Robert Wise, George Roy Hill, William Wyler, J. Lee Thompson, John Sturges, and Norman Jewison, who directed three consecutive successes for it: The Russians Are Coming the Russians Are Coming (1966), In the Heat of the Night (1967), and The Thomas Crown Affair (1968).

== Filmography ==
The following films and television series were from Mirisch Companies:

- Fort Massacre (1958)
- Man of the West (1958)
- Some Like It Hot (1959)
- The Man in the Net (1959)
- The Gunfight at Dodge City (1959)
- The Horse Soldiers (1959)
- Cast a Long Shadow (1959)
- The Apartment (1960)
- The Magnificent Seven (1960)
- By Love Possessed (1961)
- Town Without Pity (1961)
- West Side Story (1961)
- One, Two, Three (1961)
- The Children's Hour (1961)
- Follow That Dream (1962)
- Kid Galahad (1962)
- Two for the Seesaw (1962)
- Irma la Douce (1963)
- The Great Escape (1963)
- Toys in the Attic (1963)
- Stolen Hours (1963)
- Kings of the Sun (1963)
- The Pink Panther (1964)
- 633 Squadron (1964)
- A Shot in the Dark (1964)
- Kiss Me, Stupid (1964)
- The Satan Bug (1965)
- The Hallelujah Trail (1965)
- A Rage to Live (1965)
- Return from the Ashes (1965)
- Cast a Giant Shadow (1966)
- The Russians Are Coming, the Russians Are Coming (1966)
- What Did You Do in the War, Daddy? (1966)
- Hawaii (1966)
- The Fortune Cookie (1966)
- Return of the Seven (1966)
- How to Succeed in Business Without Really Trying (1967)
- In the Heat of the Night (1967)
- Hour of the Gun (1967)
- Fitzwilly (1967)
- Attack on the Iron Coast (1968)
- The Party (1968)
- Submarine X-1 (1968)
- Inspector Clouseau (1968)
- The Thomas Crown Affair (1968)
- The First Time (1969)
- Sinful Davey (1969)
- Guns of the Magnificent Seven (1969)
- Some Kind of a Nut (1969)
- The Thousand Plane Raid (1969)
- Gaily, Gaily (1969)
- Hell Boats (1970)
- Halls of Anger (1970)
- The Last Escape (1970)
- Mosquito Squadron (1970)
- The Landlord (1970)
- The Hawaiians (1970)
- They Call Me Mister Tibbs! (1970)
- Cannon for Cordoba (1970)
- The Private Life of Sherlock Holmes (1970)
- The Organization (1971)
- Fiddler on the Roof (1971)
- The Magnificent Seven Ride! (1972)
- Avanti! (1972)
- Scorpio (1973)
- The Spikes Gang (1974)
- Mr. Majestyk (1974)
- Midway (1976)
- Gray Lady Down (1978)
- Same Time, Next Year (1979)
- The Prisoner of Zenda (1979)
- Dracula (1979)
- Romantic Comedy (1983)
- Various DePatie–Freleng and United Artists animated cartoons
  - The Pink Panther
  - The Inspector
  - Roland and Rattfink
  - The Ant and the Aardvark
  - Tijuana Toads/Texas Toads
  - The Blue Racer
  - Hoot Kloot
  - The Dogfather
  - Misterjaw
  - Crazylegs Crane
  - Dennis the Menace in Mayday for Mother (1981)
  - Goldilocks (1970)

Television series:

- Wichita Town (1959–1960)
- Peter Loves Mary (1960)
- The Super 6 (1966–1967)
- Hey, Landlord (1966–1967)
- The Rat Patrol (1966–1968)
- Super President (1967–1968)
- Here Comes the Grump (1969–1970)
- The Pink Panther Show (1969–1971)
- The New Pink Panther Show (1971–1974)
- The Pink Panther and Friends (1974–1976)
- The Pink Panther Laugh-and-a-Half Hour-and-a-Half Show (1976–1977)
- Think Pink Panther (1977–1978)
- The All New Pink Panther Show (1978)
- The Pink Panther and Sons (1984–1985)
- The Pink Panther (1993–1994)
- The Magnificent Seven (1998–1999)
- Pink Panther and Pals (2010)

Television films:

- High Midnight (1979)
- Desperado: The Outlaw Wars (1989)
- Desperado: Badlands Justice (1989)
- Tagget (1990)
