= Pink Panther (character) =

Fictional animated character

- The Pink Panther character
- First appearance: "The Pink Panther" (1963)
- Created by: Blake Edwards; Hawley Pratt; Friz Freleng
- Designed by: Hawley Pratt
- Voiced by: Rich Little (1965); Mel Blanc (1966–1967); Matt Frewer (1993–1995); Michael Sinterniklaas (1996–1997)

In-universe information
- Aliases: Pink; Pinky
- Species: Panther (leopard or jaguar)
- Gender: Male

The Pink Panther is a fictional animated character who appears in the opening or closing credit sequences of every film in The Pink Panther series (except for A Shot in the Dark and Inspector Clouseau). In the storyline of the original film, "Pink Panther" is the name of a valuable pink diamond named for a flaw that shows a "figure of a springing panther" when held up to the light in a certain way; in the credits, the diamond is personified by an animated, anthropomorphic panther with pink fur. In the original film series, only the first Pink Panther film and its sequel, The Return of the Pink Panther, featured the diamond.

The character's popularity spawned a spin-off franchise of theatrical shorts, television cartoons and merchandise. He starred in 124 short films, four TV series and four TV specials. The character is closely associated with "The Pink Panther Theme", composed by Henry Mancini.

== DePatie–Freleng/United Artists cartoons ==
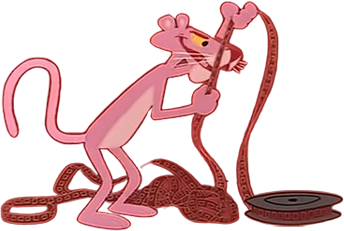
The Pink Panther in the trailer of The Pink Panther (1963)

The animated Pink Panther character's initial appearance in the live action film's title sequence, directed by Friz Freleng, was such a success with audiences and United Artists that the studio signed Freleng and his DePatie–Freleng Enterprises studio to a multi-year contract for a series of Pink Panther theatrical cartoon shorts. The first entry in the series, 1964's The Pink Phink, featured Pink harassing his foil, a little white mustachioed man who is often considered a caricature of Friz Freleng (this character is officially known as The Little Man), by constantly trying to paint the Little Man's blue house pink. The Pink Phink won the 1964 Academy Award for Animated Short Film, and subsequent shorts in the series, usually featuring the Pink Panther opposite the Little Man, were successful releases.

In an early series of Pink Panther animated cartoons, Pink generally remained silent, speaking only in two theatrical shorts, Sink Pink (one line) and Pink Ice (throughout the film). Rich Little provided Pink's voice in these shorts, modeling it on that of David Niven (who had portrayed Clouseau's jewel thief nemesis in the original live-action film). Years later, Little would overdub Niven's voice for Trail of the Pink Panther and Curse of the Pink Panther, due to Niven's ill health. All of the animated Pink Panther shorts utilized the distinctive jazzy theme music composed by Henry Mancini for the 1963 feature film, with additional scores composed by Walter Greene or William Lava.

== The Pink Panther Show ==
In the fall of 1969, the Pink Panther cartoons made their way to NBC television shown Saturday mornings via The Pink Panther Show. NBC added a laugh track to the original cartoons, with Marvin Miller brought on as an off-camera narrator talking to the Pink Panther during bumper segments featuring the Pink Panther and The Inspector together. The series featured a live-action introduction, over the theme song, which featured the Panthermobile.

Pink Panther shorts made after 1969 were produced for both broadcast and film release, typically appearing on television first, and released to theaters by United Artists. One version of the show was called The Think Pink Panther Show. A number of sister series joined The Pink Panther on movie screens and on the airwaves, among them The Ant and the Aardvark, Tijuana Toads (a.k.a. Texas Toads), Hoot Kloot, and Misterjaw (a.k.a. Mr. Jaws and Catfish). There were also a series of animated shorts called The Inspector, with the Clouseau-inspired Inspector and his sidekick Sgt. Deux-Deux, whom the Inspector is forever correcting. Other DePatie-Freleng series included Roland and Rattfink; The Dogfather, a loose parody of The Godfather following a canine crime family whose leader is based on Vito Corleone; and two Tijuana Toads spinoffs, The Blue Racer and Crazylegs Crane.

The German television version, which started airing in 1973, in ZDF was presented in 30-minute episodes, composed of one Pink Panther cartoon, one episode of The Inspector and one episode of The Ant and the Aardvark. Most notably, the difference between the German and the English version of the Pink Panther is a rhymed narration in the German version (spoken by voice actor Gert Günther Hoffmann), commenting and describing the plot. For this show, custom intro and end sequences were cut together from existing pieces of animation.

In 1976, the half-hour series was revamped into a 90-minute format, as The Pink Panther Laugh and a Half Hour and a Half Show; this version included a live-action segment, where the show's host, comedian Lenny Schultz, would read letters and jokes from viewers. This version flopped, and would change back to the original half-hour version in 1977.

In 1978, The Pink Panther moved to ABC and was rebranded The All New Pink Panther Show, where it lasted one season before leaving the network realm entirely. The ABC version of the series featured 16 episodes, with 32 new Pink Panther cartoons and 16 of Crazylegs Crane. The 32 entries were later released theatrically by United Artists.

== Comics ==
In 1971, Gold Key Comics began publishing a Pink Panther comic book, with art by Warren Tufts. The Pink Panther and the Inspector lasted 87 issues, ending only when Gold Key ceased operations in 1984. The spinoff series The Inspector (also from Gold Key) lasted 19 issues, from 1974 to 1978.

Tribune Media Services syndicated a Pink Panther comic strip from May 29, 2005, to May 10, 2009, created by Bottom Liners' cartoonists Eric and Bill Teitelbaum.

== Later television shows and specials ==
During the final years of the Panther's theatrical run, DePatie–Freleng produced a series of three primetime Pink Panther television specials for ABC. The first was in 1978 A Pink Christmas. It featured Pink in New York being cold and hungry looking for a holiday dinner. The other two specials premiered on ABC after the shorts officially ended in theaters, 1980's Olym-Pinks and in 1981 Pink at First Sight. In November 2007, the three specials were released on a single disc DVD collection, The Pink Panther: A Pink Christmas from MGM Home Entertainment/20th Century Fox Home Entertainment.

The studio was sold to Marvel Comics in 1981, and became Marvel Productions (now a part of The Walt Disney Company). During this time, the Pink Panther made a cameo appearance in Marvel's rival DC Comics cartoon, which was "Flight 601 Has Vanished," an episode of The Kid Super Power Hour with Shazam. In this episode, he was one of many characters plucked from their native dimensions and planets and brought to the fourth dimension to live life as a doll by a giant girl. He and the others were rescued by the Marvel Family. In 1984, a new Saturday morning series was produced entitled Pink Panther and Sons. In this incarnation (produced by Hanna-Barbera Productions with Freleng serving as creative producer for the series), the still-silent Pink Panther was a father of his two talking sons, Pinky and Panky. While popular, critics complained that there was not enough Pink Panther to maintain interest for a full 30 minutes.

A new series of cartoons were created in 1993, simply titled The Pink Panther, produced by Metro-Goldwyn-Mayer Animation, premiered in syndication in 1993, and had the Pink Panther speaking with the voice of Matt Frewer (of Max Headroom fame). DePatie and Freleng served as creative consultants on the series. Unlike the original shorts, not all episode titles contained the word "pink", although many instead contained the word "panther". Voice impressionist John Byner returned to voice both the Ant and the Aardvark.

In July 2007, Metro-Goldwyn-Mayer Studios Inc. and Jordan's Rubicon animation company began co-production of the animated series Pink Panther and Pals, a prequel to The Pink Panther Show, portraying a teenaged panther and his friends. The 26 episode TV series premiered worldwide in spring 2010 on Cartoon Network. On December 7, 2011, a new 22-minute holiday special entitled A Very Pink Christmas, starring the classic iteration of the panther, aired on ABC Family.

== Popular culture ==
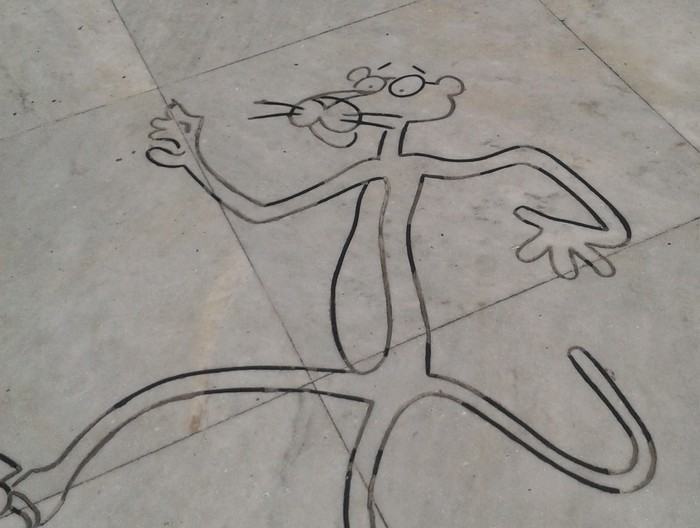
Engraving of the Pink Panther in A Coruña, Spain

The Pink Panther is known as Nathu and Pangu in East and South Asia, Paulchen Panther (Little Paul the Panther) in Germany and Пинко розовата пантера (Pinko the Pink panther) in Bulgaria. He remains a popular character. For a lot of children, the character has been engraved in their childhood as stuffed animals, costumes and even in coloring books. In addition to the regular airing of the classic cartoon, the panther also appears in the following:

=== Advertising ===
- The Pink Panther Show opening theme was used by Nike in a viral campaign of Pink Mercurial Vapor IV football boots using the French football star Franck Ribery mimicking the character of the Pink Panther.
- Owens Corning has featured the character since 1980 as an advertising mascot for their pink-colored Fiberglas residential building insulation. The year 2020 marked the 40th anniversary of the ongoing marketing agreement.
- The character has also been used as an advertising mascot for Sweet'n Low artificial sweetener, which is distributed in pink-colored packets. One television commercial for the product to promote The Pink Panther 2 features Regis Philbin talking to a taxi cab driver. After the camera changes the view, the driver is revealed to be the Pink Panther.

=== Games ===
The Pink Panther is featured in multiple computer and video games:

- The Pink Panther (1983), a hand-held LCD game from Tiger Electronics.
- Pink Panther (1988), published by Gremlin Graphics for various home computers.
- Pink Goes to Hollywood (1993) for the Genesis and Super NES
- The Pink Panther: Passport to Peril (1996)
- The Pink Panther: Hokus Pokus Pink (1997)
- The Pink Panther: Pinkadelic Pursuit (2003) for PC, PlayStation and Game Boy Advance

=== Products ===
- In Spain and Portugal, a Pantera Rosa cake is sold. It is coated in pink icing.
- Pink Panther Wafers have been available in the United Kingdom since the 1990s.
- In the U.S. From 1972 to about the late 1970s, Post Cereal produced Pink Panther Flakes as a sponsorship deal with United Artists Corporation. They consisted of smaller sphere-shaped corn cereal colored bubblegum-pink.
- Owens Corning, a building supply company based in the U.S., has utilized Pink Panther's image in the packaging and marketing of its line of PINK fiberglass wool insulation since 1979 following a decision to add red dye in the manufacturing process.

=== Television appearances ===
==== List of animated shows ====
Series number	Title	Broadcast run	Original channel	Total # episodes	Total # seasons
1	The Pink Panther Show	1969–1979	NBC (1969–1978); ABC (1978–1979)	Three 6-minute shorts + bumpers per half-hour	10
2	Pink Panther and Sons	1984–1986	NBC (1984–1985); ABC (1986)	26 episodes	1
3	The Pink Panther	1993–1995	Syndication	60 episodes	2
4	Pink Panther and Pals	2010	Cartoon Network	26 episodes	1

==== List of animated specials ====
- The Pink Panther in: A Pink Christmas (1978)
- The Pink Panther in: Olym-Pinks (1980)
- The Pink Panther in: Pink at First Sight (1981, Valentine's Day special)
- A Very Pink Christmas (2011)

== Charity ==
The Pink Panther is associated with a number of cancer awareness and support organizations. The Pink Panther is the mascot of the New Zealand Child Cancer foundation and for a line of clothing to promote breast cancer awareness. California based children's cancer charity The Gary L. Hoop Foundation humorously places The Pink Panther in various locations on its website and in its advertisements, paying homage to both the cartoon and their deceased namesake Gary Hoop, who once carried "The Pink Panther" as a nickname.

== Critical reception ==
Animation historian Jerry Beck has called the Pink Panther "the last great Hollywood cartoon character", noting that "Classic animation pretty much died in the '60s, everyone had kind of bailed out. But his creators didn't rest on their laurels. They didn't make the cartoons to look like Warner Bros. cartoons, or Disney cartoons, or the UPA look of Mister Magoo and Gerald McBoing-Boing. They came up with their own clever new style. The only other important cartoon of the '60s was Yellow Submarine."

The Pink Panther was a notable contribution to the animation art form. Top animation directors such as Hawley Pratt, Gerry Chiniquy, Robert McKimson, and Sid Marcus contributed to a distinctive style, supported by master story writer John W. Dunn. Produced after theatrical cartooning's golden age of the 1940s and '50s, they were constrained to the limited animation techniques applied to Saturday morning cartoons of the 1960s and after. Within these limitations, the Pink Panther made creative use of absurd and surreal themes and visual puns and an almost completely wordless pantomime style, set to the ubiquitous Pink Panther theme and its variations by Henry Mancini. The overall approach is reminiscent of the classic silent movies of Charlie Chaplin and Buster Keaton.

Cultural references were more muted and stylized, resulting in a cartoon with longer-term, more cross-cultural appeal not shared by contemporaries such as Yogi Bear and The Flintstones, with their greater reliance on contemporary American pop culture. The Pink Panther also remained constrained to the classic six-minute form of theatrical shorts, while contemporaries expanded into longer, sitcom-like storylines, up to a full 30 minutes of broadcast TV in the case of The Flintstones. Freleng's colleagues credit his sense of creative timing as a key element to the cartoon's artistic success. Freleng himself regarded the Pink Panther as his finest achievement and the character he most identified with, according to family and colleagues interviewed on the 2006 DVD release.

== Co-stars of The Pink Panther Show ==
=== Television ===
- Misterjaw (1976)
- Texas Toads (1976) (rebranded version of Tijuana Toads, using Texan themes instead of Mexican ones)
- Crazylegs Crane (1978)
- Annie (1984)
- Chatta (1984)
- Murfel (1984)
- Panky (1984)
- Pinky (1984)
- Punkin (1984)
- Rocko (1984)
- Thelma (1993)
- Horse (2010)

=== Theatrical ===
- The Inspector (1965–1969)
- Roland and Rattfink (1968–1971)
- The Ant and the Aardvark (1969–1971)
- Tijuana Toads (1969–1972)
- The Blue Racer (1972–1974)
- Hoot Kloot (1973–1974)
- The Dogfather (1974–1976)

== See also ==
- List of The Pink Panther cartoons
