= The Tiny Tree =

1975 Christmas television special

- Genre: Christmas special
- Created by: Chuck Couch
- Written by: Chuck Couch; Bob Ogle; Lewis Marshall
- Directed by: Chuck Couch
- Voices of: Buddy Ebsen; Paul Winchell; Frank Welker; Allan Melvin; Cherilyn Parsons; Hettie Lynne Hurtes; Stephen Manley; Lucille Bliss; Janet Waldo
- Narrated by: Buddy Ebsen
- Composers: Dean Elliott; Johnny Marks
- Country of origin: United States
- Original language: English

Production
- Executive producers: David H. DePatie; Friz Freleng
- Producer: Chuck Couch
- Editors: Roger Donley; Ron Fedele; Robert T. Gillis; Joe Siracusa; Rick Steward
- Running time: 30 minutes
- Production company: DePatie–Freleng Enterprises

Original release
- Network: NBC
- Release: December 14, 1975

The Tiny Tree is a 1975 American animated Christmas television special produced by DePatie–Freleng Enterprises. Created, produced and directed by Chuck Couch, the special was first broadcast at 7:30 PM on NBC on December 14, 1975, airing as part of the Bell System Family Theater, sponsored by Bell Telephone. (Note: Attributed to multiple references:) It received a Daytime Emmy Awards nomination for "Outstanding Individual Achievement in Any Area of Creative Technical Crafts" in 1976, and was rerun into the 1980s.

== Plot ==
Squire Badger narrates the story to two young rabbits. When a family with a little disabled girl in a wheelchair moves into a long-empty farmhouse, the local animals introduce the girl to a tiny whispering pine tree in the meadow, and the two bond together, enjoying each other's company through the year. That winter, a blizzard buries the land and endangers the animals with starvation. When Horace Hawk the vegetarian visualizes Mole as a berry and tries to eat him, the girl hurries outside to stop him but falls from her chair and remains in bed on Christmas Eve. Learning that the girl's father couldn't obtain her presents and a Christmas tree from town, the whispering pine volunteers to be her Christmas tree, so the animals transplant him outside her window and decorate him with natural items, except for a star tree topper. The Morning Star, the first light of Christmas Day, provides this final touch that also heals the little girl as she and all the animals rejoice.

== Voice cast ==
- Buddy Ebsen as Squire Badger
- Paul Winchell as Turtle
- Frank Welker as Groundhog, Father Bird, Beaver and Mole
- Allan Melvin as Horace Hawk
- Cherilyn Parsons as Girl Bunny
- Hettie Lynne Hurtes as Girl Porcupine, Bird and Firefly
- Stephen Manley as Boy Bunny and Girl Raccoon
- Lucille Bliss as Field Mouse
- Janet Waldo as Lady Bird and Little Girl

== Production ==
In 1958-1962, Warner Bros. Pictures produced four specials for The Bell Laboratory Science Series; Gateways to the Mind, The Alphabet Conspiracy, Thread of Life, and About Time. The specials each had animated segments, directed by Chuck Jones, Friz Freleng, Robert McKimson and Phil Monroe. Animator and writer Chuck Couch produced and directed three films for Bell around this time; Talking of Tomorrow, Mr. Digit and the Battle of Bubbling Brook, and TASI, The Time Machine. In the 1970s, while working at Hanna-Barbera, Couch wrote a story for a special called The Tiny Tree, and pitched it to the Bell Family Theater. DePatie–Freleng Enterprises was hired to produce the special. The characters were designed by Disney and MGM animator Louis Schmitt, and voiced by Buddy Ebsen, Paul Winchell, Frank Welker, Allan Melvin, Cherilyn Parsons, Hettie Lynne Hurtes, Stephen Manley, Lucille Bliss and Janet Waldo. The music was composed by Dean Elliott and Johnny Marks; Marks wrote and composed seven songs for the special, and also included "I Heard the Bells on Christmas Day", performed by Ebsen. Two of the songs, "To Love and Be Loved" and "When Autumn Comes", were produced and arranged by Leon Pendarvis and sung by Roberta Flack. Marks stated that the former song "captures the whole meaning of Christmas", with the special itself "built on" it.
