= The Pink Panther Show =

Showcase of animated shorts

- Title card from the 1980 syndicated version of The Pink Panther Show
- Genre: Comedy; Slapstick; Anthology
- Created by: David H. DePatie; Friz Freleng
- Based on: The Pink Panther by Blake Edwards
- Voices of: Rich Little; Daws Butler; John Byner; Don Diamond; Pat Harrington, Jr. Paul Frees; Bob Holt; Arte Johnson; Diana Maddox; Larry D. Mann; Bob Ogle; Arnold Stang; Lennie Weinrib; Frank Welker; Paul Winchell; Mel Blanc; June Foray; Helen Gerald; Joan Gerber; Mark Skor
- Narrated by: Marvin Miller
- Theme music composer: Henry Mancini
- Composers: Henry Mancini; Doug Goodwin; Walter Greene; Steve DePatie; William Lava
- Country of origin: United States
- Original language: English
- No. of seasons: 10

Production
- Producers: David H. DePatie; Friz Freleng; Jim Foss; Bill Orcutt; Harry Love
- Running time: 6–7 minutes
- Production companies: Mirisch Films; MGM Television; Animation: DePatie–Freleng Enterprises

Original release
- Network: NBC
- Release: September 6, 1969 – September 2, 1978
- Network: ABC
- Release: September 9, 1978 – September 1, 1979

Related
- Pink Panther and Sons

The Pink Panther Show is an American anthology showcase of animated shorts produced by David H. DePatie and Friz Freleng between 1969 and 1978, starring the animated Pink Panther character from the opening credits of the live-action films. The series was produced by Mirisch Films and DePatie–Freleng Enterprises, and was broadcast Saturday mornings on two American television networks: from September 6, 1969, to September 2, 1978, on NBC; and from September 9, 1978, to September 1, 1979, on ABC.

== History ==
=== Format ===
When The Pink Panther Show first aired in 1969, it consisted of one cartoon featuring The Inspector, sandwiched by two Pink Panther entries. Due to the number of shorts produced, two episodes feature a Pink Panther cartoon sandwiched by two Inspector entries. The 30-minute show was then connected via bumper sequences featuring both the panther and Inspector together, with announcer Marvin Miller acting as an off-camera narrator talking to the panther. Bumper sequences consisted of newly animated segments as well as recycled footage from existing cartoons We Give Pink Stamps, Reel Pink, Pink Outs and Super Pink, fitted with new incidental music and voice-over work from Miller.

Pink Panther shorts that were produced after 1969 (starting with A Fly in the Pink) were made for both broadcast and theatrical release, typically appearing on television first, and released to theaters by United Artists. A number of new series were created, including The Ant and the Aardvark, Tijuana Toads (redubbed as “Texas Toads”), Hoot Kloot, Misterjaw, Roland and Rattfink, The Dogfather and two Tijuana Toads spinoffs: The Blue Racer and Crazylegs Crane. The New Pink Panther Show and later shows featured newly animated bumper segments involving the Panther, the Ant and the Aardvark, Misterjaw, and the Texas Toads.

By this time, due to the violent nature of some of the cartoons, they were re-edited for television by omitting the cartoon violent scenes from their broadcasts, in order to make them more family friendly.

In 1976, the half-hour series was revamped into a 90-minute format, as The Pink Panther Laugh-and-a-Half Hour-and-a-Half Show; this version included a live-action segment, where comedian Lenny Schultz would read letters and jokes from viewers. This version performed poorly and eventually reverted to the original 30-minute version in 1977 as Think Pink Panther.

After nine years on NBC, the Pink Panther moved to ABC in 1978 and was retitled The All New Pink Panther Show, where it lasted one season before leaving the network realm entirely. The tenth season featured 16 episodes with 32 new Pink Panther cartoons, and 16 featuring Crazylegs Crane: no bumpers were produced for The All New Pink Panther Show, but 10 second "Stay tuned..." bumpers explaining an upcoming entry were produced for the first several episodes. The 32 All New Pink Panther Show entries were eventually released to theaters by United Artists.

=== Theme music ===
Henry Mancini composed "The Pink Panther Theme" for the live action films, which would be used extensively in the cartoon series as well. Doug Goodwin composed the show's opening title music while William Lava and Walter Greene composed music scores heard throughout the cartoons, many of which were variations on Mancini's "Pink Panther Theme".

=== Laugh track ===
By the time of the show's 1969 debut, fitting cartoon and children's shows with a laugh track was standard practice. In keeping with this standard, NBC added a laugh track to all seasons of The Pink Panther Show, marking the first time in history that theatrical films were fitted with a laugh track for television broadcast (Season 2 utilized an inferior laugh track, utilizing isolated laugh clips from Season 1). This was an anomaly, as other theatrical cartoon series that were airing successfully on television (i.e. Tom and Jerry, Woody Woodpecker, Looney Tunes, Popeye) did not receive this addition.

The soundtracks were restored to their original theatrical form in 1982 when the DFE theatrical package went into syndication. Repackaging over the years has resulted in both theatrical and television versions of the entries being available. The exceptions were Misterjaw and Crazylegs Crane, which were produced specifically for television and never re-released theatrically, resulting in laughter-only versions. The American-based Boomerang occasionally airs versions with the laugh track intact, though these versions are more commonly found outside of the United States, such as on the BBC Two repeats circa 2011 in the United Kingdom, The Spanish language Boomerang requires that MGM supply them with laugh track-only versions of all shorts. The Portuguese language Boomerang, France-based Gulli, and Poland channels TV 4 and TV6 also broadcast certain entries utilizing laugh track versions. Some laugh tracked shorts also appear on the Pink Panther YouTube channel.

=== Incarnations ===
Over its 10 years on various television networks, The Pink Panther Show had a variety of names:

- The Pink Panther Show (1969–1971, also considered the umbrella title of the series)
- The New Pink Panther Show (1971–1974)
- The Pink Panther and Friends (1974-1976)
- The Pink Panther Laugh-and-a-Half Hour-and-a-Half Show (1976–1977)
- The Think Pink Panther Show (1977–78)
- The All New Pink Panther Show (1978–1979)
- The Pink Panther Show (1980, Syndicated)

== Syndication ==
United Artists Television syndicated The Pink Panther Show in 1980, complete with bumpers and laugh-tracked versions of the shorts. By 1982, MGM Television began syndicating some individual cartoons to local stations to air them as they saw fit. This format did not contain the series' bumpers nor the laugh track.

The following series were included in MGM Television's syndication package:

- The Pink Panther
- The Inspector
- The Ant and the Aardvark
- Tijuana Toads/Texas Toads
- Misterjaw (made-for-television series)

The following series were not included in the MGM Television distribution package:

- Roland and Rattfink
- The Blue Racer
- Hoot Kloot
- The Dogfather
- Crazylegs Crane (made-for-television series)

Most television stations aired the later package released in 1982, featuring the cartoon shorts by themselves, isolated from the show's original bumpers sequences. The laugh track was also silenced on all entries except for Misterjaw. WGN-TV in Chicago was one of the few stations to air the 1980 The Pink Panther Show syndication package. Conversely, its New York City sister station WPIX featured a stripped-down version of the shorts, airing the entries without the laugh track, bumpers, or theatrical opening/closing credits.

=== Reruns ===
The Pink Panther Show (1969–1971) and The New Pink Panther Show (1971–1974) has been remastered in its original format. It was previously shown on BBC Two, UK Gold, BBC One, Boomerang (2000–2009) and Cartoon Network (1993–2002) in the UK. In the late 2000s, it aired in Canada on Teletoon Retro weekday mornings at 8:00 am. Teletoon Retro showed all 32 episodes of The Pink Panther Show with the panther and the Inspector, all 17 episodes of The New Pink Panther Show with the panther and the Ant and the Aardvark, and select episodes of the first syndicated Pink Panther Show series (only those episodes with the middle cartoon being an episode of The Ant and The Aardvark). Teletoon Retro then showed all 16 episodes of The All New Pink Panther Show, with the panther and Crazylegs Crane. The laugh track is muted for most entries.

The episodes shown on Teletoon Retro also featured remastered versions, while the wrap-around content was in rougher condition. The Inspector cartoon, Tour de Farce, had the wrong title card, that for Reaux, Reaux, Reaux Your Boat.

In the United States, Cartoon Network reran The Pink Panther Show from 1997 to 1999, and intermittently in 2006, 2009, and 2012. A "no-frills" version aired on Boomerang from 2005 to 2012 for five days a week at 5:30 am, 10 am and 2:30 pm; the Boomerang version included four shorts and no bumpers, in the style of its other theatrical-short compilation shows. Until August 2009, Boomerang only featured shorts from The Pink Panther, The Ant and the Aardvark and The Inspector. The laugh track was present on several entries. It also aired on the Spanish Language Boomerang TV channel with most entries containing their original laugh track.

In the Arab world, it was shown on Spacetoon from 2014 to 2017, due to Spacetoon airing The Pink Panther and low reception from Spacetoon viewers.

The show also previously aired in its original format on This TV on Tuesdays and Thursdays at 8:30 am Eastern Time or 7:30 am Central Time (as part of its Cookie Jar Toons programming block) until September 22, 2011. The digital broadcast network Light TV ran the series when the network launched Christmas weekend 2016 until September 29, 2019. On June 1, 2020 to May 29, 2022, the show aired for the first time in Spanish on Galavisión, known as El show de la Pantera Rosa.

From May 2021 to May 2023, MeTV reran the show under the name Pink Panther's Party, during their Saturday morning block, Saturday Morning Cartoons, from 7:30 am to 8:00 am ET/ 6:30 to 7:00 am CT following Popeye and Pals, which aired from 7:00 am to 7:30 am ET/ 6:00 am to 6:30 am CT. The show is collectively called Popeye and Pink Panther's Party, combining Popeye and Pals and Pink Panther's Party into a single show. However, the channel lost the rights to air the non-WB DePatie-Freleng cartoons, which caused Popeye And Pink Panther's Party to be reverted to Popeye and Pals, which only airs Popeye shorts.

Amazon Prime carries The New Pink Panther Show episodes (As of 2023) for free for Prime members. The Pink Panther Show, The New Pink Panther Show, The Pink Panther & Friends (using the syndicated intro), and the aforementioned syndication version have appeared on the Pink Panther Facebook page.

== Cast ==
- Rich Little as Pink Panther (on some episodes)
- Daws Butler as Pug, Louie
- John Byner as Charlie Ant, Blue Aardvark
- Larry D. Mann as Blue Racer, Crazylegs Crane
- Frank Welker as Crazylegs Crane Jr., Dragonfly
- Paul Frees as Narrator, Texan hunter, The Commissioner
- Don Diamond as Toro
- Tom Holland as Pancho
- Pat Harrington, Jr. as The Inspector, Sergeant Deux-Deux
- Bob Holt as Hoot Kloot, Hoot Kloot's Horse, Dogfather
- Arte Johnson as Misterjaw
- Bob Ogle as Harry Halibut
- Arnold Stang as Catfish
- Lennie Weinrib as Roland, Rattfink, Scotland Yard Captain
- Paul Winchell as Fearless Freddy
- Don Messick as Sergeant Deux-Deux
- Marvin Miller as Narrator, The Commissioner, The Inspector, Sergeant Deux-Deux
- Larry Storch as The Commissioner
- Mark Skor as The Commissioner
- Mel Blanc as Drunk, Drunk's wife
- Diana Maddox as Commissioner's wife

== Series overview ==
=== The Pink Panther Show (1969–1971) ===
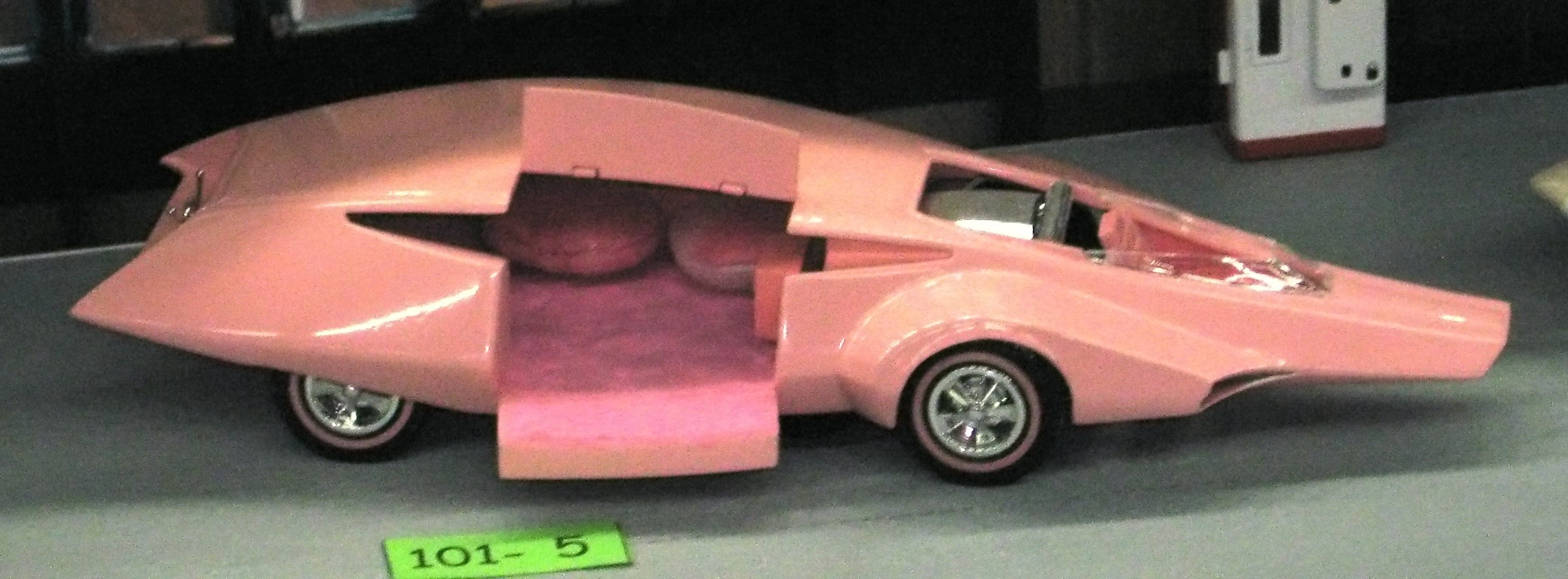
A kit of the Panthermobile, which appeared during the 1969–1970 season

The first season of The Pink Panther Show (1969–1971) consisted of one The Inspector entry sandwiched by two Pink Panther entries. The show was "hosted" by The Pink Panther and The Inspector, seen during the opening sequence, which showed a boy driving the Panthermobile from the countryside to Grauman's Chinese Theatre in Hollywood. During the journey, images of animals mentioned in the song (rhinoceros, tiger, cats, American mink) are seen alongside clips of the panther from Reel Pink, Come On In! The Water's Pink and Put Put Pink. Upon arrival, the Pink Panther and the Inspector then disembark from the Panthermobile and enter the famous theatre. In the ending credits, the Inspector climbs back into the Panthermobile, but leaves the Pink Panther behind, who is seen chasing after the car.

The entries utilized for the second season featured complete original theatrical titles. With only two exceptions, the first and third cartoons of each episode were Pink Panthers, and second was an Inspector. In the two exceptions, the first and third cartoons were Inspectors, and the middle one was a Pink Panther. Unlike Season 1, a full laugh track wasn't used but rather an abridged version using isolated laughs from Season 1 edited onto the soundtrack by DFE (these inferior versions currently in circulation are marked with †). Seasons 1 and 2 were repackaged as a single Season 1 in the 2000s.

==== Season 1 (1969–1970) ====
#	First cartoon	Second cartoon	Third cartoon	Original air date
01	The Pink Blueprint	Bomb Voyage	The Pink Tail Fly	September 6, 1969
02	Pinto Pink	Le Pig-Al Patrol	In the Pink	September 13, 1969
03	Jet Pink	The Pique Poquette of Paris	Tickled Pink	September 20, 1969
04	The Pink Pill	Plastered in Paris	Pink Pistons (mistitled Pink Piston)	September 27, 1969
05	Rock A Bye Pinky	Toulouse La Trick	Sink Pink	October 4, 1969
06	Prehistoric Pink	Reaux, Reaux, Reaux Your Boat	Come On In! The Water's Pink	October 11, 1969
07	Pink Pest Control	Tour de Farce	Pink-A-Boo	October 18, 1969
08	Pink Panic	Transylvania Mania	An Ounce of Pink	October 25, 1969
09	Prefabricated Pink	Le Bowser Bagger	Sky Blue Pink	November 1, 1969
10	Dial "P" for Pink	Napoleon Blown-Aparte	Bully for Pink	November 8, 1969
11	Pink Sphinx (mistitled The Pink Sphinx)	Cock-a-Doodle Deux Deux	The Pink Phink	November 15, 1969
12	Pink of the Litter	The Great De Gaulle Stone Operation	Shocking Pink	November 22, 1969
13	Pink Valiant	Le Quiet Squad	The Hand Is Pinker Than the Eye	November 29, 1969
14	Reel Pink	Les Miserobots	Smile Pretty, Say Pink	December 6, 1969
15	Put-Put, Pink	French Freud	Pink is a Many Splintered Thing	December 13, 1969
16	Extinct Pink	Le Great Dane Robbery	The Pink Quarterback	December 20, 1969
17	Genie With the Light Pink Fur	Cherche Le Phantom	Pinknic	December 27, 1969

==== Season 2 (1970–1971) ====
#	First cartoon	Second cartoon	Third cartoon	Original air date
01	G.I. Pink	Carte Blanched	Pinkadilly Circus	September 12, 1970
02	Lucky Pink	The Shooting of Caribou Lou	Pink in the Clink	September 19, 1970
03	Little Beaux Pink	Bear de Guerre	The Pink Package Plot	September 26, 1970
04	Pierre and Cottage Cheese	Pinkcome Tax	Cirrhosis of the Louvre	October 3, 1970
05	Pink Pajamas	Sicque! Sicque! Sicque!	Pink Ice	October 10, 1970
06	Pickled Pink	Ape Suzette	Pinkfinger	October 17, 1970
07	Pink Punch	Unsafe and Seine	Vitamin Pink	October 24, 1970
08	Pink, Plunk, Plink	That's No Lady — That's Notre Dame!	Pink Outs	October 31, 1970
09	Pink Paradise	Sacre Bleu Cross	Congratulations It's Pink	November 7, 1970
10	Psychedelic Pink	Le Escape Goat	Pink Posies	November 14, 1970
11	Super Pink	Le Cop on Le Rocks	Twinkle, Twinkle, Little Pink	November 21, 1970
12	Slink Pink	Canadian Can-Can	Pink-A-Rella	November 28, 1970
13	In the Pink of the Night	London Derriere	Think Before You Pink	December 5, 1970
14	Pink Panzer	La Feet's Defeat	Pink on the Cob	December 12, 1970
15	Le Ball and Chain Gang	We Give Pink Stamps	Crow de Guerre	December 19, 1970

=== The New Pink Panther Show (1971–1974) ===
The New Pink Panther Show (1971–1974) featured a new opening and closing sequence and theme song, pitting the attention-seeking Aardvark against the panther. The show's new title song, "Pantherly Pride", was written by Doug Goodwin and played over the opening sequence.

This incarnation aired The Ant and the Aardvark during the 1971–1972 season. Later seasons swapped The Ant and the Aardvark with theatrical series' Roland and Rattfink, Hoot Kloot or The Blue Racer, as well as reruns of The Inspector. Only eight new Pink Panther cartoons were produced in 1971 (in bold).

#	The Pink Panther Entry 1	The Ant and the Aardvark	The Pink Panther Entry 2	Original air date
01	In the Pink of the Night	Technology, Phooey	Super Pink	September 11, 1971
02	Think Before You Pink	Ants in the Pantry	Pink-A-Rella	September 18, 1971
03	Twinkle Twinkle Little Pink	Isle of Caprice	Pink Punch	September 25, 1971
04	Pink on the Cob	Rough Brunch	Congratulations It's Pink	October 2, 1971
05	Pink Outs	Scratch a Tiger	Pink, Plunk, Plink	October 9, 1971
06	Extinct Pink	Science Friction	Pink Paradise	October 16, 1971
07	**A Fly In the Pink**	The Ant From Uncle	Pinkfinger	October 23, 1971
08	**Pink Blue Plate**	The Froze Nose Knows	Little Beaux Pink	October 30, 1971
09	**Pink Tuba-Dore**	Dune Bug	Sink Pink	November 6, 1971
10	**Pink-In**	Don't Hustle an Ant With Muscle †	The Pink Tail Fly	November 13, 1971
11	**Psst Pink**	Never Bug an Ant	The Pink Blueprint	November 20, 1971
12	Psychedelic Pink	The Ant and the Aardvark	**Gong with the Pink**	November 27, 1971
13	**Pink Pranks**	Hasty But Tasty	In the Pink	December 4, 1971
14	**The Pink Flea**	I've Got Ants in My Plans	Pinto Pink	December 11, 1971
15	Slink Pink	Odd Ant Out	Tickled Pink	December 18, 1971
16	Pinkadilly Circus	From Bed to Worse	Pinkcome Tax	December 25, 1971
17	We Give Pink Stamps	Mumbo Jumbo	Lucky Pink	January 1, 1972

=== The Pink Panther and Friends (1974–1976) ===
The Pink Panther and Friends (1974–1976) followed the same format as The New Pink Panther Show. The first Pink Panther entry was a new episode, while the second was a rebroadcast of an old entry. Bumpers featuring The Inspector and The Ant and the Aardvark connected the three entries. New series The Dogfather (originally produced for theatrical release) was also added to broadcasts, in addition to The Blue Racer or Hoot Kloot.

#	The Pink Panther New entry	The Ant and the Aardvark Rebroadcast	The Pink Panther Rebroadcast
01	Salmon Pink	The Ant and the Aardvark	The Pink Phink
02	Pink Streaker	Never Bug an Ant	Reel Pink
03	Pink Plasma	The Ant from Uncle	The Pink Tail Fly
04	Pink Campaign	Technology Phooey	Smile Pretty Say Pink
05	Pink Piper	Hasty But Tasty	The Pink Blueprint
06	Bobolink Pink	Isle of Caprice	Pink-A-Boo
07	Trail of the Lonesome Pink	Dune Bug	Pink, Plunk, Plink
08	Pink Aye	Ants in the Pantry	Genie With the Light Pink Fur
09	Keep Our Forests Pink	Science Friction	Super Pink
10	Pink DaVinci	Odd Ant Out	Prefabricated Pink
11	Forty Pink Winks	Rough Brunch	Pink Outs
12	Sherlock Pink	I've Got Ants in My Plans	Pinkadilly Circus
13	Therapeutic Pink	Don't Hustle an Ant With Muscle	Come On In! The Water's Pink!
14	Pink Elephant	Scratch a Tiger	Twinkle Twinkle Little Pink
15	It's Pink But Is It Mink?	The Froze Nose Knows	Pink Pest Control
16	The Scarlet Pinkernel	Mumbo Jumbo	Slink Pink
17	Mystic Pink	From Bed to Worse	In the Pink of the Night

=== The Pink Panther Laugh-and-a-Half Hour-and-a-Half Show (1976–1977) ===
The Pink Panther Laugh-and-a-Half Hour-and-a-Half Show was an attempt by DFE to revamp the traditional format of three entries airing in a 30-minute format. The show was expanded to 90 minutes, and included a live-action segment featuring comedian Lenny Schultz reading letters from viewers. The show also featured two new made-for-television series, a first for the franchise: the Texas Toads (a redubbed version of the theatrical Tijuana Toads series), and Misterjaw. New bumper sequences featuring both the Texas Toads and Misterjaw were created for the series. These new entries were aired in combination with rebroadcasts of The Pink Panther, The Inspector and The Ant and the Aardvark.

The Pink Panther Laugh-and-a-Half Hour-and-a-Half Show did not do well in the ratings, so it lasted only one season.

=== The Think Pink Panther Show (1977–1978) ===
The final series broadcast on NBC, The Think Pink Panther Show reverted to the traditional 30-minute format and consisted of rebroadcasts. No new cartoons were created for this show. The opening sequence was based on “The Pink Phink”. The layout of the closing credits was based on The New Pink Panther Show.

A segment was called “Dear Pink Panther”, where Pink Panther would show jokes from viewers (possibly reused from the previous season).

=== The All New Pink Panther Show (1978–1979) ===
The All New Pink Panther Show (1978–1979) was a new version of the series commenced after NBC's broadcast of the series ended its nine-year run. For its tenth season, ABC picked up the series and requested 32 new made-for-television Pink Panther shorts, along with 16 entries for the new Crazylegs Crane segment. A disco-flavored rendition of Henry Mancini's "Pink Panther Theme" was used for the opening and closing credits, with the closing credits featuring Pink Panther disco-dancing. "Stay Tuned" bumpers were produced for ten episodes as well (marked in bold).

#	The Pink Panther Entry 1	Crazylegs Crane	The Pink Panther Entry 2	Original Air Date
01	**Pink Bananas**	**Crane Brained**	**Pinktails for Two**	September 9, 1978
02	**Pink Arcade**	**Life with Feather**	**Pink S.W.A.T**	September 16, 1978
03	Pink Suds	King of the Swamp	Pink Pull	September 23, 1978
04	**Toro Pink**	**Winter Blunderland**	**Pink in the Woods**	September 30, 1978
05	**Spark Plug Pink**	**Sonic Broom**	**Pink Breakfast**	October 7, 1978
06	**Pink Lightning**	**Storky and Hatch**	**Pink in the Drink**	October 14, 1978
07	**Doctor Pink**	**Bug Off**	**Pink Pictures**	October 21, 1978
08	**Supermarket Pink**	**Animal Crack-ups**	**String Along in Pink**	October 28, 1978
09	**Pink Lemonade**	**Fly-by-Knight**	**Pink Trumpet**	November 4, 1978
10	**Dietetic Pink**	**Sneaker Snack**	**Sprinkle Me Pink**	November 11, 1978
11	Pink Daddy	Barnacle Bird	Cat and the Pinkstalk	November 18, 1978
12	Pink Quackers	Jet Feathers	Pink and Shovel	November 25, 1978
13	Yankee Doodle Pink	Beach Bummer	Pinkologist	December 2, 1978
14	Pet Pink Pebbles	Nest Quest	The Pink of Bagdad	December 9, 1978
15	**Pink Press**	**Flower Power**	**Pink U.F.O**	December 16, 1978
16	Pink Z-Z-Z	Trail of the Lonesome Mine	Star Pink	December 23, 1978

=== The Pink Panther Show (1980, syndicated) ===
United Artists Television syndicated a weekday 30-minute Pink Panther show in 1980, complete with bumpers and laugh-tracked versions of the shorts. A new opening sequence preceding the show featured Henry Mancini's "Pink Panther Theme" played under a segment from Pink Outs featuring the Pink Panther folding the backdrop into a square to be eaten. The closer featured the last few seconds of the theme played under a scene from Reel Pink featuring the panther water skiing.

UATV created two versions of the syndication package. The first consisted of The Pink Panther, Inspector, The Ant and the Aardvark and Texas Toads entries sourced from film elements utilized during the program's original network run.

The second version consisted of The Pink Panther, The Ant and the Aardvark and Misterjaw entries sourced from new prints of the original film negatives and transferred to videotape, resulting in sharper images. As The Pink Panther and The Ant and the Aardvark entries were sourced using theatrical prints (sans laugh track), a new, less invasive laugh track being employed on sitcoms at the time was added to the soundtrack for consistency to match the made-for-television Misterjaw entries and bumper sequences that retained their respective laugh-tracked soundtracks.

Pre-1978 Pink Panther and Ant and the Aardvark entries featured shorter opening titles with introduction music from either The New Pink Panther Show (1971–1974) or The All New Pink Panther Show (1978–1979). Closing credits featuring the Pink Panther disco dancing from The All New Pink Panther Show closed out the episodes.

==== Version 1 ====
#	The Pink Panther Entry 1	The Inspector and The Ant and the Aardvark	The Pink Panther Entry 2
01	Pink Plasma	Sicque! Sicque! Sicque!	Pink Pest Control
02	A Fly in the Pink	Don't Hustle an Ant With Muscle	Pink-A-Rella
03	Psst Pink	Cirrhosis of the Louvre	Pink Aye
04	Psychedelic Pink	I've Got Ants in My Plans	Pink-In
05	Rock a Bye Pinky	Le Pig-Al Patrol	Tickled Pink
06	The Pink Quarterback	Reaux, Reaux, Reaux Your Boat	The Hand is Pinker Than the Eye
07	Pinto Pink	The Pique Poquette of Paris	Come On In! The Water's Pink
08	Pink Pranks	Scratch a Tiger	Pink Outs
09	Trail of the Lonesome Pink	Ape Suzette	Gong With the Pink
10	Lucky Pink	Technology Phooey	Pink DaVinci
11	In the Pink of the Night	Never Bug an Ant	Pink Streaker
12	Prefabricated Pink	Cock-a-Doodle Deux Deux	The Pink Phink

==== Version 2 ====
#	The Pink Panther Entry 1	Misterjaw and The Ant and the Aardvark	The Pink Panther Entry 2
01	Pinkcome Tax	Little Red Riding Halibut	Pink Blue Plate
02	Pink Paradise	Dune Bug	Pink of the Litter
03	Pink on the Cob	The $6.95 Bionic Shark	The Pink Pro
04	Rocky Pink	Moulin Rouges	Think Before You Pink
05	Genie With the Light Pink Fur	Shopping Spree	Forty Pink Winks
06	We Give Pink Stamps	Showbiz Shark	Pinknic
07	Sherlock Pink	To Catch a Halibut	Pink, Plunk, Plink
08	Pink Campaign	The Codfather	Pinkadilly Circus
09	Pink Panic	The Ant From Uncle	Twinkle Twinkle Little Pink

=== Spanish versions ===
Other versions of The Pink Panther Show have been seen and aired only in Spanish.

#	The Pink Panther Entry 1	Hoot Kloot	The Pink Panther Entry 2
01	Pinky Doodle	Apache on the County Seat	Pink Pajamas
02	Pink 8 Ball	Pay Your Buffalo Bill	The Pink Pro
03	Bobolink Pink	The Badge and the Beautiful	Dial "P" for Pink
04	Salmon Pink	Ten Miles to the Gallop	Pink Streaker
05	Rocky Pink	As the Tumbleweed Turns	Pickled Pink
06	Mystic Pink	By Hoot or by Crook	Pink Panzer
07	Trail of the Lonesome Pink	Strange on the Range	Pink Aye
08	The Scarlet Pinkernel	A Self-Winding Sidewinde	Vitamin Pink
09	The Pink of Arabee	Stirrups and Hiccups	Rock A Bye Pinky
10	Pink Campaign	Phony Express	The Hand Is Pinker Than the Eye
11	Sherlock Pink	Kloot's Kounty (pilot)	G.I Pink
12	Pink Piper	Giddy Up Woe	Twinkle, Twinkle, Little Pink
13	Pink DaVinci	The Shoe Must Go On	Forty Pink Winks
14	Therapeutic Pink	Mesa Trouble	Pink in the Clink
15	Pink Elephant	Big Beef at the O.K. Corral	Pink Sphinx
16	Pink Plasma	Gold Struck	Pink Pest Control
17	It's Pink But Is It Mink?	Saddle Soap Opera	Extinct Pink

== German version ==
German title card.

The German version of the show, Der rosarote Panther – Zu Gast bei Paulchens Trickverwandten (The Pink Panther – Being a Guest of Paulie's Cartoon-relatives) which started airing on ZDF in 1973 contains four cartoons per episode. The first cartoon is always a Pink Panther entry, the second one is an Inspector short, followed by another Pink Panther cartoon, and usually ending with an Ant and the Aardvark short. However, cartoons from The Gerald McBoing-Boing Show by UPA are added into the mix starting with episode 12, making the show's format rather messy compared to its other incarnations. Several episodes start off with a Pink Panther cartoon, followed by a longer UPA cartoon, and end with another Pink Panther short. Others replace the second Pink Panther entry with a UPA cartoon, and some feature two or three UPA cartoons cut together as one 'proper' segment. Bumpers are featured in this series, but only in the first 42 episodes. All cartoons have their opening and ending titles removed; when a cartoon ends, it immediately fades into a bumper and once the bumper ends, the next cartoon starts playing with no title card or credits.

When The All New Pink Panther Show was acquired by ZDF in 1980, they edited it to fit this format as well. Some episodes start out with one Pink Panther short, followed by a Crazylegs Crane cartoon, a second Pink Panther short, and ending with another Crazylegs Crane cartoon. Others start with two Pink Panther cartoons, followed by a Crazylegs Crane entry, and ending with a third Pink Panther short. The cartoons Yankee Doodle Pink, Pet Pink Pebbles, and The Pink of Bagdad are skipped due to being reissues of previous shorts.

This incarnation of the show contains no laugh track on any of the series featured. The Pink Panther is given a name, Paulchen Panther (Paul or Little Paul the Panther), and the cartoons featuring him are given narration written by Eberhard Storeck and spoken by voice actor Gert Günther Hoffmann. A new intro and outro theme, Wer hat an der Uhr gedreht?, was composed by Fred Strittmatter and Quirin Amper Jr., with new one-minute-long intro and outro sequences being cut together from existing pieces of animation.

While most episodes are 24 or 25 minutes in length, the ones that premiered on ZDF in 1978 feature only two Pink Panther cartoons with the intro and outro sequences being only 20 seconds long each, making them only 11 minutes long. Three 23-minute-long specials, A Pink Christmas, Olym-Pinks, and Pink at First Sight were also aired under this show.

On Amazon Prime, the Gerald McBoing-Boing segments were excluded due to copyright issues with NBCUniversal.

- The Pink Panther
- The Inspector
- The Ant and the Aardvark
- The Gerald McBoing-Boing Show
- Crazylegs Crane

#	Cartoons								Air date
01	Prefabricated Pink	Le Bowser Bagger		Sky Blue Pink		The Ant from Uncle			October 1, 1973
02	The Pink Blueprint	Bomb Voyage		The Pink Tail Fly		Technology, Phooey			October 8, 1973
03	The Pink Pill	Plastered in Paris		Pink Pistons		Ants in the Pantry			October 15, 1973
04	Jet Pink	The Pique Poquette of Paris		Tickled Pink		Le Escape Goat			October 22, 1973
05	Pinto Pink	Le Pig-Al Patrol		In the Pink		Isle of Caprice			October 29, 1973
06	Rock-A-Bye Pinky	Toulouse La Trick		Sink Pink		Rough Brunch			November 5, 1973
07	Prehistoric Pink	Reaux, Reaux, Reaux Your Boat		Come On In! The Water's Pink		Scratch a Tiger			November 12, 1973
08	Pink Pest Control	Tour de Farce		Pink-A-Boo		Canadian Can-Can			November 19, 1973
09	Pink Panic	Transylvania Mania		An Ounce of Pink		Science Friction			November 26, 1973
10	Dial "P" for Pink	Napoleon Blown-Aparte		Bully for Pink		London Derriere			December 3, 1973
11	Pink Sphinx	Cock-A-Doodle Deux Deux		The Pink Phink		The Froze Nose Knows			December 10, 1973
12	Pink Punch	Unsafe and Seine		The Twelve Days of Christmas		Mumbo Jumbo			December 17, 1973
13	Pink of the Litter	The Great De Gaulle Stone Operation		Shocking Pink		Dune Bug			December 31, 1973
14	Extinct Pink	Le Great Dane Robbery		Turned Around Clown		La Feet's Defeat			January 7, 1974
15	Little Beaux Pink	Bear De Guerre		The Sad Lion		Crow De Guerre			January 14, 1974
16	Reel Pink	Les Miserobots		Smile Pretty, Say Pink		Don't Hustle an Ant With Muscle			January 21, 1974
17	Pickled Pink	Ape Suzette		The Lost Duchess		Le Ball and Chain Gang			January 28, 1974
18	Pink, Plunk, Plink	That's No Lady — That's Notre Dame!		The Five Cent Nickel		Le Cop on Le Rocks			February 4, 1974
19	Put-Put, Pink	French Freud		The Magic Fiddle		Never Bug an Ant			February 11, 1974
20	Super Pink	The Invisible Moustache of Raoul Dufy				Twinkle, Twinkle, Little Pink			February 18, 1974
21	Pink Panzer	The Fifty-First Dragon				Pink on the Cob			February 25, 1974
22	Genie With the Light Pink Fur	Cherche Le Phantom		Lion on the Loose		The Ant and the Aardvark			March 4, 1974
23	Psychedelic Pink	The Merry-Go-Round in the Jungle				Pink Posies			March 11, 1974
24	Slink Pink	Nero Fiddles				Pink-A-Rella			March 18, 1974
25	G.I. Pink	Carte Blanched		The Bear Scare		Hasty But Tasty			March 25, 1974
26	In the Pink of the Night	The Trial of Zelda Belle				Think Before You Pink			April 1, 1974
27	Lucky Pink	The Shooting of Caribou Lou		The Elephant Mystery		I've Got Ants in My Plans			April 8, 1974
28	Psst Pink	The King and Joe				Gong With the Pink			April 22, 1974
29	Pink Ice	The Beanstalk Trial				Pinkfinger			April 29, 1974
30	Pinkcome Tax	Pierre and Cottage Cheese		The Last Doubloon		Odd Ant Out			May 6, 1974
31	Pink in the Clink	The Matador and the Troubadour		The Pink Package Plot		Uncle Sneaky			May 13, 1974
32	Vitamin Pink	The Day of the Fox		A Fly in the Pink		Marvo the Magician			May 20, 1974
33	Pink Pajamas	Sicque! Sicque! Sicque!		Colonel Puffington and Mr. Finch		From Bed to Worse			May 27, 1974
34	Pink Pranks	Mr. Charmley in the Jungle		The Pink Flea		Trap Happy			June 10, 1974
35	Pink Is a Many Splintered Thing	Persistent Mr. Fulton		The Pink Quarterback		The Quadrangle			June 17, 1974
36	Pinknic	The Freeze Yum Story		Pinkadilly Circus		Outlaws			June 24, 1974
37	Pink Tuba-Dore	Trojan Horse				Pink Blue Plate			July 1, 1974
38	The Hand Is Pinker Than the Eye	The Armored Car		Congratulations It's Pink		Old MacDonald	The Haunted Night	I Had a Bird	July 8, 1974
39	Pink Paradise	Sacré Bleu Cross		The Unenchanted Princess	The Two Musicians	Isle of Caprice			July 15, 1974
40	Pink Valiant	Rough Brunch		Le Quiet Squad		Operation Heart Throb			July 22, 1974
41	We Give Pink Stamps	The Genius - Time Machine		Cirrhosis of the Louvre		Scratch a Tiger			July 29, 1974
42	Pink-In	Alphabet Song	The Ballet Lesson	Pink Outs		Average Giraffe		The Violin Recital	August 5, 1974
43	Therapeutic Pink			The Pink of Arabee					c. 1978
44	Rocky Pink			Trail of the Lonesome Pink					c. 1978
45	Salmon Pink			Forty Pink Winks					c. 1978
46	Keep Our Forests' Pink			Pink Piper					c. 1978
47	Mystic Pink			Pink Plasma					c. 1978
48	Bobolink Pink			Pink Streaker					c. 1978
49	Sherlock Pink			It's Pink, But Is It Mink?					c. 1978
50	Pink Campaign			Pink Elephant					c. 1978
51	The Pink Pro			The Scarlet Pinkernel					c. 1978
52	Pink Aye			Pink 8 Ball					c. 1978
53	Pinky Doodle			Pink DaVinci					c. 1978
54	Pink Bananas	Pinktails for Two		Life With Feather		Pink Arcade			August 19, 1980
55	Pink S.W.A.T.	Pink Suds		Crane Brained		Pink Pull			August 26, 1980
56	Sprinkle Me Pink	Pink Daddy		Sneaker Snack		Cat and the Pinkstalk			September 2, 1980
57	Spark Plug Pink	Pink Breakfast		Sonic Broom		Pink Lightning			September 9, 1980
58	Pink in the Drink	Doctor Pink		Storky and Hatch		Pink Pictures			September 16, 1980
59	Supermarket Pink	Bug Off		String Along in Pink		Animal Crack-ups			September 23, 1980
60	Pink Lemonade	Pink Trumpet		Fly by Knight		Dietetic Pink			September 30, 1980
61	Toro Pink	King of the Swamp		Pink in the Woods		Winter Blunderland			Unknown
62	Pink Quackers	Barnacle Bird		Pink and Shovel		Jet Feathers			December 9, 1980
63	The Pink Panther in: A Pink Christmas								December 16, 1980
64	Pinkologist	Pink Press		Nest Quest		Pink U.F.O.			January 13, 1981
65	Pink Z-Z-Z	Flower Power		Star Pink		Trail of the Lonesome Mine			January 20, 1981
66	The Pink Panther in: Olym-Pinks								January 27, 1981
67	The Pink Panther in: Pink at First Sight								February 1, 1983

== See also ==
- List of The Pink Panther cartoons
- Laugh track
- The Pink Panther in: A Pink Christmas
- The Pink Panther in: Olym-Pinks
- The Pink Panther in: Pink at First Sight
