= DePatie–Freleng Enterprises =

Defunct American animation studio

DePatie–Freleng Enterprises, Inc.
- Type: Private
- Industry: Animation
- Predecessor: Warner Bros. Cartoons
- Founded: May 1963; 63 years ago
- Founders: David H. DePatie; Friz Freleng
- Defunct: 1980; 46 years ago
- Fate: Acquired and renamed by Marvel to Marvel Productions
- Successors: Studio: Marvel Productions (later New World Animation); Library: The Walt Disney Company (via. BVS Entertainment; majority of TV productions not co-produced with Mirisch); Skydance Corporation (via. Warner Bros. Animation; Looney Tunes commissioned works); Amazon MGM Studios (via United Artists; theatrical shorts and Mirisch co-produced TV series); Universal Television (Dennis the Menace in Mayday for Mother only); Dr. Seuss Enterprises (Dr. Seuss specials)
- Headquarters: Burbank, California, United States
- Products: Television shows Theatrical shorts Television specials Title sequences Television commercials
- Owners: David H. DePatie; Friz Freleng

DePatie–Freleng Enterprises, Inc. (Note: /dəˈpæti ˈfriːləŋ/) (also known as Mirisch-Geoffrey-DePatie-Freleng Productions when involved with the Mirisch brothers and Geoffrey Productions, and DFE Films) was an American animation studio founded by former Warner Bros. Cartoons employees David H. DePatie and Friz Freleng in May 1963, before being acquired by Marvel in 1980 and renamed Marvel Productions. Based in Burbank, California, DFE produced animation for film and television.

Notable among the productions that the studio produced are the opening titles for The Pink Panther (1963), its first, second, and fifth sequels, and an associated series of animated theatrical shorts featuring the Pink Panther character, as well as entries in the Looney Tunes and Merrie Melodies series from 1964 to 1967, the Dr. Seuss television specials from 1971 to 1982, the lightsaber effects in the original Star Wars (1977), and the Bod Squad and Time for Timer series of public service announcements for ABC in the mid-1970s.

== History ==
=== Origins ===
DFE was formed by two former employees at Warner Bros. Cartoons, director/composer/producer Friz Freleng and executive David H. DePatie, after Warner Bros. Pictures closed its animation studio in May 1963. Although Freleng and DePatie were no longer working for Warner Bros., a generous gesture from a Warner executive allowed Freleng and DePatie to lease the former Warner cartoons studio on California Street in Burbank, complete with equipment and supplies for a low rent each year. Although DFE's initial business was in commercials and industrial films, several lucky breaks put the new studio into the theatrical cartoon business.

Director Blake Edwards contacted DFE and asked them to design a panther character for Edwards's new film, The Pink Panther. Pleased with Hawley Pratt’s design for the character, Edwards contracted with DFE to produce the animated titles for the film. Upon the film's release, the titles garnered a tremendous amount of attention, so much that a large amount of the picture's gross is believed to have been generated by the success of DFE's title sequence.

DFE then signed with United Artists to produce a series of animated short subjects featuring the Pink Panther, which included over 100 shorts for both theatrical and television audiences through 1980. Also in 1964, DePatie and Freleng's longtime employer, Warner Bros., contracted with DFE to produce additional new Looney Tunes and Merrie Melodies cartoon shorts for theatrical release.

DePatie and Freleng soon found themselves overflowing with work. Many of the animators who had worked at Warner Bros. during the 1950s and 1960s returned to the old Warner cartoon studio to work for DFE. The first entry in the Pink Panther series, The Pink Phink, was directed by Freleng and won the studio its only Academy Award in 1964. In 1966, DFE would receive an Academy Award nomination for The Pink Blueprint.

=== The Pink Panther Show and others ===
The Pink Panther theatrical animated shorts became the basis of a Saturday-morning cartoon, The Pink Panther Show, on September 6, 1969; the show also included theatrical animated shorts of The Inspector (introduced in 1966) and eventually The Ant and the Aardvark, Roland and Rattfink (introduced in 1968), and The Texas Toads (Tijuana Toads). Like most animated television cartoons at the time, The Pink Panther Show contained a laugh track with narration. The cartoons were edited and in some cases re-dubbed to meet television standards and practices for content.

The Pink Panther Show had several incarnations during the 1970s. The show was popular on NBC's Saturday morning line-up, starting as a half-hour program and expanding a few years later to 90 minutes each week. The studio provided the animated sequences for the 1969–1970 television series My World and Welcome to It, based on the drawings of James Thurber. DFE was one of the subcontractors for the 1964–1967 Warner Bros. cartoons, along with Format Productions.

The Looney Tunes/Merrie Melodies shorts made by the studio can be easily identified by their modernized "Abstract WB" opening and closing sequences (although the "Abstract WB" opening and closing sequences were first used in three cartoons made by Warner Bros. Cartoons). However, select 1964–1967 DePatie–Freleng Looney Tunes and Merrie Melodies were panned by fans and critics alike, with some of the harshest judgements made against cartoons directed by Rudy Larriva. The contract would eventually expire in May 1966 afterwards to set up a new version of the cartoon studio for Warner Bros. by William L. Hendricks. After early 1967, DFE did not continue doing Warner cartoon work until the late 1970s/early 1980s, with the television specials Bugs Bunny's Easter Special (1977), Bugs Bunny's Looney Christmas Tales (1979), and Daffy Duck's Easter Egg-Citement (1980).

DFE also produced Return to the Planet of the Apes, which ran on NBC from September 6 to November 29, 1975, and The Oddball Couple, which ran on Saturday mornings on ABC from September 6 to December 20, 1975. One of the studio's television specials was The Bear Who Slept Through Christmas (1973), with Tommy Smothers voicing the little bear who goes out to find Christmas (in the human world) while his fellow bears head for hibernation. DFE was also responsible for a number of Dr. Seuss specials, including The Cat in the Hat and different incarnations of the Grinch.

=== Sale to Marvel and post-history ===
On February 6, 1980, DePatie–Freleng Enterprises went out of business and its assets were liquidated. Later, on June 19, 1980, Freleng and DePatie sold DFE Films to Marvel Comics, and Freleng returned to Warner Bros. Animation, which Warner Bros. had re-opened in March of that year, to produce a series of feature films featuring vintage Warner cartoons with new connecting footage. DePatie made the transition to become the head of Marvel Productions, the newly renamed DFE. In March 1982, DePatie announced that the company had started producing animated programs. The DePatie-Freleng name was later revived in name only in 1984 for Pink Panther and Sons, which was otherwise entirely produced by Hanna-Barbera Productions.

Although Marvel produced mainly superhero cartoons and animated series based on licensed toy lines (including Hasbro properties), it continued to produce new productions starring the Pink Panther (a special for television Pink at First Sight and motion picture titles for Trail of the Pink Panther and Curse of the Pink Panther). Metro-Goldwyn-Mayer Animation would later revive The Pink Panther TV series in 1993 as a joint venture between MGM, Mirisch-Geoffrey-DePatie-Freleng and United Artists, a decade after DFE's merger with Marvel and Mirisch/UA's merger into MGM.

In 1993, Marvel Productions was renamed to New World Animation; after News Corporation purchased New World Entertainment in 1996, New World Animation was absorbed into Saban Entertainment, ending the life of the studio that once was DFE. Marvel would continue to produce animated shows through a partnership with Saban, which had recently acquired a 50% stake in Fox Kids. In 2001, The Walt Disney Company acquired Saban as part of its purchase of Fox Family Worldwide.

== Ownership ==
In 2009, The Walt Disney Company purchased Marvel Entertainment, putting DFE's original and Marvel Comics-based programs under the ownership of the same corporation; all of the associated shows are now distributed by Disney–ABC Domestic Television. The Dr. Seuss specials animated by DFE are owned by Dr. Seuss Enterprises, with home media distribution rights currently licensed to Warner Bros. Home Entertainment. The few series that DFE co-produced with The Mirisch Company are currently owned by Amazon MGM Studios.

While the television catalog has often changed hands over the years, the theatrical cartoons continue to be owned by their original distributors: United Artists (via its current corporate parent, Amazon MGM Studios) for The Mirisch Company cartoon library, and Warner Bros. for the Looney Tunes/Merrie Melodies cartoons.

== Former Warner Bros. Cartoons employees at DePatie–Freleng ==
In the beginning, DePatie–Freleng had virtually the same facilities, personnel and producer as the former Warner Bros. Cartoons. Although Chuck Jones later worked with DePatie–Freleng on The Cat in the Hat, Jones and most of his group of artists ended up at Sib Tower 12 Productions. Jones independently produced new Tom and Jerry cartoons for MGM.

Although many DePatie–Freleng employees contributed greatly to the success of its product, story artist and Disney and Warner alumnus John W. Dunn created most of its cartoon series, both for theatrical release and for television. These series included The Ant and the Aardvark, Tijuana Toads, Here Comes the Grump, and Roland and Rattfink, among others.

Many of the DFE cartoons were written and storyboarded by Dunn, including the first Pink Panther cartoon, The Pink Phink. Dunn's drawing style was used in other DFE cartoons as well.

== Filmography ==
In a short time, DFE began producing television shows as well as theatricals and specials, becoming a competitor to Hanna-Barbera and Filmation. The studio's various cartoons, specials and shows are listed below.

=== Theatrical series ===
Original series

Title	Years	Notes
The Pink Panther	1964–1980	The 1978–1980 cartoons were originally broadcast on TV before they were screened in theaters.
The Inspector	1965–1969	
Roland and Rattfink	1968–1971	
The Ant and the Aardvark	1969–1971	
Tijuana Toads	1969–1972	Renamed “Texas Toads” for television in 1976.
The Blue Racer	1972–1974	
Hoot Kloot	1973–1974	
The Dogfather	1974–1976	

Commissioned series

- Looney Tunes and Merrie Melodies (for Warner Bros. Pictures, 1964–1967)

=== TV series ===
Title	Years	Network	Notes	Episodes
The Super 6	1966–1967	NBC	Co-production with Mirisch-Rich Television Productions	20
Super President	1967–1968	NBC	Co-production with Mirisch-Rich Television Productions	15
Here Comes the Grump	1969–1970	NBC	Co-production with The Mirisch Company	17
The Pink Panther Show * Misterjaw (shorts; 1976) * Crazylegs Crane (shorts; 1978)	1969–1980	NBC/ABC	Co-production with United Artists Television and Mirisch Films	190
Doctor Dolittle	1970–1971	NBC	Co-production with 20th Century-Fox Television	17
The Barkleys	1972–1973	NBC	Distributed by Viacom Enterprises	13
The Houndcats	1972–1974	NBC	Distributed by Viacom Enterprises	13
Bailey's Comets	1973–1975	CBS		16
The Oddball Couple	1975–1977	ABC	Distributed by Viacom Enterprises	16
Return to the Planet of the Apes	1975–1976	NBC	Co-production with 20th Century-Fox Television	13
Baggy Pants and the Nitwits	1977–1978	NBC		13
What's New, Mr. Magoo?	1977–1979	CBS	Co-production with United Productions of America	16
The New Fantastic Four	1978	NBC	Co-production with Marvel Comics Animation	13
Spider-Woman	1979–1980	ABC	Co-production with Marvel Comics Animation	16

Commissioned series

- Sesame Street ("The Pink Panther karate-chops a K") (for Children's Television Workshop) (1970)
- Doctor Snuggles (episodes 8–13) (for Polyscope Productions, with Topcraft) (1979)

=== TV specials ===
Air date	Title	Network	Property	Notes
March 31, 1970	Goldilocks	NBC	Bing Crosby	Live-action and animated co-production with the Sherman Brothers
March 10, 1971	The Cat in the Hat	CBS	Dr. Seuss	
February 14, 1972	The Lorax	CBS	Dr. Seuss	
November 12, 1972	Clerow Wilson and the Miracle of P.S. 14	NBC	Clerow Wilson	Starring comedian Flip Wilson; many of his characters appear in the special, including Geraldine Jones and Reverend Leroy
January 6, 1973	Luvcast U.S.A.	ABC	One-shot	Episode of The ABC Saturday Superstar Movie
February 7, 1973	The Incredible, Indelible, Magical, Physical Mystery Trip	ABC	One-shot	An ABC Afterschool Special
October 15, 1973	Dr. Seuss on the Loose	CBS	Dr. Seuss	
December 17, 1973	The Bear Who Slept Through Christmas	NBC	One-Shot	Currently owned by Lionsgate
April 3, 1974	Clerow Wilson's Great Escape	NBC	Clerow Wilson	Sequel to Clerow Wilson and the Miracle of P.S. 14
May 15, 1974	The Magical Mystery Trip Through Little Red's Head	ABC	One-Shot	An ABC Afterschool Special, also a sequel to The Incredible, Indelible, Magical, Physical Mystery Trip
February 19, 1975	The Hoober-Bloob Highway	CBS	Dr. Seuss	
December 14, 1975	The Tiny Tree	NBC	One-Shot	
February 16, 1977	My Mom's Having a Baby	ABC	One-Shot	An ABC Afterschool Special
October 29, 1977	Halloween Is Grinch Night	ABC	Dr. Seuss	
February 1, 1978	Michel's Mixed-Up Musical Bird	ABC	One-Shot	An ABC Afterschool Special
December 7, 1978	The Pink Panther in: A Pink Christmas	ABC	Pink Panther	
February 22, 1980	The Pink Panther in: Olym-Pinks	ABC	Pink Panther	
March 5, 1980	Where Do Teenagers Come From?	ABC	One-Shot	An ABC Afterschool Special
May 2, 1980	Pontoffel Pock, Where Are You?	ABC	Dr. Seuss	
May 8, 1981	Dennis the Menace in Mayday for Mother	NBC	Dennis the Menace	
May 10, 1981	The Pink Panther in: Pink at First Sight	ABC	Pink Panther	Production finished by Marvel Productions
May 20, 1982	The Grinch Grinches the Cat in the Hat	ABC	Dr. Seuss	Production finished by Marvel Productions

Commissioned specials

Air date	Title	Network	Notes
April 7, 1977	Bugs Bunny's Easter Special	CBS	for Warner Bros.
November 27, 1979	Bugs Bunny's Looney Christmas Tales	CBS	for Warner Bros.
April 1, 1980	Daffy Duck's Easter Show	NBC	for Warner Bros.

=== Commercials ===
- Apple Jacks (1965)
- Mr. Wiggle (1966)
- United Artists (1968)
- Pink Panther Flakes (1972)
- The Bod Squad (1974/1977)
- Time for Timer (1975)
- Charlie the Tuna
- Little Caesars

=== Film and television title design ===
Pink Panther series

- The Pink Panther (1963)
- A Shot in the Dark (sub-contracted to George Dunning & Associates, 1964)
- Inspector Clouseau (sub-contracted to TVC London, 1968)
- Revenge of the Pink Panther (1978)
- Trail of the Pink Panther (1982) (production finished at Marvel Productions)
- Curse of the Pink Panther (1983) (production finished at Marvel Productions)

Other films

- The Dead Ringer (1964)
- The Best Man (1964) (Special effects)
- Sex and the Single Girl (1964)
- How to Murder Your Wife (1965) (Special effects)
- Love Has Many Faces (1965)
- The Satan Bug (1965)
- the maps used in The Hallelujah Trail (1965)
- The Art of Love (1965)
- The Great Race (1965)
- Do Not Disturb (1965)
- The Trouble with Angels (1966)
- the animated films parodying the Bell Telephone films in The President's Analyst (1967)
- With Six You Get Eggroll (1968)
- Star Wars (1977) (special effects)
- Capricorn One (1978) (special effects)

Other TV series

- Rawhide (TV series, 1965) (season 8)
- The Wild Wild West (TV series, 1965–1969)
- I Dream of Jeannie (TV series, 1965–1970)
- My World and Welcome to It (TV series, 1969–1971)

== Bibliography ==
- Arnold, Mark (2015). Think Pink! The DePatie-Freleng Story. BearManor Media. ISBN 9781593931698.
- Beck, Jerry (2005). Pink Panther : the ultimate guide to the coolest cat in town. ISBN 0-7566-1033-8.
