= The Kwicky Koala Show =

Animated television series

- Genre: Comedy; Slapstick
- Created by: Tex Avery
- Written by: Bob Ogle
- Directed by: George Gordon; Carl Urbano; Rudy Zamora
- Voices of: Bob Ogle; John Stephenson; Michael Bell; Peter Cullen; Marshall Efron; Matthew Faison; Jim MacGeorge; Allan Melvin; Don Messick; Frank Welker
- Countries of origin: United States; Australia
- No. of episodes: 16 (64 segments)

Production
- Executive producers: William Hanna; Joseph Barbera
- Producer: Art Scott
- Editor: Gil Iverson
- Running time: 30 minutes
- Production companies: Hanna-Barbera Productions; Hanna Barbera Pty, Ltd.

Original release
- Network: CBS
- Release: September 12 – December 26, 1981

The Kwicky Koala Show is an animated television series produced by Hanna-Barbera Productions and Hanna Barbera Pty, Ltd. that aired on Saturday-mornings on CBS from September 12 to December 26, 1981. The show is notable for being among cartoon director Tex Avery's final works; he died during production in 1980. As it was produced in Australia, the Cartoon Network and later Boomerang broadcasts were sourced from time-compressed PAL masters, rather than NTSC masters like many other Hanna-Barbera productions. Each segment has also been shown separately as filler between shows on Boomerang.

The Kwicky Koala Show contained four short segments: Kwicky Koala, The Bungle Brothers, Crazy Claws and Dirty Dawg.

== Voice cast ==
- Michael Bell as George and Ranger Rangerfield
- Peter Cullen as Bristletooth
- Marshall Efron as Ratso
- Matthew Faison as Officer Bullhorn
- Jim MacGeorge as Crazy Claws
- Allan Melvin as Joey
- Don Messick as Rawhide Clyde
- Bob Ogle as Kwicky Koala
- John Stephenson as Wilford Wolf
- Frank Welker as Dirty Dawg

=== Additional voices ===
- Marlene Aragon
- Joe Baker
- Jered Barclay
- Hamilton Camp
- Henry Corden
- Jack DeLeon
- Joan Gerber
- Danny Goldman
- Bob Holt
- Annie Potts
- Paul Ross
- Bob Sarlatte
- Marilyn Schreffler
- Hal Smith
- Lennie Weinrib

== Segments ==
=== Kwicky Koala ===
Kwicky Koala (voiced by writer Bob Ogle) is similar to Avery's Droopy, except that Kwicky can escape his pursuer Wilford Wolf (voiced by John Stephenson), who closely resembles the earlier Hanna-Barbera character Mildew Wolf (to the point that Stephenson impersonates Mildew's voice actor Paul Lynde for Wilford). The difference is that Kwicky moves at super-speed, which looks more like vanishing into thin air with an accompanying "beep" sound effect, much like Speedy Gonzales (the animation shortcut used to facilitate this often went to extremes by making Kwicky disappear from one spot and reappear instantly in the next, with no intermediate smear frames).

==== Episodes ====
No. in season	Title	Written by	Original release date
K.1	"Sink or Swim"	Bob Ogle	September 12, 1981
K.2	"Robinson Caruso"	Chuck Couch and Lew Marshall	September 19, 1981
K.3	"In a Pig's Eye"	Tex Avery and Chuck Couch	September 26, 1981
K.4	"Robin Hoodwink"	Bob Ogle	October 3, 1981
K.5	"Kwicky Goes West"	Bob Ogle	October 10, 1981
K.6	"Collectors Item"	Larz Bourne	October 17, 1981
K.7	"The Incredible Lunk"	Steve Clark, Lane Raichert, and Don Dougherty	October 24, 1981
K.8	"Race to Riches"	Carl Fallberg, Lane Raichert, and Don Dougherty	October 31, 1981
K.9	"Kangaroo Kapers"	Carl Fallberg, Lane Raichert, and Don Dougherty	November 7, 1981
K.10	"Double Trouble"	Tom Dagenais	November 14, 1981
K.11	"Around the World in 80 Seconds"	Tex Avery, Chuck Couch, and Don Jurwich	November 21, 1981
K.12	"Kwicky's Karnival Kaper"	Bob Ogle	November 28, 1981
K.13	"Scream Test"	Carl Fallberg, Lane Raichert, and Don Dougherty	December 5, 1981
K.14	"Disguise the Limit"	Don Jurwich, Lane Raichert, and Don Dougherty	December 12, 1981
K.15	"Museum Mayhem"	Jack Hanrahan, Lane Raichert, and Don Dougherty	December 19, 1981
K.16	"Hunger Pangs and Pzings"	Dale Hale	December 26, 1981

=== The Bungle Brothers ===
A pair of beagles named George (voiced by Michael Bell) and Joey (voiced by Allan Melvin) seek vaudeville stardom. This segment is mostly short wraparounds.

==== Episodes ====
No. in season	Title	Original release date
B.1	"Hat Dance / Dry Run / Cheap Trick"	September 12, 1981
B.2	"High Rollers / Teeter Totter Act / The Circus Cannon Act"	September 19, 1981
B.3	"Trapeze Act / Saw in Two / Unicycle"	September 26, 1981
B.4	"Big Pie Jump / Honk If You Love Joey / Sound Off"	October 3, 1981
B.5	"Joey Juggling George / The Toe Dancing Beagle or Whats Nureyev / The Barrel Jump"	October 10, 1981
B.6	"Karate Chop Act / Tarzan Swing Act / The Ventriloquist"	October 17, 1981
B.7	"Rope Twirling Act / High Wire Harness / The Marionette Act"	October 24, 1981
B.8	"Cream Pie / Ballonitics / Escape Artist"	October 31, 1981
B.9	"Rock Band / Circus Car / Dueling Trombones"	November 7, 1981
B.10	"Quiz Whiz Kid / Stilts / The Romeo and Juliet Act"	November 14, 1981
B.11	"Animal Trainers / Double Jump / Pie Faced"	November 21, 1981
B.12	"The Plumbers Helper / Bungle Ballet / Hang 20"	November 28, 1981
B.13	"The Big Bang / Flipped Out / Bucking Bull"	December 5, 1981
B.14	"Hamlet Lays an Egg / The Magic Ring Act / The Fly"	December 12, 1981
B.15	"Weight Weight Lifter / Droop the Loop / Heavy Ending"	December 19, 1981
B.16	"Ice Follies / Punchy Pirates / Concert Pianist"	December 26, 1981

=== Crazy Claws ===
A wildcat named Crazy Claws (voiced by Jim MacGeorge impersonating Groucho Marx) uses his sharp wits and equally sharp claws to evade the fur trapper Rawhide Clyde (voiced by Don Messick) and his dog Bristletooth (voiced by Peter Cullen) in a U.S. National Park run by Ranger Rangerfield (voiced by Michael Bell).

==== Episodes ====
No. in season	Title	Written by	Original release date
C.1	"Crazy it's Cold Outside"	Jim Ryan	September 12, 1981
Crazy Claws stays in Clyde's shack in Winter time.
C.2	"The Claws Conspiracy"	Cliff Roberts	September 19, 1981
Clyde tries using Glue, Fleas, and Cement to trap Crazy Claws.
C.3	"Crazy Challenges"	Glenn Leopold	September 26, 1981
Clyde has Crazy Claws compete with Bristletooth, as an excuse to capture Him.
C.4	"Clyde's Birthday Surprise"	Bryce Malek	October 3, 1981
It's Rangerfield's birthday and Crazy Claws hopes to throw one for Him as Clyde intends to get Crazy Claws.
C.5	"The Ice Rage"	Coslough Johnson	October 10, 1981
While Crazy Claws and Rangerfield brings a sign on top of a snowy mountain, Clyde tries to get Crazy Claws.
C.6	"Claws Encounters of the Worst Kind"	Glenn Leopold	October 17, 1981
Crazy Claws encounters Aliens who are really Clyde and Bristletooth, but when real aliens come...
C.7	"Lookout Crazy"	Nancy Clements	October 24, 1981
While helping Rangerfield make repairs on a park tower, Crazy Claws has to avoid Clyde.
C.8	"Crazy Camping"	Glenn Leopold	October 31, 1981
Crazy Claws camps out, as Clyde intends to capture Him nearby.
C.9	"Gold Crazy"	Doug Booth	November 7, 1981
Clyde searches a mine for gold.
C.10	"See Saw Claws"	Cliff Roberts	November 14, 1981
Clyde and Bristletooth try to capture Crazy Claws in a playground.
C.11	"Choo Choo Crazy"	Cliff Roberts	November 21, 1981
Chaos ensues when Crazy Claws and Rangerfield are in a runaway miniature train.
C.12	"Bearly Asleep"	Bryce Malek	November 28, 1981
A grumpy bear who tries to hibernate stands between Clyde and Crazy Claws.
C.13	"Old Blowhard"	Nancy Clements	December 5, 1981
Clyde uses a geyser called Old Blowhard to capture Crazy Claws.
C.14	"Snow Biz"	Cliff Roberts	December 12, 1981
Clyde tries to capture Crazy Claws around the snowy forest.
C.15	"Claws Ahoy"	Cliff Roberts	December 19, 1981
Crazy Claws tags along with the ranger on a boat, who is marking the park's sights.
C.16	"Rattletrap Rawhide"	Cliff Roberts	December 26, 1981
Clyde uses an automobile in hopes of capturing Crazy Claws.

=== Dirty Dawg ===
A vagrant labrador retriever named Dirty Dawg (voiced by Frank Welker impersonating Howard Cosell) seeks to improve life for himself and his friend Ratso the Rat (voiced by Marshall Efron) while staying ahead of a police officer named Officer Bullhorn (voiced by Matthew Faison).

==== Episodes ====
No. in season	Title	Written by	Original release date
D.1	"Pigskin Pooch"	Jim Ryan	September 12, 1981
Dirty helps sneak Ratso and a few Pups to the Super Duper Bowl.
D.2	"Dirty's Debut"	Patsy Cameron	September 19, 1981
Dirty enters Ratso in a canine competition as they go up against Officer Bullhorn and his dog Fang.
D.3	"Dirty Dawg's Faux Paw"	Jim Ryan	September 26, 1981
Dirty and Ratso infiltrate a Private Party while a burglar is on the loose.
D.4	"Calling Dr. Dirty"	Len Udes Jr. and Warren T. Taylor	October 3, 1981
Dirty and Ratso infiltrate a hospital to get free food.
D.5	"Lo-Cal Pals"	Patsy Cameron	October 10, 1981
Dirty and Ratso infiltrate a building, not knowing it's a weight-loss Place!
D.6	"A Close Encounter of the Canine Kind"	Creighton Barnes and Ted Pederson	October 17, 1981
Dirty and Ratso encounter a minuscule alien.
D.7	"Pie-Eyed Pooch"	Earl Kress	October 24, 1981
Dirty hopes to acquire some pie from a fair's pie-eating contest, but how can he get any without funds?
D.8	"Dirty Money"	Earl Kress	October 31, 1981
Rasto digs up a case of money, which is targeted by two crooks.
D.9	"A Funny Thing Happened on the Way to the Zoo"	Patsy Cameron	November 7, 1981
For Ratso's Birthday, Dirty brings him to the Zoo.
D.10	"Urban Cowdawg"	Len Udes Jr. and Warren T. Taylor	November 14, 1981
Dirty and Ratso find themselves in a rodeo.
D.11	"Dirty-O and Juliet"	Patsy Cameron	November 21, 1981
Dirty falls for a regal and clean female canine.
D.12	"Sea Dawg Dirty"	Creighton Barnes and Ted Pederson	November 28, 1981
Dirty and Ratso stow away on a cruiseliner, but they didn't know Officer Bullhorn is here as well!
D.13	"Little White Lie"	Earl Kress	December 5, 1981
Dirty covers Ratso in chalk dust so that he'd trade places with a white mouse at a research laboratory.
D.14	"The Great Dirtini"	Patsy Cameron	December 12, 1981
At a hotel, Dirty and Ratso masquerade as a magician and his assistant.
D.15	"Disco Dawg"	Doug Booth	December 19, 1981
Inspired by Ratso, Dirty turns the city dump into a Disco-playing restaurant.
D.16	"Marathon Mutt"	Bryce Malek	December 26, 1981
Dirty enlists Ratso in a race, where Officer Bullhorn is the judge, for a $1,000 prize.

== Home media ==
A VHS release of the series was issued by Worldvision Home Video during the late 1980s, and several episodes were released on DVD by Warner Home Video as part of Saturday Morning Cartoons: The 1980s Collection on May 4, 2010. The episodes on this set are "Dry Run", "Robinson Caruso", "High Roller", "The Claws Conspiracy", "Hat Dance" and "Dirty's Debut".

A complete series DVD was released on October 11, 2016 through Warner Archive.

== Other appearances ==
- In the Cartoon Network bumper "Sick Days", a majority of cartoon characters call in sick to work, resulting in a programming problem due to the talent shortage. The result was CN airing a 24-hour Kwicky Koala Marathon, much to the viewers' dismay.
- Kwicky Koala makes some cameo appearances in Harvey Birdman, Attorney at Law. He appears as a tattoo in the episode "Deadomutt Part 2". He also appears in "SPF", where he, along with Dirty Dawg, appears as one of the victims of Cybersquatting, and in "The Death of Harvey" during the riots, laying in a road crater and moving his head. Additionally, Officer Bullhorn appears as a jury candidate in "Juror in Court".
- Kwicky Koala and Dirty Dawg make appearances in Jellystone! with Kwicky Koala voiced by Paul F. Tompkins and Dirty Dawg voiced by Jeff Bergman. Dirty Dawg was seen in the episode "It's a Mad Mad Mad Rat Race" where he works as a caricature artist and is an old friend of Lippy the Lion and Hardy Har Har.
