= Lenny Schultz =

American retired comedian (1933–2025)

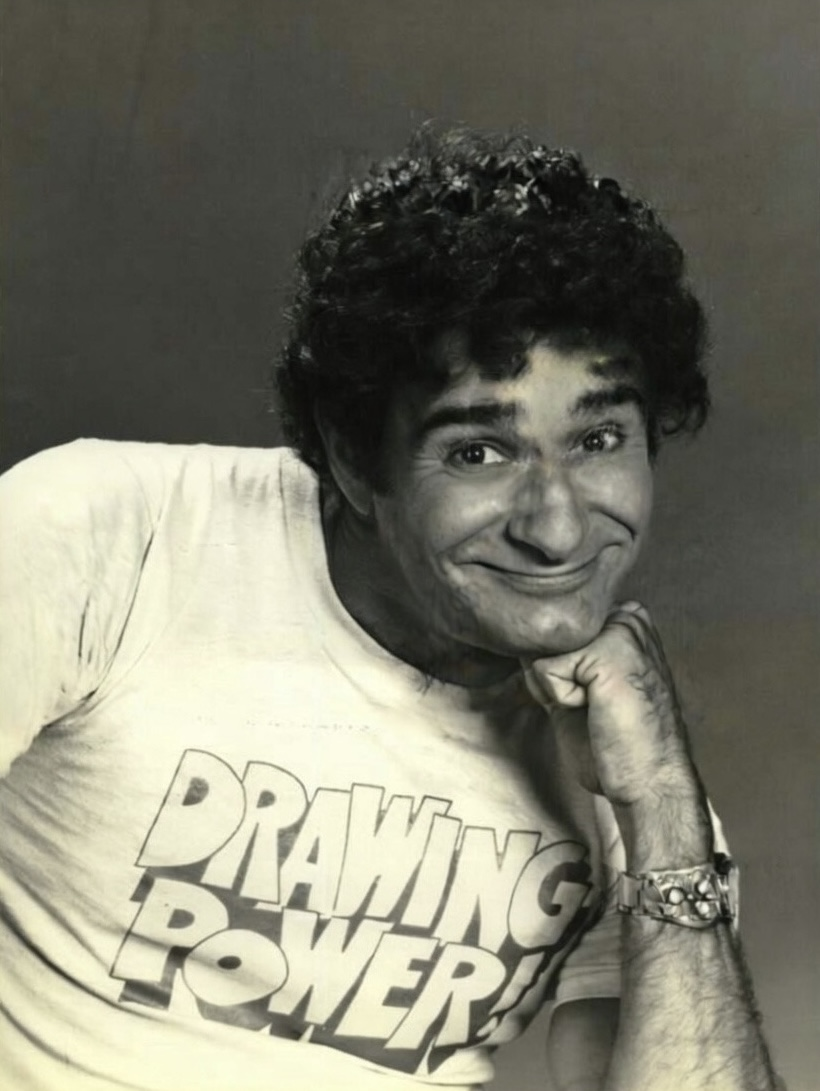
- Schultz in 1980
- Born: December 13, 1933; New York City, U.S.
- Died: March 16, 2025 (aged 91); Delray Beach, Florida, U.S.
- Education: New York University (B.S.); Hunter College (M.S.)
- Spouse: Helen Schultz (divorced 1984)
- Children: 1

Comedy career
- Years active: 1969–2025
- Medium: Stand-up, television
- Genres: Alternative comedy, improvisational comedy, prop comedy

Leonard Schultz (December 13, 1933 – March 16, 2025) was an American comedian who performed during the 1970s on television and at comedy clubs in New York City. His madcap style of improvisational comedy influenced other comedians such as Robin Williams, Gallagher, Carrot Top, and David Letterman.

== Life and career ==
Born in The Bronx, Schultz began making other children laugh at age eight by imitating chickens, making sound effects, and doing voices. Originally hoping for a career as a Major League Baseball pitcher, at 18 Schultz was offered a contract by a New York Yankee-owned minor league team. A shoulder injury compelled him to turn down the contract and ended his athletic career.

Instead he went to college, earning a Bachelor of Science degree from New York University and a Master of Science degree in education from Hunter College. After serving in the U.S. Army with the Special Services division during the Korean War, he became a high school gym teacher in 1955, teaching at such New York City schools as John Adams High School and Newtown High School. As a teacher, he was appreciated by his students and fellow teachers for his sense of humor, but ignored their encouragement to take up stand-up comedy. When friends convinced him to write a few minutes of an act, he debuted at open mic night at The Improv comedy club in New York in 1969 and quickly gained a popular following.

Four months later he appeared on The Merv Griffin Show, which led to appearances on The Tonight Show Starring Johnny Carson, The Ed Sullivan Show, and numerous other shows. By the late 1970s, he was a popular comedian both on television and at comedy clubs, particularly in the Catskill Mountains. His catch-phrase was "Go crazy, Lenny!", which he encouraged audience members to yell at him while he performed outrageous and zany antics in his act. Schultz often incorporated props in his act, with the assistance of his wife Helen (Lenny had one child with his first wife Francine Ornstein). Unlike his television act, his stand-up often included lewd or adult humor.

Throughout his comedy career he continued working as a high school gym teacher and was known to leave clubs early on school nights. Schultz said that both principals and fellow teachers would ask him for autographs after seeing him on TV the night before. Schultz was known among his fellow comedians as a "hard act to follow". Schultz's comedy style has been called influential on such comics as Gallagher, Carrot Top, and Angel Salazar, and praised by such comedians as Brett Butler and David Letterman. Jon Stewart and Billy Crystal both said that he always got a standing ovation and "always killed.".

In 1992, Schultz semi-retired and moved to Sullivan County, New York with his wife. As of 2017, he lived in Hallandale Beach, Florida.

Schultz died at home in Delray Beach, Florida, on March 15, 2025, at the age of 91.

== Television appearances ==
- The Merv Griffin Show (1969, 1972) as himself
- The David Frost Show (1969–1971) as himself
- The Tonight Show Starring Johnny Carson (1970) as himself
- The Mike Douglas Show (1970) as himself
- The Ed Sullivan Show (1971) as himself
- Fol-de-Rol (TV Movie) (1972) Jack Spratt, Jester, Ensemble
- The Dick Cavett Show (1973) as himself
- The All New Pink Panther Laugh-and-a-Half Hour-and-a-Half Show (1976) as himself
- The Late Summer Early Fall Bert Convy Show (TV Series) (1976) as himself
- Ball Four (TV Series) (1976) as Lenny "Birdman" Siegel
- The Great American Laugh-Off (1977) as himself
- Blansky's Beauties (TV Series) (1977) as himself
- Laugh-In (TV Series) (1977) as himself
- How to Watch TV (public service announcements) (1980) as Announcer
- Drawing Power (TV Series) (1980) as himself
- The Comeback Trail (theatrical film) (1982)
- Late Night with David Letterman (1982) as himself
- The House of God (theatrical film) (1984) as Zeiss
- Comedy Club (1987) as himself
- Make Me Laugh (1997) as himself
