= Crazylegs Crane =

- First appearance: Go for Croak (1969) (Tijuana Toads cartoon)
- Last appearance: Trail of the Lonesome Mine (1978) (Crazylegs Crane cartoon)
- Created by: Hawley Pratt
- Portrayed by: Larry D. Mann; Bob Holt; Daws Butler

In-universe information
- Species: Crane
- Gender: Male
- Children: Crazylegs, Jr.

Crazylegs Crane is a 16-episode made-for-television cartoon series produced by DePatie–Freleng Enterprises in 1978 for The All New Pink Panther Show on ABC.

== Production ==
This was Crazylegs Crane's first series dedicated solely to him. Previously, he had made regular appearances as an antagonist in the three DePatie-Freleng animated comedies: Tijuana Toads, The Blue Racer, and The Dogfather. Larry D. Mann voiced him in all but two of his appearances, with Bob Holt voicing him in the Tijuana Toads short "Flight to the Finish", and Daws Butler voicing him in the Dogfather short "The Goose That Laid a Golden Egg". His personality is similar to the Disney character Goofy. In the German series, this character was known as "Dummvogel", literally "stupid bird".

The character's name was never spoken in the theatrical shorts, only being referred to as a "chicken" or a "crane" by other characters. When his own series entered production he was initially called "Ichabod Crane" before settling on "Crazylegs Crane".

== Plot ==
In the cartoons that star Crazylegs Crane (voiced by Larry D. Mann), he goes through various misadventures, often accompanied by his son Crazylegs Crane Jr. (voiced by Frank Welker). He often encounters his frenemy, a fire-breathing dragonfly (voiced by Frank Welker impersonating Andy Kaufman).

== Appearances ==
None of the Crazylegs Crane shorts contained any credit information; only the series title and episode title were shown.

=== Tijuana Toads ===
1. Go For Croak: First appearance (1969)
2. Snake in the Gracias (1971)
3. Two Jumps and a Chump (1971)
4. The Egg and Ay Yi Yi! (1971)
5. A Leap in the Deep (1971)
6. Flight to the Finish (1972)

=== The Blue Racer ===
1. Blue Aces Wild (1973)
2. Snake Preview (1973)
3. Aches and Snakes (1973)

=== The Dogfather ===
1. The Goose That Laid a Golden Egg (1974)
2. Mother Dogfather (1974)

=== Crazylegs Crane ===
1. Life With Feather
2. Crane Brained
3. King of the Swamp
4. Sonic Broom
5. Winter Blunderland
6. Storky and Hatch
7. Fly by Knight
8. Sneaker Snack
9. Barnacle Bird
10. Animal Crack-ups
11. Jet Feathers
12. Nest Quest
13. Bug Off
14. Beach Bummer
15. Flower Power
16. Trail of the Lonesome Mine

== Reruns ==
Crazylegs Crane previously aired as part of The All-New Pink Panther Show on This TV on Tuesdays and Thursdays at 8:30 am Eastern Time until September 22, 2011. Also, most of the shorts often aired as filler material on Boomerang. Some episodes have also appeared on YouTube, Hulu and other online video sites.

== Home video ==
A DVD and Blu-ray containing the 16 episodes were released on April 26, 2016 from Kino Lorber.
