= The Bear Who Slept Through Christmas =

- Genre: Comedy; Adventure; Musical
- Written by: John Barrett; Larry Spiegel
- Directed by: Gerry Chiniquy; Hawley Pratt
- Voices of: Bob Holt; Kelly Lange; Michael Bell; Casey Kasem; Caryn Paperny; Arte Johnson; Tom Smothers; Barbara Feldon
- Composer: Doug Goodwin
- Country of origin: United States

Production
- Executive producers: David H. DePatie; Friz Freleng
- Producer: Theodore Geisel
- Running time: 26 minutes
- Production company: DePatie–Freleng Enterprises

Original release
- Network: NBC
- Release: December 17, 1973

The Bear Who Slept Through Christmas is an animated Christmas television special originally broadcast in the United States on NBC, December 17, 1973. The special was produced by DePatie-Freleng Enterprises, executive produced by Norman Sedawie, and starred the voices of Tom Smothers, Arte Johnson and Barbara Feldon, with narration by Casey Kasem.

The story focuses on Theodore Edward Bear (Ted E. Bear for short) who is curious about Christmas and decides to go searching for it while the other bears hibernate for the winter.

In the early 1980s, a plush Ted E. Bear was sold in stores. A Halloween sequel, The Great Bear Scare, premiered in October 1983 and was later broadcast on the Disney Channel until the late 1990s.

Rights to The Bear Who Slept Through Christmas are now owned by Lionsgate and is currently available through the Lionsgate channel on YouTube and on Tubi.

== Cast ==
- Robert Holt as Santa Claus and C. Emory Bear
- Kelly Lange as Weather Bear
- Michael Bell as Honey Bear
- Casey Kasem as the Narrator
- Caryn Paperny as Girl
- Arte Johnson as Professor Werner von Bear
- Tom Smothers as Ted E. Bear
- Barbara Feldon as Patti Bear

== Broadcast ==
The special was broadcast in the United States on NBC on December 17, 1973. The series was rebroadcast on NBC in December 1974, 1977, 1978, and 1980 as well as being broadcast once on CBS on December 15, 1979.

== Home media ==
The Bear Who Slept Through Christmas was released on VHS by Family Home Entertainment. The special can be streamed via the digital platform through various providers.

== Follow-up ==
A sequel special themed around Halloween titled The Great Bear Scare following Ted E. Bear facing off against hoards of monsters terrorizing his hometown was released for broadcast syndication in October 1982. Unlike its predecessor, The Great Bear Scare was not produced by DePatie–Freleng Enterprises, and was instead produced by Dimenmark Film Productions.

== See also ==
- List of Christmas films
- Santa Claus in film
