= Tijuana Toads =

Film series

- Title card
- Genre: Comedy
- Created by: John W. Dunn
- Composers: John Bradford; Dean Elliot
- Country of origin: United States
- Original language: English
- No. of episodes: 17

Production
- Producers: David H. DePatie; Friz Freleng
- Running time: 6–7 minutes
- Production company: DePatie–Freleng Enterprises

Original release
- Release: August 6, 1969 – April 30, 1972

Tijuana Toads is a series of 17 American theatrical cartoons produced by DePatie–Freleng and released through United Artists.

== Plot ==
The series concerns two marine toads, El Toro and the more slender Pancho, who live in the Mexican city of Tijuana. Throughout the cartoon they try to eat their prey, but always get outsmarted. They would sometimes themselves be targeted by a bird, Crazylegs Crane, and would in turn always outsmart him.

The series introduced two characters who later got their own series. The Blue Racer first appeared in "Snake in the Gracias" (1971) before getting his own series in 1972. Crazylegs Crane first appeared in "Go for Croack" (1969), and also spun off to his own series for television in 1978 on ABC. Both characters were voiced by Larry D. Mann, except in "Flight to the Finish" where Bob Holt voiced Crazylegs Crane.

El Toro was voiced by actor Don Diamond and Pancho voiced by Tom Holland. Crazylegs Crane was voiced by Larry D. Mann. Directorial duties were split between Hawley Pratt, Art Davis, Grant Simmons, and Gerry Chiniquy.

When the series began airing in 1976 as part of The Pink Panther Laugh and a Half Hour and a Half Show, it was re-dubbed and renamed Texas Toads to make the series less offensive. A laugh track was added to the new soundtrack, and the toads were given the new names of Fatso and Banjo. Producer David H. DePatie later commented on the process:

"When they (Tijuana Toads) went on television, we had to completely change them around and the series became known as the Texas Toads, and we had to redo all of the tracks that had any type of ethnic content and it really watered down the series. We all thought it was a hell of a lot more funny when it was the Tijuana Toads, but at the time we had to do it in order to bring the thing on television".

== Filmography ==
No.	Title	Directed by	Written by	Original release date
1	Tijuana Toads (TV title: "Tall in the Grass")	Hawley Pratt	John W. Dunn	August 6, 1969
Toro tries to catch a grasshopper, and will not let Pancho help him.
2	A Pair of Greenbacks	Art Davis	John W. Dunn	December 16, 1969
Toro and Pancho fight over a cockroach.
3	Go for Croak	Hawley Pratt	John W. Dunn	December 25, 1969
Crazylegs Crane tries to catch Toro and Pancho. Note: First appearance of Crazylegs Crane.
4	The Froggy Froggy Duo	Hawley Pratt	John W. Dunn	March 15, 1970
Toro and Pancho hang out in Acapulco, but a nearby hotel cook is assigned with getting frog legs for the French ambassador, so he goes after Toro and Pancho, but keeps crossing paths with a tough outlaw named El Pumo.
5	Hop and Chop	Grant Simmons	Dale Hale	June 17, 1970
Toro and Pancho try to catch the Japenese Beetle. Note: Only Tijuna Toads cartoon directed by Grant Simmons, the only other Depatie-Freleng cartoon he directed being "The Foul Kin" (Roland and Rattfink); first appearance of the Japanese Beetle.
6	Never on Thirsty	Hawley Pratt	John W. Dunn	August 5, 1970
Toro and Pancho are thirsty and spot a pool, but they must get past the guard dog to reach it.
7	A Dopey Hacienda	Hawley Pratt	John W. Dunn	December 6, 1970
A cat tries to catch Toro and Pancho.
8	Snake in the Gracias	Hawley Pratt	John W. Dunn	January 24, 1971
Crazylegs Crane gets amnesia while trying to catch Toro and Pancho, who inadvertely make him think he is a frog too. Meanwhile, the Blue Racer starts trying to catch Toro and Pancho, but Crazylegs thwarts him. Note: First appearance of the Blue Racer.
9	Two Jumps and a Chump	Gerry Chiniquy	John W. Dunn	March 28, 1971
Crazylegs Crane tries to catch Toro and Pancho again, but the duo quickly escape. When Pancho mistakes his reflection for another frog, so Toro comes over to fight it, but before he can do anything, Crazylegs returns, and the chase continues.
10	Mud Squad	Art Davis	John W. Dunn	April 28, 1971
Toro and Pancho are hungry, so they steal an egg, but it hatches and out comes a baby alligator which starts biting Toro.
11	The Egg and Ay-Yi-Yi!	Gerry Chiniquy	Dale Hale	June 6, 1971
Toro and Pancho spot an egg and decide to take care of it, and it soon hatches and out comes a baby Crazylegs Crane, and Toro and Pancho have to repeatedly feed him fruit. It's not long until Crazylegs has grown up, and (not knowing Toro and Pancho are frogs) asks to change his menu to frogs, forcing Toro and Pancho to doublecross him.
12	Fastest Tongue in the West	Gerry Chiniquy	Larz Bourne	June 20, 1971
Toro and Pancho come across a tough frog that is an outlaw, and Toro and the outlaw fight over who has the fastest tongue.
13	A Leap in the Deep	Hawley Pratt	John W. Dunn	June 20, 1971
A frog that is bigger than Toro join Toro and Pancho's swamp, forcing them out. Believing the ocean is a big swamp, Toro and Pancho decide to live at it, but Crazylegs Crane lives there and tries to catch them again.
14	Croakus Pocus	Art Davis	John W. Dunn	December 26, 1971
A Witch tries to catch Toro and Pancho.
15	Serape Happy	Gerry Chiniquy	John W. Dunn	December 26, 1971
Toro and Pancho try to catch a grasshopper.
16	Frog Jog	Gerry Chiniquy	John W. Dunn	April 23, 1972
With the help of Pancho, Toro starts working out so he can lose weight and regain his girlfriend's affection.
17	Flight to the Finish	Art Davis	John W. Dunn	April 30, 1972
Crazylegs Crane tries to catch Toro and Pancho again. The toads have eventually hid in an old shack, and Crazylegs tries to get in via disguises, but Toro and Pancho don't fall for them.

== Note ==
Tijuana Toads shorts aired on Cartoon Network and Boomerang MGM Family Channel (Italy) Mediaset Rai LA7 Dubbed International Italian Dubbed 2th (Nino Prester And Vittorio Stagni) .

== Remade and reused scenes and plots ==
- Tijuana Toads (first Episode, a.k.a. Tall in the Grass) reused scenes based from Tree for Two, Dr. Jerkyll's Hyde, and Two Crows from Tacos.
- A Pair of Greenbacks reused some scenes based on Mouse and Garden and Two Crows from Tacos.
- Go for Croak reused the drinking of nitroglycerin trick from Mouse Mazurka.
- Never on Thirsty reused scenes from The Honey-mousers.

== Revivals ==
The characters were resurrected for the 1993 TV series The Pink Panther. As the case when the original shorts were shown on TV, they were rebranded as the Texas Toads. The toads were redesigned as western sheriffs with oversized cowboy hats replacing their sombreros.

== Home video ==
=== VHS ===
In 1987, Go for Croak was released on VHS as part of Cartoon Festival.

=== DVD and Blu-ray ===
In 2016, Kino Lorber released the complete series with the original soundtrack, digitally remastered from the original negatives and in the original ratio.

== Popular culture ==
A restaurant dubbed under the name Pancho i Toro - Pizza & Grill Sesvete is located in Sesvete, Croatia.
