= Dennis the Menace in Mayday for Mother =

1981 animated television special

Dennis the Menace in Mayday for Mother is a 1981 animated television special based on Hank Ketcham's 1951 comic strip of the same name. Produced by DePatie–Freleng Enterprises, the special first aired May 8, 1981 on NBC. This was the first time Dennis the Menace was animated. The storyline was written by Ketcham.

== Plot ==
In the special, it's Mother's Day and Dennis has not decided what to give his mother for a gift.

== Voice Talents of ==
- Nicole Eggert - Margaret Wade
- Kathy Garver - Alice Mitchell
- James Hackett - Additional Voices
- Bob Holt - Henry Mitchell
- Elizabeth Kerr - Martha Wilson
- Larry D. Mann - George Wilson
- Joey Nagy - Dennis Mitchell
- Herbert Rudley - Additional Voices
- Seth Wagerman - Additional Voices
- Nancy Wible - Additional Voices

== Credits ==
- Created and written for television by Hank Ketcham
- Produced by David H. DePatie and Friz Freleng
- Directors: Bob Richardson, David Detiege, Cullen Houghtaling, Art Leonardi, Nelson Shin, Art Vitello
- Layout: Ric Gonzalez, Martin Strudler
- Animation by: Dong Seo Animation
- Voices of: Nicole Eggert, Kathy Garver, James Hackett, Bob Holt, Elizabeth Kerr, Larry D. Mann, Joey Nagy, Herbert Rudley, Seth Wagerman, Nancy Wible
- Music composed by Joe Raposo
- Conducted by Eric Rogers
- In charge of production: Lee Gunther
- Production managers: Kathy Condon, Steven Hahn
- Film editor: Robert Gillis
- Music editor: Joe Siracusa
