= Misterjaw =

American animated television series

- Title card
- First appearance: Flying Fool (1976)
- Portrayed by: Arte Johnson

In-universe information
- Species: Great White Shark
- Gender: Male

Misterjaw (left) with sidekick Catfish (right) in Merry Sharkman, Merry Sharkman

Misterjaw is a 34-episode animated television series, produced at DePatie-Freleng Enterprises in 1976 for The Pink Panther Laugh and a Half Hour and a Half Show television series on NBC. Reruns continued on the Think Pink Panther Show on NBC from September 11, 1977 through September 3, 1978.

== Plot ==
Misterjaw (voiced by Arte Johnson) was a blue-colored great white shark (who wore a purple vest with white collar, a black bow tie and black top hat) who liked to leap out of the water and shout "HEEGotcha!" or "Gotcha!" at unsuspecting folks who would run off in terror. He spoke with a German accent and was known to mispronounce words, such as "knucklehead" pronounced as "ka-nucklehead". He also had a sidekick, a green-scaled, brown bowler hatted Brooklyn-accented catfish named Catfish (voiced by Arnold Stang) who usually referred to Misterjaw as "Boss" or "Chief"; Misterjaw usually called Catfish either "pal-ly", "fella" or "sonny" when in a good mood, or names like "dumbkoff", "ka-nucklehead" or "macaroni brain" when irritated. At times, Misterjaw would mistakenly address his sidekick as "Dogfish", only to correct himself a split second later by saying "I mean, Catfish".

The primary goal of Misterjaw and Catfish was to catch Harry Halibut (voiced by Bob Ogle). In several instances, the duo were pursued by Fearless Freddy the Shark Hunter (voiced by Paul Winchell) in "Sea Chase", "Merry Sharkman, Merry Sharkman", "Transistorized Shark", and "Beach Resort".

All entries were directed by Robert McKimson (who died suddenly after production was completed) with co-direction from Sid Marcus and produced by David H. DePatie and Friz Freleng. The music and score for the series were composed by Doug Goodwin. A brief version of the John Williams Jaws theme was used with the variation of the two-note theme. None of the shorts contained any credit information; only the series title, episode title, 1976 copyright and end titles were shown. All episodes include a laugh track.

== Episodes ==
All episodes were directed by Robert McKimson and Sid Marcus.

1. "Flying Fool"
2. "Shopping Spree"
3. "To Catch a Halibut"
4. "Beach Resort"
5. "Monster of the Deep"
6. "Showbiz Shark"
7. "Aladdin's Lump"
8. "Little Red Riding Halibut" (a parody of Little Red Riding Hood)
9. "The Codfather" (a takeoff of The Godfather and the earlier DePatie–Freleng Enterprises cartoon series The Dogfather)
10. "Davey Jones' Locker"
11. "Flying Saucer"
12. "The Shape of Things"
13. "Caught in the Act"
14. "Merry Sharkman, Merry Sharkman" (a takeoff of Mary Hartman, Mary Hartman)
15. "Sea Chase"
16. "Aloha, Hah, Hah!"
17. "Never Shake Hands with a Piranha"
18. "Stand-In Room Only"
19. "The Fishy Time Machine"
20. "Transistorized Shark"
21. "The $6.95 Bionic Shark" (a takeoff of The Six Million Dollar Man)
22. "Moulin Rogues"
23. "Holiday in Venice"
24. "Shark and the Beanstalk" (a parody of Jack and the Beanstalk)
25. "The Aquanuts"
26. "Cannery Caper"
27. "Fish Anonymous"
28. "Maguiness Book of Records" (a takeoff of the Guinness Book of World Records)
29. "Cool Shark"
30. "Deep Sea Rodeo"
31. "Mama"
32. "Easy Come Easy Go"
33. "No Man's Halibut"
34. "Sweat Hog Shark" (a reference to Welcome Back, Kotter)

Episodes 2, 3, 5, 13, 21, 22, and 26 were pulled from NBC's 1977-1978 reruns of the show.

== Production notes ==
- Misterjaw is the fifth and final cartoon series to appear in the MGM Television distribution package.
- Misterjaw was one of two cartoon sharks created as a cash-in on the Jaws craze (the other being the Hanna-Barbera-created Jabberjaw).
- As of July 2005, Misterjaw has regularly been seen on Cartoon Network's Boomerang in the United States (along with The Pink Panther Show and other DePatie-Freleng cartoons). As of 2006, all the Misterjaw episodes have been aired. Three of the cartoons shown on Boomerang have been edited (some scenes from Beach Resort, Monster of the Deep, and the ending of Holiday in Venice were removed).
- The show was also known as Mr. Jaws and Catfish.
- In the entry Little Red Riding Halibut, Misterjaw quips "Verrry interesting..." after looking in a picnic basket that Harry Halibut left behind which was booby-trapped with mousetraps. This catchphrase was first uttered by Arte Johnson (who voiced Misterjaw) on Rowan & Martin's Laugh-In.
- Misterjaw was featured on South African television in the 1980s as a morning cartoon called "Grootbek en Katvis" and was dubbed into Afrikaans.

== Home video ==
=== VHS ===
Misterjaw Cartoon Festival Featuring Monster of the Deep was released for VHS on 1987 as part of the "Viddy-Oh for Kids". It contains the first five episodes of the series.

=== DVD / Blu-ray ===
The complete series was digitally remastered, issued on its own two-disc Blu-Ray/DVD collection (the first 17 shorts on disc 1 and the last 17 shorts on disc 2) by Kino Lorber (under license from MGM). It was released on April 24, 2018.
