= The Dogfather =

- The series' title card.
- Produced by: David H. DePatie; Friz Freleng
- Starring: Bob Holt; Daws Butler; Frank Welker; Hazel Shermet; Larry D. Mann; Joan Gerber
- Music by: John Bradford; Dean Elliot
- Production company: DePatie–Freleng Enterprises
- Distributed by: United Artists
- Running time: 6–10 minutes
- Country: United States
- Language: English

The Dogfather is an American series of 17 theatrical cartoon shorts produced by DePatie–Freleng Enterprises and distributed by United Artists between 1974 and 1976. It is the final theatrical cartoon series made by DePatie–Freleng.

== Premise ==
The Dogfather is a loose parody of The Godfather that follows the daily criminal activities of an Italian American Mafia-like syndicate in 1940s New York City composed of anthropomorphic dogs led by the titular Dogfather, a Cocker Spaniel based on Godfather character Vito Corleone. Most stories center on the Dogfather sending his henchmen, including his brawny but slow-witted right-hand man Pugg (sometimes spelled "Pug") as well as Louie the Labrador, who constantly tries to get on his boss's good side, to accomplish various tasks, often with comically unsuccessful results.

The opening credits feature the song "An Offer You Can't Refuse", with lyrics by John Bradford and music by Dean Elliot, named after a line spoken by Vito Corleone in The Godfather and sung by the Dogfather (except for the first short, where he speaks the lyrics).

The Dogfather was later broadcast as part of the NBC Saturday morning cartoon series The Pink Panther and Friends.

== List of shorts ==
No.	Title	Directed by	Story by	Original release date
1	"The Dogfather"	Hawley Pratt	Bob Ogle	June 27, 1974
A stray cat has wandered into Louie the Labrador's (Daws Butler) territory, so the Dogfather (Bob Holt, impersonating Marlon Brando as Vito Corleone) sends him and Pugg (also Holt) to oust him. However, Pugg keeps being attacked by a wildcat that has escaped the zoo, leaving Louie to fight the actual target. As a reward, the Dogfather gives Louie control of Pugg's territory.
2	"The Goose That Laid a Golden Egg"	Hawley Pratt	Friz Freleng	October 4, 1974
The Dogfather reads about a goose that laid a golden egg, so he and Pugg kidnap their suspected target, actually a gander, and try to force him to lay another in five minutes, unaware that the real egg-layer kept it a secret since she knew of the fate of the goose in the original fairytale. After the gander repeatedly fails to escape, the Dogfather attempts to shoot him, causing him to lay a golden egg in panic.
3	"Heist and Seek"	Gerry Chiniquy	Don Christensen	October 4, 1974
Pugg and another gang member named Rocky set out to rob Ripley's Jewelry Store and end up hiding an old house from persistent private investigator Sam Spaniel. Sam secretly plays tricks on gangsters while they try to get some rest to make Rocky suspect that Pugg wants to keep the stolen jewelry for himself, and later feigns being another criminal to trick them into getting arrested.
4	"The Big House Ain't a Home"	Gerry Chiniquy	Dave Detiege	October 31, 1974
Benny, an old friend of the Dogfather, is locked up in the pound, so the Dogfather sends Pugg and Louie out to rescue him, but Pugg and Louie get sent behind bars after the warden sees through their disguises and are forced to find a way to get out themselves. They break out with help from the rest of the gang, but Louie's attempt to stop the police by throwing tacks on the road is thwarted when the dogs carrying the car are forced to run across the tacks themselves, leading to the Dogfather and fellow gangster Willy the Whippet being arrested as well.
5	"Mother Dogfather"	Arthur Leonardi	Dave Detiege	October 31, 1974
A stork delivering a baby leaves the bundle in a garbage can, where a robber places an identical bag of stolen loot, causing the stork to mix up the bundles and take the loot. When he mistakes the Dogfather and Pugg for the baby's parents, the canines secure their house to prevent the stork from getting in, but the stork is determined to deliver its bundle. When the stork finally realizes his mistake, he rushes back to where he left the baby, but the dogs catch him. The dogs then accidentally pick up the baby, and after a policeman threatens to imprison them for child abandonment, they reluctantly decide to raise it.
6	"Bows and Errors"	Gerry Chiniquy	John W. Dunn	December 29, 1974
After the Dogfather reads about Robin Hood, he orders Pugg and Louie go on a spree to steal from the rich and give to the poor, namely the gang, but a rival cat gang led by Al E. Katt steals their money. After multiple failed attempts to break into the gang's hideout, they act on the Dogfather's advice to retrieve the safe but accidentally drop it on the front half of the boss's car.
7	"Deviled Yeggs"	John W. Dunn	Bob Ogle	December 29, 1974
The Dogfather hires Croaker McClaw, a feline assassin, to eliminate Charlie the Singer, a bird who threatens to inform on the dogs to the police. However, Croaker falls to his death during the chase and goes to Hell, where the Devil instructs him to wait on a bench for his remaining eight lives to join him. After losing one life to a plane crash and six more to a carnival accident, Croaker decides to give up the chase with only one life left, but the Dogfather and Pugg suspect that his favorite coin is lucky and take him to pursue Charlie together. They all wind up in Hell after a collision with a train.
8	"Watch the Birdie"	Gerry Chiniquy	John W. Dunn	March 20, 1975
Pugg is sent to stop Charlie the Singer from informing on the dogs to the police and chases the bird into a chemical factory, where Charlie sips "soda pop" that causes him to turn into a giant, monstrous version of himself whenever the Dogfather isn't watching. Pugg finally smashes the potion vial as Charlie escapes, but a fly sips some of the residue and experiences a similar effect, causing Pugg to flee. The Dogfather then offers to have the fly become a prize fighter, which it happily accepts.
9	"Saltwater Tuffy"	Arthur Leonardi	John W. Dunn	March 20, 1975
The Dogfather has lost his yacht, the Mary Belle, in a poker game against cat mobster Bucky McClaw, so he sends Pugg and Louie to steal it back. After the dogs repeatedly fail to get on the boat, they decide to sneak in from underneath but cut a hole that causes the boat to sink just as Bucky, having realized the boat makes him seasick, sells it back to the Dogfather.
10	"M-O-N-E-Y Spells Love"	Arthur Leonardi	Dave Detiege	April 23, 1975
The Dogfather tries to marry a widow exclusively for her money so he can buy an orphanage and turn it into a retirement home for his gang. However, he must compete with Rocky McSnarl, a rival gangster, for the widow's affections. After Pugg and Rocky fail to catch her in a chase, the Dogfather challenges Rocky to a poker game and wins with a "Double Ace of Spades". As the Dogfather is about to marry the widow, Rocky objects to the wedding to frame the Dogfather for marrying her for her money, but she admits she has no money, as she is the maid; the real widow is the "maid" the Dogfather met at the front door of the widow's house, so Rocky withdraws his objection, to the Dogfather's chagrin. This short reveals the Dogfather's real name as Cocker the Spaniel.
11	"Rock-A-Bye Maybe"	Gerry Chiniquy	John W. Dunn	April 23, 1975
The Dogfather sends Pugg to clean up his private mountain cabin so he can use it for some rest. When Pugg investigates, he finds two squirrels named Hickory and Coco have taken over since he and the other dogs last used the cabin a year ago to hide from the police. He ends up fighting to keep the squirrels from waking the boss. Each time, the squirrels evade discovery. The Dogfather commits Pugg to an insane asylum, having realized dealing with Pugg's incompetence caused his exhaustion.
12	"Haunting Dog"	Gerry Chiniquy	John W. Dunn	May 2, 1975
As an act of revenge for his contractual murder, Machine Gun Kolly's ghost possesses the Dogfather's new car he got from Machine Gun's will and inconveniences the boss and Pugg as they try to use it. After the Dogfather robs a bank, the car runs the gangsters into a police car, which gives them chase. Finally, the car flings the Dogfather and Pugg into a police precinct before Kolly's ghost sits back in the driver's seat and disappears along with the car.
13	"Eagle Beagles"	Gerry Chiniquy	John W. Dunn	May 5, 1975
The Dogfather and Pugg make a getaway from the police after a bank haul by escaping in an airplane the boss keeps for emergencies, but complications arise when the Dogfather chooses Pugg, who has never flown a plane, as the pilot. Together, they fly out to the Bahamas, and when Pugg puts the plane on autopilot, he ends up flying the plane underwater; after they resurface, Pugg accidentally ejects the Dogfather while draining the plane water, and they parachute into a federal prison as the plane continues to fly with the loot on board.
14	"From Nags to Riches"	Gerry Chiniquy	John W. Dunn	May 5, 1975
The Dogfather offers to trade Streaker, his old and worn-out race horse, for Lightning, his neighbor Dutch Schnauzer's speedy stallion. In order to fully own him, he must catch him, so he, Pugg, and Louie try their best to capture the steed to send him to the races. They capture Lightning by appealing to his ego with a mirror, and Louie is chosen as the jockey. However, Lightning throws off Louie and chases him onto the derby track as the races begin. Dutch motivates Streaker to come in second by threatening to send him to the glue factory, but Streaker is promoted to first after Lightning is disqualified for racing with no jockey.
15	"Goldilox & the Three Hoods"	Gerry Chiniquy	John W. Dunn	August 28, 1975
The Dogfather tells his nephew a bedtime story about himself, Pugg, and Louie seeking to help three pig police officers search for Goldilox, who is on the run from the law, in return for a reward. After Goldilox eats Louie's pizza, breaks his chair, and sleeps in his bed, the dogs try to scare her out of their forest house with a mouse, only for the pigs arrest all four of them as they chase her out the back. The Dogfather falls asleep as he concludes his story.
16	"Rockhounds"	Arthur Leonardi	John W. Dunn	November 20, 1975
Pugg becomes a butler to the wealthy Van Waggers to steal their prized Pedigree Diamond. After the Van Waggers go out to the opera and leave Pugg in charge, he takes the diamond, but the Van Waggers' young son plays tricks and games to keep the diamond out of Pugg's hands. At the Dogfather's suggestion, Pugg encourages the boy to draw a treasure map to the diamond, but the boy misleads him and the boss into being chased by Spot, the family guard dog.
17	"Medicur"	Gerry Chiniquy	John W. Dunn	April 30, 1976
Rocky McSnarl breaks out of prison and swears revenge on the Dogfather, who hides in a hospital as a patient. However, Rocky finds out where he is from a pigeon and disguises himself as a female nurse. After Rocky unsuccessfully attempts to kill him, the Dogfather incapacitates the doctor with his head bandages and figures out who his "nurse" is from a cigar he throws aside. Rocky, mistaking the doctor for the Dogfather, takes him up to the sun roof and drops him in the pool, while the Dogfather does the same to Rocky, exposing his real identity and leading to his being committed to a psychiatric ward.

== Remakes ==
Much like a number of DFE-produced cartoon shorts, 9 of the 17 Dogfather cartoons were remakes of Looney Tunes cartoons from 1948-57 that were directed by Freleng, which are listed below:

- The pilot episode (The Dogfather) was a remake of Tree for Two (1952).
- The Goose that Laid a Golden Egg was a remake of Golden Yeggs (1950).
- Heist and Seek was a remake of Bugsy and Mugsy (1957).
- Mother Dogfather was a remake of Stork Naked (1955).
- Devilled Yeggs was a remake of Satan's Waitin' (1954).
- Watch the Birdie was a remake of Dr. Jerkyll's Hide (1954) and Hyde and Go Tweet (1960).
- Saltwater Tuffy was a remake of Tugboat Granny (1956).
- M-O-N-E-Y Spells Love was a remake of Hare Trimmed (1953)
- Eagle Beagles was a remake of Hare Lift (1952).

== Home media ==
Kino Lorber (under license from MGM) released all 17 shorts on DVD and Blu-ray in April 2018.

== Revival ==
In 1993, the Dogfather, Pugg, and Louie were included as recurring antagonists for The Pink Panther, but they were radically reinterpreted as more original characters with a modern uncouth gangster motif. Furthermore, whereas Louie was originally the shortest of the three, the new Dogfather, now a bulldog, is the shortest; and Louie is the only member of the trio to speak with a Californian accent instead of a New York one. The Dogfather is voiced by Joe Piscopo (except for "It's Just a Gypsy in My Soup", where he is voiced by Jim Cummings), while Pugg and Louie are voiced by Brian George and Jess Harnell.

These versions of the characters are also the main antagonists for the 1996 computer game The Pink Panther: Passport to Peril, with the Dogfather voiced by Barry Carrollo, Pugg voiced by Jonathan Fedinatz, and Louie voiced by Michael Sinterniklaas. In the game, the Dogfather schemes to ruin the reputation of the prestigious summer camp Chilly Wa-Wa so he can open a "Dogburger" fast food restaurant in its place, while Pugg and Louie unsuccessfully attempt to thwart the Pink Panther's efforts to stop them.

Images of Pugg and Louie as infants appear during a musical number about the myth of Pegasus to represent two of Poseidon's children in Passport to Peril's 1997 sequel, The Pink Panther: Hokus Pokus Pink.
