= The Blue Racer =

Series of theatrical cartoons

- The Blue Racer and a Japanese beetle appeared in Blue Racer Blues.
- First appearance: Snake in the Gracias (1971) (Tijuana Toads cartoon)
- Portrayed by: Larry D. Mann; Bob Holt

In-universe information
- Species: Snake
- Gender: Male

The Blue Racer is a series of 17 theatrical cartoons produced from 1972 to 1974 created by Friz Freleng and David H. DePatie. The character's first cartoon, Snake in the Gracias, was released theatrically on January 24, 1971.

== Production ==
The cartoons were directed by Art Davis, Gerry Chiniquy, Sid Marcus, Robert McKimson, David Deneen, Bob Balser, Cullen Houghtaling and produced by David H. DePatie and Friz Freleng. The majority of the cartoons were animated at the DePatie-Freleng studio, except for two done overseas: Aches and Snakes at Australia's Filmgraphics studio, and Little Boa Peep at Spain's Pegbar Productions.

== Plot ==
A fast-moving blue snake named the Blue Racer (voiced by Larry D. Mann) tries unsuccessfully to catch a stereotypically-Japanese beetle (voiced by Tom Holland), who is a black belt in karate. Both characters spun off from Tijuana Toads in "Hop and Chop" (the Japanese beetle) and "Snake in the Gracias" (the Blue Racer). The goofy crane from Tijuana Toads (Crazylegs Crane, who also repeatedly failed to collar the Racer and the Toads himself) also later appeared in the series as well. 17 cartoons were produced.

== Production ==
- Bob Holt voiced both the Blue Racer and the Japanese Beetle in the 1972 short Support Your Local Serpent.
- The Japanese Beetle's last appearance was in the 1972 short Blue Racer Blues.
- The Blue Racer makes a cameo appearance in the made-for-television Pink Panther short "Pink-Tails for Two" in 1978.

== Filmography ==
All cartoons were written by John W. Dunn.

No.	Title	Directed by:	Released:
1	Hiss and Hers	Gerry Chiniquy	July 3, 1972
2	Support Your Local Serpent	Art Davis	July 9, 1972
3	Nippon Tuck	Gerry Chiniquy	July 19, 1972
4	Punch and Judo	Art Davis	July 23, 1972
5	Love and Hisses	Gerry Chiniquy	August 3, 1972
6	Camera Bug	Art Davis	August 6, 1972
7	Yokohama Mama	Gerry Chiniquy	December 24, 1972
8	Blue Racer Blues	Art Davis	December 31, 1972
9	The Boa Friend	Gerry Chiniquy	February 11, 1973
10	Wham and Eggs	Art Davis	February 18, 1973
11	Killarney Blarney	Gerry Chiniquy	May 16, 1973
12	Blue Aces Wild	Gerry Chiniquy	May 16, 1973
13	Fowl Play	Bob McKimson	June 1, 1973
14	Freeze a Jolly Good Fellow	Sid Marcus	June 1, 1973
15	Snake Preview	Cullen Houghtaling	August 10, 1973
16	Aches and Snakes	David Deneen	August 10, 1973
17	Little Boa Peep	Bob Balser	January 16, 1974

== Other appearances ==
The Blue Racer (or a snake looking just like him) appeared in the 1978 Pink Panther cartoon Pinktails for Two where he mistook the Panther's pink tail for a lady snake. In this film, the Blue Racer did not speak or move with super-speed.

== Home video ==
All 17 shorts were available on DVD and Blu-ray on May 30, 2017 from Kino Lorber (through their deal with MGM Home Entertainment). Extras included were audio commentaries and two featurettes.
