= Hoot Kloot =

- Sheriff Hoot Kloot atop his horse, Fester
- First appearance: Kloot's Kounty (1973)
- Portrayed by: Bob Holt

In-universe information
- Species: Human
- Gender: Male
- Occupation: Sheriff

Hoot Kloot is an American series of 17 theatrical cartoon shorts produced by DePatie–Freleng Enterprises from 1973 to 1974.

== Plot ==
Sheriff Hoot Kloot is a diminutive, short-tempered lawman who tries to maintain order in a remote western town. He is aided by his loyal horse Fester whom Kloot refers to simply as "Horse". Fester remains Kloot's honest and faithful friend, often giving the Sheriff the benefit of his homespun wisdom while battling various outlaws including Crazywolf, a looney sheep-stealing wolf.

Hoot Kloot was later broadcast as part of the NBC Saturday morning cartoon series The Pink Panther and Friends.

== Filmography ==
All cartoons written by John W. Dunn.

No.	Title	Directed by	Original release date
1	Kloot's Kounty	Hawley Pratt	January 19, 1973
2	Apache on the County Seat	Hawley Pratt	June 16, 1973
3	The Shoe Must Go On	Gerry Chiniquy	June 16, 1973
4	A Self-Winding Sidewinder	Roy Morita	October 9, 1973
5	Pay Your Buffalo Bill	Gerry Chiniquy	October 9, 1973
6	Stirrups and Hiccups	Gerry Chiniquy	October 15, 1973
7	Ten Miles to the Gallop	Arthur Leonardi	October 15, 1973
8	Phony Express	Gerry Chiniquy	January 4, 1974
9	Giddy Up Woe	Sid Marcus	January 9, 1974
10	Gold Struck	Roy Morita	January 9, 1974
11	As the Tumbleweed Turns	Gerry Chiniquy	April 8, 1974
12	The Badge and the Beautiful	Bob Balsar	April 17, 1974
13	Big Beef at O.K. Corral	Bob Balsar	April 17, 1974
14	By Hoot or By Crook	Bob Balsar	April 17, 1974
15	Strange on the Range	Durward Bonaye	April 17, 1974
16	Mesa Trouble	Sid Marcus	May 16, 1974
17	Saddle Soap Opera	Gerry Chiniquy	May 16, 1974

== Credits ==
- Produced by: David H. DePatie and Friz Freleng
- Story: John W. Dunn
- Animation: Bob Bemiller, John Freeman, Bob Richardson, Reuben Timmins, Don Williams
- Title Designer: Arthur Leonardi
- Layout: Martin Strudler
- Background: Richard Thomas
- Voices:
  - Hoot Kloot/Fester - Bob Holt
  - Crazywolf - Larry D. Mann
- Camera: John Burton Jr.
- Executive in Charge of Production: Lee Gunther
- Film Editor: Joe Siracusa
- Musical Director: Doug Goodwin
- Musicians:
  - Larry Ketchum - piano
  - Harold Wass - violin
  - Scott Jordan - guitar
  - Polly Henry - flute
  - Angela Shea - saxophone
  - Tom Sebastian - bass

== Home video ==
Kino Lorber (through their deal with MGM Home Entertainment) released all 17 shorts on DVD and Blu-ray in May 2017.
