= Bob Holt (actor) =

American actor (1928–1985)

- Photo of Holt in an unknown date
- Born: Robert John Holthaus; December 28, 1928; St. Louis, Missouri, U.S.
- Died: August 2, 1985 (aged 56); Van Nuys, California, U.S.
- Occupation: Actor
- Years active: 1950–1985

Robert John Holthaus (December 28, 1928 – August 2, 1985), better known as Bob Holt, was an American actor, best known for his voice work.

== Career ==
Holt's first film role came in 1950, acting as Octavius Caesar in Julius Caesar. His career as a voice artist began with the 1968 short film Johnny Learns His Manners, for which he provided all of the voices. He later appeared in such works as Bedknobs and Broomsticks, the animated film version of Charlotte's Web as Homer Zuckerman, and several animated Dr. Seuss television specials including The Lorax (1972), Dr. Seuss on the Loose (1973), The Hoober-Bloob Highway (1975) and The Grinch Grinches the Cat in the Hat (1982).

Holt appeared in a variety of different works, including animated films for both adults (the 1974 sequel The Nine Lives of Fritz the Cat) and for children, as well as voice and acting work in live-action films (for the blaxploitation film Abby, Holt provided the voice of the Demon). In 1975, he was the voice of Grape Ape on The New Tom & Jerry Show. Holt later provided the voice of Avatar in Ralph Bakshi's film Wizards. Avatar's voice was an imitation of actor Peter Falk.

In 1982, Bob Holt played the title role in Marvel Productions' animated The Incredible Hulk, also in the process creating a library of stock roars that would be used for many years afterwards.

== Death ==
Holt died of a heart attack on August 2, 1985, in Van Nuys, California. His interment was at Forest Lawn Memorial Park, Glendale.

== Selected filmography ==
- Julius Caesar (1950) .... Octavius Caesar
- The Great St. Louis Bank Robbery (1959) .... Police Dispatcher
- Johnny Learns His Manners (1968, Short) .... (voice)
- Doctor Dolittle (1970, TV Series) .... Dr. John Dolittle (voice, as Robert Holt)
- Curiosity Shop (1971, TV Series) .... Professor Trivia, Baron Balthazar, Oliver Wendell Lookout, Mr. Grimmis, additional voices
- Bedknobs and Broomsticks (1971) .... Mr. Codfish (voice) (as Robert Holt)
- The Mouse Returns (1971) .... Yuri Haruto (voice)
- Love, American Style (1972, TV Series) .... Williams (segment "Love and the Private Eye") (voice)
- The Lorax (1972, TV Short) .... The Lorax, The Once-ler (voice)
- Flight to the Finish (1972, TV Movie) .... Crazylegs Crane (voice)
- Support Your Local Serpent (1972, Short) .... The Blue Racer / Japanese Beetle (voice)
- The Barkleys (1972, TV Series) .... (voice)
- The Houndcats (1972, TV Series) .... (voice)
- New Zoo Revue (1972, TV Series) .... Charlie Owl (voice)
- Kloot's Kounty (1973, Short) .... Hoot Kloot (voice)
- Wham and Eggs (1973, Short) .... Dragon (voice)
- Charlotte's Web (1973) .... Homer Zuckerman (voice)
- The Shoe Must Go On (1973) .... Hoot Kloot / Fester (voice)
- Apache on the County Seat (1973, Short) .... Hoot Kloot / Fester / Indians (voice)
- The Addams Family (1973, TV Series) .... (voice)
- Bailey's Comets (1973, TV Series) .... Dude, Voices (voices)
- Pay Your Buffalo Bill (1973, Short) .... Hoot Kloot / Fester (voice)
- A Self-Winding Sidewinder (1973, Short) .... Hoot Kloot / Fester / Crazywolf / Townspeople (voice)
- Ten Miles to the Gallop (1973, Short) .... Hoot Kloot / Fester (voice)
- Stirrups and Hiccups (1973, Short) .... Hoot Kloot / Fester / Mild-Bill Hiccup / Wild-Bill Hiccup / Wyatt Earp (voice)
- Dr. Seuss on the Loose (1973, TV Short) .... Sneetches / Sylvester McMonkey McBean (voice)
- The Bear Who Slept Through Christmas (1973, TV Short) .... Santa Claus / Mayor C. Emory Bear (voice, as Robert Holt)
- Phony Express (1974, Short) .... Hoot Kloot / Fester / Mailman / Thief / Horse / Postmaster (voice)
- Gold Struck (1974, Short) .... Hoot Kloot / Fester (voice)
- Giddy Up Woe (1974, Short) .... Hoot Kloot / Fester / Robber / Alf Willett (voice)
- As the Tumbleweed Turns (1974, Short) .... Hoot Kloot / Fester / Railroad President (voice)
- The Badge and the Beautiful (1974, Short) .... Hoot Kloot / Fester (voice)
- Strange on the Range (1974, Short) .... Hoot Kloot / Fester / Billy the Kidder (voice)
- By Hoot or by Crook (1974, Short) .... Hoot Kloot / Fester (voice)
- Big Beef at the O.K. Corral (1974, Short) .... Hoot Kloot / Fester (voice)
- Saddle Soap Opera (1974, Short) .... Hoot Kloot / Fester (voice)
- Mesa Trouble (1974, Short) .... Hoot Kloot / Fester / Townspeople (voice)
- The Nine Lives of Fritz the Cat (1974) .... (voice)
- The Dogfather (1974, Short) .... Dogfather (voice)
- Oliver Twist (1974) .... (voice, as Robert Holt)
- Hong Kong Phooey (1974, TV Series) .... (voice)
- The Goose That Laid a Golden Egg (1974, Short) .... Dogfather / Pugg (voice)
- Heist and Seek (1974, Short) .... Dogfather / Pugg / Translator (voice)
- The Big House Ain't a Home (1974, Short) .... Dogfather / Pugg (voice)
- Mother Dogfather (1974, Short) .... Dogfather / Pugg (voice)
- Abby (1974) .... The Demon (voice)
- Deviled Yeggs (1974, Short) .... Dogfather / Pugg (voice)
- Bows and Errors (1974, Short) .... Dogfather (voice)
- The Hoober-Bloob Highway (1975, TV Movie) .... Mr. Hoober-Bloob / Snail Race Announcer (voice)
- Watch the Birdie (1975, Short) .... Dogfather / Pugg (voice)
- Saltwater Tuffy (1975, Short) .... Dogfather / Pugg (voice)
- Rock-a-Bye Maybe (1975, Short) .... Dogfather (voice)
- M-o-n-e-y Spells Love (1975, Short) .... Dogfather / Pugg / Rocky / Priest (voice)
- Haunting Dog (1975, Short) .... Dogfather (voice)
- From Nags to Riches (1975, Short) .... Dogfather / Pugg (voice)
- Eagle Beagles (1975, Short) .... Dogfather / Pugg (voice)
- The Day of the Locust (1975) .... Tour Guide
- The Great Grape Ape Show (1975, TV Series) .... Grape Ape (voice)
- Goldilox & the Three Hoods (1975, Short) .... Dogfather / Pugg (voice)
- The Oddball Couple (1975, TV Series) .... (voice)
- Rockhounds (1975, Short) .... Dogfather / Pugg / Boy (voice)
- Fraidy Cat (1975, TV Series) .... (voice, uncredited)
- Uncle Croc's Block (1975, TV Series) .... (voice, uncredited)
- Medicur (1976, Short) .... Dogfather / Rocky McSnarl / Doctor (voice)
- The Pink Panther and Friends (1976, TV Series) .... Hoot Kloot / Fester / Harry Halibut (voice)
- Tony Orlando and Dawn (1976, TV Series) .... Regular
- The Scooby-Doo/Dynomutt Hour (1976, TV Series) .... (voice)
- Dynomutt, Dog Wonder (1976, TV Series) .... (voice)
- Wizards (1977) .... Avatar (voice)
- The Mouse and His Child (1977) .... Muskrat (voice)
- The Kentucky Fried Movie (1977) .... (voice)
- The Skatebirds (1977, TV Series) .... Satchel Pelican (voice)
- Captain Caveman and the Teen Angels (1977, TV Series) .... (voice)
- Scooby's All-Star Laff-a-Lympics (1977, TV Series) .... Dinky Dalton / Grape Ape / Orville Octopus (voice)
- Fabulous Funnies (1978, TV Series) .... Alley Oop / Foozy / Gaylord (voice)
- Challenge of the Superfriends (1978, TV Series) .... (voice)
- The Puppy Who Wanted a Boy (1978, TV Series) .... (voice)
- The New Animated Adventures of Flash Gordon (1979, TV Series) .... (voice)
- Strawberry Shortcake in Big Apple City (1981, TV Short) .... Coco Nutwork (voice)
- Dennis the Menace in Mayday for Mother (1981, TV Short) .... Henry Mitchell (voice)
- Spider-Man and His Amazing Friends (1981, TV Series) .... The Juggernaut (roars) (voice)
- The Kwicky Koala Show (1981, TV Series) .... (voice)
- The Grinch Grinches the Cat in the Hat (1982, TV Short) .... The Grinch / Waiter / The Grinch's Mother (voice)
- Flash Gordon: The Greatest Adventure of All (1982, TV Movie) .... Dr. Zarkov (voice)
- The American Adventure (1982) .... John Muir, Store Owner (voice)
- The Smurfs (1982-1983, TV Series) .... The King (voice)
- The Incredible Hulk (1982-1983, TV Series) .... The Hulk (voice)
- Puff and the Incredible Mr. Nobody (1982, TV Movie) .... Father (voice)
- Rubik, the Amazing Cube (1983, TV Series) .... (voice)
- Horizons (1983) .... Grandfather (voice)
- Dungeons & Dragons (1983, TV Series) .... Shadow Demon
- The Biskitts (1983, TV Series) .... Spinner / Bump / Flip
- Peter and the Magic Egg (1983, TV Movie) .... Papa Doppler / Kookybird (voice)
- The Dukes (1983, TV Series) .... (voice)
- Gremlins (1984) .... Mogwai / Gremlins (voice)
- Lucky Luke (1984-1985, TV series) .... Averell Dalton (English version, voice)
- Snorks (1984-1985, TV Series) .... Mr. Seaworthy (voice)
- Challenge of the GoBots (1984-1985, TV Series) .... Cop-Tur (voice)
- Explorers (1985) .... Special vocal effects (voice, as Robert Holt)
- The 13 Ghosts of Scooby-Doo (1985, TV Series) .... Zagras (voice)
- Disney's Adventures of the Gummi Bears (1985, TV Series) .... Dom Gordo of Ghent / Giant (voice)
- Galtar and the Golden Lance (1985, TV Series) .... (voice)
- The Adventures of the American Rabbit (1986) .... Rodney / Penguin 3 (voice) (final film released after his death)
- In Search of Dr. Seuss (1994) ….. The Once-ler / The Lorax / Sylvester McMonkey McBean / Plain-Bellied Sneetches / Star-Bellied Sneetches (archival recordings)
