= Bob Ogle =

American actor (1924–84)

- Born: Robert Allen Ogle; May 28, 1926; Sacramento County, California, US
- Died: February 25, 1984 (aged 57); Los Angeles, California, US
- Other name: Allen Ogle
- Years active: 1942–1984

Robert Allen Ogle (May 28, 1926 – February 25, 1984), known as Bob Ogle, was an American voice actor, animator and writer. Most characters he voiced are performed in the style of Bill Thompson's character Wallace Wimple from Fibber McGee and Molly.

== Death ==
Ogle died suddenly of a heart attack in February 1984 during the production of Shirt Tales.

== Filmography ==
=== Film ===
- Four Methods of Flush Riveting - Narrator

=== Television ===
- Shirt Tales - Digger the Mole
- The Kwicky Koala Show - Kwicky Koala
- The Pink Panther Show - Harry Halibut (of "Misterjaw")
- What's New Mr. Magoo? - Mc Barker

== Staff work ==
- Parrotville - Writer
- A Charlie Brown Celebration - Writer
- Casper and the Angels - Story Editor
- Casper's First Christmas - Story
- Casper Saves Halloween - Story
- Shirt Tales - Writer
- The All-New Popeye Hour - Story, Story Editor
- The Jim Backus Show - Writer
- The Kwicky Koala Show - Writer, Story Director
- Wheelie and the Chopper Bunch - Writer
- Yogi's Gang - Story Director
