= List of animated short films of the 1970s =

Films are sorted by year and then alphabetically. They include theatrical, television, and direct-to-video films with less than 40 minutes runtime. For a list of films with over 40 minutes of runtime, see List of animated feature films of the 1970s.

== 1970 ==
Name	Country	Technique
Seals on the Loose	United States	Traditional Animation
Ants in the Pantry	United States	Traditional Animation
Apel	Poland	Cutout Animation
Bridgework	United States	Traditional Animation
Buster's Last Stand	United States	Traditional Animation
Charlie in Hot Water	United States	Traditional Animation
Charlie's Golf Classic	United States	Traditional Animation
Chilly's Cold War	United States	Traditional Animation
Chilly's Ice Folly	United States	Traditional Animation
Christmas Is	United States	Traditional Animation
Coo Coo Nuts	United States	Traditional Animation
Don't Hustle an Ant with Muscle	United States	Traditional Animation
A Dopey Hacienda	United States	Traditional Animation
Eggs	United States	Traditional Animation
The Foul Kin	United States	Traditional Animation
The Froggy Froggy Duo	United States	Traditional Animation
The Froze Nose Knows	United States	Traditional Animation
The Further Adventures of Uncle Sam	United States	Traditional Animation
Gem Dandy	United States	Traditional Animation
A Gooney Is Born	United States	Traditional Animation
Gooney's Goofy Landings	United States	Traditional Animation
Hi-Rise Wise Guys	United States	Traditional Animation
Hop and Chop	United States	Traditional Animation
Horton Hears a Who!	United States	Traditional Animation
Is It Always Right to Be Right?	United States	Traditional Animation
Karlsson Returns	Soviet Union	Traditional Animation
Koori no Kuni no Misuke	Japan	Traditional Animation
Little Dingy	Soviet Union	Traditional Animation
Mr. Rossi at Camping	Italy	Traditional Animation
Mumbo Jumbo	United States	Traditional Animation
Never on Thirsty	United States	Traditional Animation
The Night the Animals Talked	United States	Traditional Animation
Odd Ant Out	United States	Traditional Animation
Okashina Ichinichi	Japan	Traditional Animation
Order in the House	Hungary	Traditional Animation
The Ossuary	Czechoslovakia	Live-action/stop-motion
Robin Goodhood	United States	Traditional Animation
Rosie's Walk	Czechoslovakia, United States	Traditional Animation
Sansür	Turkey	Cutout Animation
Say Cheese, Please	United States	Traditional Animation
Seal on the Loose	United States	Traditional Animation
Science Friction	United States	Traditional Animation
Scratch a Tiger	United States	Traditional Animation
The Story of Little John Bailey	Netherlands	Traditional Animation
A Taste of Money	United States	Traditional Animation
The Ugly Duckling	Japan	Stop-motion Animation
The Unhandy Man	United States	Traditional Animation
War and Pieces	United States	Traditional Animation
Wavelengths	Hungary	Experimental
Why People Have Special Jobs, or The Man Who Made Spinning Tops	United States	Traditional Animation
Wild Bill Hiccup	United States	Traditional Animation
Yasashii Lion	Japan	Traditional Animation

== 1971 ==
Name	Country	Technique
Airlift A La Carte	United States	Traditional Animation
The Battle of Kerzhenets	Soviet Union	Stop-motion Animation
The Bungling Builder	United States	Traditional Animation
The Cat in the Hat	United States	Traditional Animation
Cattle Battle	United States	Traditional Animation
Charlie the Rain Maker	United States	Traditional Animation
Cheburashka	Soviet Union	Traditional Animation
Chilly's Hide-A-Way	United States	Traditional Animation
Croakus Pocus	United States	Traditional Animation
The Crunch Bird	United States	Traditional Animation
A Christmas Carol	United States	Traditional Animation
The Egg and Ay-Yi-Yi!	United States	Traditional Animation
Evolution	Canada	Traditional Animation
Fastest Tongue in the West	United States	Traditional Animation
A Fink in the Rink	United States	Traditional Animation
Flim Flam Fountain	United States	Traditional Animation
A Fly in the Pink	United States	Traditional Animation
From Bed to Worse	United States	Traditional Animation
The Foolish Frog	United States	Traditional Animation
Freedom River	United States	Traditional Animation
Gong with the Pink	United States	Traditional Animation
The Great Continental Overland Cross-Country Race	United States	Traditional Animation
Hot Stuff	Canada	Traditional Animation
How Death Came to Earth	Canada	Cutout Animation
How to Trap a Woodpecker	United States	Traditional Animation
Jabberwocky	Czechoslovakia	Live-action/stop-motion
Kitty from the City	United States	Traditional Animation
A Leap in the Deep	United States	Traditional Animation
Losharik	Soviet Union	Stop-motion Animation
The Man Who Had to Sing	Yugoslavia	Traditional Animation
Metadata	Canada	Computer Animation
Minami e Itta Misuke	Japan	Traditional Animation
Moochin Pooch	United States	Traditional Animation
Mr. Rossi at the Safari	Italy	Traditional Animation
Mud Squad	United States	Traditional Animation
Pink Blue Plate	United States	Traditional Animation
The Pink Flea	United States	Traditional Animation
Pink-In	United States	Traditional Animation
Pink Pranks	United States	Traditional Animation
Pink Tuba-Dore	United States	Traditional Animation
Play It Again, Charlie Brown	United States	Traditional Animation
Psst Pink	United States	Traditional Animation
The Reluctant Recruit	United States	Traditional Animation
Rough Brunch	United States	Traditional Animation
Serape Happy	United States	Traditional Animation
Shanghai Woody	United States	Traditional Animation
Sleepy Time Chimes	United States	Traditional Animation
Snake in the Gracias	United States	Traditional Animation
The Snoozin' Bruin	United States	Traditional Animation
Synchromy	Canada	Experimental
Trick or Retreat	United States	Traditional Animation
Two Jumps and a Chump	United States	Traditional Animation
Winnie-the-Pooh Pays a Visit	Soviet Union	Traditional Animation
Woody's Magic Touch	United States	Traditional Animation

== 1972 ==
Name	Country	Technique
After School	China	Traditional Animation
Air!	Canada	Traditional Animation
Balablok	Canada	Traditional Animation
Le bleu perdu	Canada	Traditional Animation
Blue Racer Blues	United States	Traditional Animation
Bye, Bye, Blackboard	United States	Traditional Animation
Camera Bug	United States	Traditional Animation
Chili Con Corny	United States	Traditional Animation
A Christmas Story	United States	Traditional Animation
A Computer Animated Hand	United States	Computer Animation
Dance School	Hungary	Traditional Animation
Dig	United States	Traditional Animation
A Fish Story	United States	Traditional Animation
Flight to the Finish	United States	Traditional Animation
For the Love of Pizza	United States	Traditional Animation
French Windows	United Kingdom	Traditional Animation
Frog Jog	United States	Traditional Animation
The Genie with the Light Touch	United States	Traditional Animation
Gold Diggin' Woodpecker	United States	Traditional Animation
Hiss and Hers	United States	Traditional Animation
Ikiteirutte Subarashii!	Japan	Traditional Animation
Indian Corn	United States	Traditional Animation
Kama Sutra Rides Again	United Kingdom	Traditional Animation
The Legend of Sleepy Hollow	United States	Traditional Animation
Leonardo's Diary	Czechoslovakia	Live-action/stop-motion
Let Charlie Do It	United States	Traditional Animation
The Lorax	United States	Traditional Animation
Love and Hisses	United States	Traditional Animation
Nights in the Boulevard	Hungary	Traditional Animation
Nippon Tuck	United States	Traditional Animation
Okashi na Tenkousei	Japan	Traditional Animation
Panda Kopanda	Japan	Traditional Animation
The Peasant's Pea Patch: A Russian Folk Tale	United States	Traditional Animation
Pecking Holes in Poles	United States	Traditional Animation
Pink 8 Ball	United States	Traditional Animation
Punch and Judo	United States	Traditional Animation
Rain, Rain, Go Away	United States	Traditional Animation
The Rude Intruder	United States	Traditional Animation
The Selfish Giant	Canada	Traditional Animation
Show Biz Beagle	United States	Traditional Animation
Street Musique	Canada	Traditional Animation
Support Your Local Serpent	United States	Traditional Animation
The Thanksgiving That Almost Wasn't	United States	Traditional Animation
The Three Rabbits	Hungary	Traditional Animation
Tup Tup	Yugoslavia	Traditional Animation
Unlucky Potluck	United States	Traditional Animation
Why We Have Elections, or The Kings of Snark	United States	Traditional Animation
Winnie-the-Pooh and a Busy Day	Soviet Union	Traditional Animation
Yokohama Mama	United States	Traditional Animation
You're Not Elected, Charlie Brown	United States	Traditional Animation

== 1973 ==
Name	Country	Technique
Apache on the County Seat	United States	Traditional Animation
Aches and Snakes	United States	Traditional Animation
The Bear Who Slept Through Christmas	United States	Traditional Animation
B.C.: The First Thanksgiving	United States	Traditional Animation
Blue Aces Wild	United States	Traditional Animation
The Boa Friend	United States	Traditional Animation
Changes, Changes	United States	Traditional Animation
A Charlie Brown Thanksgiving	United States	Traditional Animation
Cockaboody	United States	Traditional Animation
Cosmic Cartoon	United States	Traditional Animation
The Cricket in Times Square	United States	Traditional Animation
Dr. Seuss on the Loose	United States	Traditional Animation
The Family That Dwelt Apart	Canada	Traditional Animation
Fowl Play	United States	Traditional Animation
Frank Film	United States	Cutout Animation
Freeze a Jolly Good Fellow	United States	Traditional Animation
The Giving Tree	United States	Traditional Animation
Hunger	Canada	Traditional Animation
Killarney Blarney	United States	Traditional Animation
Kloot's Kounty	United States	Traditional Animation
Little Sentinel of East China Sea	China	Traditional Animation
Little Trumpeter	China	Traditional Animation
Many Tales in a Row	Hungary	Traditional Animation
The Nutcracker	Soviet Union	Traditional Animation
On the Trail of the Bremen Town Musicians	Soviet Union	Traditional Animation
Opera	Italy	Traditional Animation
Panda Kopanda: Amefuri Sākasu no Maki	Japan	Traditional Animation
Pay Your Buffalo Bill	United States	Traditional Animation
Pulcinella	Italy	Traditional Animation
A Self-Winding Sidewinder	United States	Traditional Animation
The Shoe Must Go On	United States	Traditional Animation
Snake Preview	United States	Traditional Animation
Stirrups and Hiccups	United States	Traditional Animation
Ten Miles to the Gallop	United States	Traditional Animation
There's No Time for Love, Charlie Brown	United States	Traditional Animation
A Very Merry Cricket	United States	Traditional Animation
Wham and Eggs	United States	Traditional Animation

== 1974 ==
Name	Country	Technique
The Adventures of a Man in Search of a Heart	United States	Traditional Animation
As the Tumbleweed Turns	United States	Traditional Animation
The Badge and the Beautiful	United States	Traditional Animation
Basketball Jones	United States	Traditional Animation
The Beast of Monsieur Racine	United States	Traditional Animation
Big Beef at O.K. Corral	United States	Traditional Animation
The Big House Ain't a Home	United States	Traditional Animation
Bows and Errors	United States	Traditional Animation
By Hoot or By Crook	United States	Traditional Animation
Cat's Cradle	Canada	Traditional Animation
The City That Forgot About Christmas	United States	Traditional Animation
Closed Mondays	United States	Stop-motion Animation
Devilled Yeggs	United States	Traditional Animation
The Diary	Yugoslavia	Traditional Animation
The Dogfather	United States	Traditional Animation
Easter Is	United States	Traditional Animation
Ek Anek Aur Ekta	India	Cutout Animation
En la Selva hay Mucho por Hacer	Uruguay	Cutout Animation
Freedom 2000	United States	Traditional Animation
Fuji	United States	Live-action/traditional/abstract
Giddy Up Woe	United States	Traditional Animation
Gold Struck	United States	Traditional Animation
The Goose That Laid a Golden Egg	United States	Traditional Animation
Heist and Seek	United States	Traditional Animation
The Happy Prince	Canada	Traditional Animation
The Heron and the Crane	Soviet Union	Traditional Animation
Hunger	Canada	Computer Animation
It's a Mystery, Charlie Brown	United States	Traditional Animation
It's the Easter Beagle, Charlie Brown	United States	Traditional Animation
Little Boa Peep	United States	Traditional Animation
Mesa Trouble	United States	Traditional Animation
Mother Dogfather	United States	Traditional Animation
Mr Rossi in Venice	Italy	Traditional Animation
The Owl Who Married a Goose: An Eskimo Legend	Canada	Sand
Phony Express	United States	Traditional Animation
Pink Aye	United States	Traditional Animation
Popcorn	United States	Traditional Animation
Room and Board	United States	Traditional Animation
Saddle Soap Opera	United States	Traditional Animation
Strange on the Range	United States	Traditional Animation
Self Service	Italy	Traditional Animation
Shapoklyak	Soviet Union	Traditional Animation
Sisyphus	Hungary	Hand-Painted Animation
Trail of the Lonesome Pink	United States	Traditional Animation
Voyage to Next	United States	Traditional Animation
Who Are We?	Canada	Traditional Animation
Winnie the Pooh and Tigger Too	United States	Traditional Animation
Yes Virginia, There Is a Santa Claus	United States	Traditional Animation

== 1975 ==
Name	Country	Technique
Alcohol: Pink Elephant	United States	Traditional Animation
Be My Valentine, Charlie Brown	United States	Traditional Animation
Bobolink Pink	United States	Traditional Animation
The Christmas Messenger	Canada	Traditional Animation
Conejín	Venezuela	Traditional Animation
Eagle Beagles	United States	Traditional Animation
The Energy Carol	Canada	Traditional Animation
The First Christmas: The Story of the First Christmas Snow	United States	Stop-motion Animation
Forty Pink Winks	United States	Traditional Animation
From Nags to Riches	United States	Traditional Animation
Goldilox & the Three Hoods	United States	Traditional Animation
Great	United Kingdom	Traditional Animation
Great Mazinger vs. Getter Robo	Japan	Traditional Animation
Great Mazinger vs. Getter Robo G: Kuchu Daigekitotsu	Japan	Traditional Animation
Haunting Dog	United States	Traditional Animation
The Heart That Changed Color	United States	Traditional Animation
Hedgehog in the Fog	Soviet Union	Cutout/stop-motion
The Hoober-Bloob Highway	United States	Traditional Animation
I Think Life's Great Fun	Hungary	Traditional Animation
In the Port	Soviet Union	Traditional Animation
It's Pink But Is It Mink?	United States	Traditional Animation
Keep Our Forests Pink	United States	Traditional Animation
Kick Me	United States	Drawn-on-film Animation
The Little Mermaid	Canada	Traditional Animation
M-O-N-E-Y Spells Love	United States	Traditional Animation
Monsieur Pointu	Canada	Stop-motion Animation
An Old Box	Canada	Traditional Animation
Pink Campaign	United States	Traditional Animation
Pink DaVinci	United States	Traditional Animation
Pink Elephant	United States	Traditional Animation
Pink Plasma	United States	Traditional Animation
Pink Streaker	United States	Traditional Animation
Quasi at the Quackadero	United States	Traditional Animation
Rabbit Habit	United States	Traditional Animation
The Remarkable Rocket	Canada	Traditional Animation
Rikki-Tikki-Tavi	United States	Traditional Animation
Rock-A-Bye Maybe	United States	Traditional Animation
Rockhounds	United States	Traditional Animation
Sagan om Karl-Bertil Jonssons julafton	Sweden	Traditional Animation
Salmon Pink	United States	Traditional Animation
Saltwater Tuffy	United States	Traditional Animation
The Scarlet Pinkernel	United States	Traditional Animation
Seven Little Flames	Yugoslavia	Traditional Animation
The Tiny Tree	United States	Traditional Animation
Uchu Enban Daisenso	Japan	Traditional Animation
Watch the Birdie	United States	Traditional Animation
Wolf and Seven Kids in a New Way	Soviet Union	Claymation
The White Seal	United States	Traditional Animation
Yankee Doodle Cricket	United States	Traditional Animation
You're a Good Sport, Charlie Brown	United States	Traditional Animation

== 1976 ==
Name	Country	Technique
About Dressy Sally	Czechoslovakia	Cutout Animation
Blue Puppy	Soviet Union	Traditional Animation
Bugs and Daffy's Carnival of the Animals	United States	Traditional Animation
The First Easter Rabbit	United States	Traditional Animation
Freedom Is	United States	Traditional Animation
Frosty's Winter Wonderland	United States	Traditional Animation
Grendizer, Getter Robo G, Great Mazinger: Kessen! Daikaijuu	Japan	Traditional Animation
Hey, You!	Hungary	Traditional Animation
Horse in the House	Hungary	Traditional Animation
It's Arbor Day, Charlie Brown	United States	Traditional Animation
Noah's Animals	United States	Traditional Animation
Leisure	Australia	Cutout Animation
The Little Drummer Boy, Book II	United States	Stop-motion Animation
Medicur	United States	Traditional Animation
Mindscape (Le Paysagiste)	Canada	Traditional Animation
Mowgli's Brothers	United States	Traditional Animation
Mystic Pink	United States	Traditional Animation
People, People, People	United States	Traditional Animation
The Pink of Arabee	United States	Traditional Animation
Pink Piper	United States	Traditional Animation
The Pink Pro	United States	Traditional Animation
Pinky Doodle	United States	Traditional Animation
Rocky Pink	United States	Traditional Animation
Scenes with Beans	Hungary	Stop-motion Animation
Sherlock Pink	United States	Traditional Animation
Silent Night, Holy Night	Australia	Traditional Animation
Sooper Goop	United States	Traditional Animation
The Street	Canada	Hand-Painted Animation
UFO Robot Grendizer vs. Great Mazinger	Japan	Traditional Animation
Zhang Zai Wu Li De Zhu Sun	China	Hand-Painted Animation

== 1977 ==
Name	Country	Technique
Bead Game	Canada	Stop-motion Animation
Bugs Bunny in Space	United States	Traditional Animation
Bugs Bunny's Howl-oween Special	United States	Traditional Animation
Castle of Otranto	Czechoslovakia	Live-action/stop-motion
A Cosmic Christmas	Canada	Traditional Animation
David	Canada	Traditional Animation
Deep Threat	Canada	Traditional Animation
A Doonesbury Special	United States	Traditional Animation
Down and Out	United Kingdom	Stop-motion Animation
The Easter Bunny Is Comin' to Town	United States	Stop-motion Animation
Energy: A National Issue	United States	Traditional Animation
The Fourth King	United States, Italy	Traditional Animation
Furies	United States	Traditional Animation
Halloween Is Grinch Night	United States	Traditional Animation
Hot to Trot	Australia	Traditional Animation
It's Your First Kiss, Charlie Brown	United States	Traditional Animation
Jimmy the C	United States	Stop-motion Animation
The Killing of an Egg	Netherlands	Traditional Animation
King of the Beasts	United States	Traditional Animation
Lucas, the Ear of Corn	United States	Traditional Animation
The Metamorphosis of Mr. Samsa	Canada	Sand
Nestor, the Long-Eared Christmas Donkey	United States	Stop-motion Animation
Oh, Sure	Canada	Traditional Animation
The Sand Castle	Canada	Sand
Sougen no Ko Tenguri	Japan	Traditional Animation
Spinnolio	Canada	Traditional Animation
The Stone Flower	Soviet Union	Stop-motion Animation
Striptease	Italy	Traditional Animation
The Struggle	Hungary	Traditional Animation
Therapeutic Pink	United States	Traditional Animation
Wakusei Robo Danguard Ace tai Konchu Robo Gundan	Japan	Traditional Animation
Why the Bears Dance on Christmas Eve	United States	Traditional Animation

== 1978 ==
Name	Country	Technique
Afterlife	Canada	Traditional Animation
All Nothing	Canada	Traditional Animation
Baby Story	Italy	Traditional Animation
Blowhard	Canada	Traditional Animation
Candy Candy: Candy no Natsu Yasumi	Japan	Traditional Animation
Candy Candy: Haru no Yobigoe	Japan	Traditional Animation
Cat and the Pinkstalk	United States	Traditional Animation
Confessions of a Foyer Girl	United Kingdom	Stop-motion Animation
A Connecticut Rabbit in King Arthur's Court	United States	Traditional Animation
Contact	Soviet Union	Traditional Animation
The Devil and Daniel Mouse	Canada	Traditional Animation
Dietetic Pink	United States	Traditional Animation
Doctor Pink	United States	Traditional Animation
The Fox and the Hunter	China	Cutout Animation
How Bugs Bunny Won the West	United States	Traditional Animation
Ikkyū-san to Yancha Hime	Japan	Traditional Animation
The Little Brown Burro	Canada	Traditional Animation
Oh My Darling	Netherlands	Traditional Animation
Ograblenie po...	Soviet Union	Traditional Animation
The Oriental Nightfish	United Kingdom	Traditional Animation
Pet Pink Pebbles	United States	Traditional Animation
Pink and Shovel	United States	Traditional Animation
Pink Arcade	United States	Traditional Animation
Pink Bananas	United States	Traditional Animation
Pink Breakfast	United States	Traditional Animation
Pink Daddy	United States	Traditional Animation
Pink in the Drink	United States	Traditional Animation
Pink in the Woods	United States	Traditional Animation
Pink Lemonade	United States	Traditional Animation
Pink Lightning	United States	Traditional Animation
The Pink of Bagdad	United States	Traditional Animation
The Pink Panther in: A Pink Christmas	United States	Traditional Animation
Pink Pictures	United States	Traditional Animation
Pink Press	United States	Traditional Animation
Pink Pull	United States	Traditional Animation
Pink Quackers	United States	Traditional Animation
Pink Suds	United States	Traditional Animation
Pink S.W.A.T.	United States	Traditional Animation
Pink Trumpet	United States	Traditional Animation
Pink U.F.O.	United States	Traditional Animation
Pink Z-Z-Z	United States	Traditional Animation
Pinkologist	United States	Traditional Animation
Pinktails for Two	United States	Traditional Animation
Puff the Magic Dragon	United States	Traditional Animation
The Puppy Who Wanted a Boy	United States	Traditional Animation
Raggedy Ann and Andy in The Great Santa Claus Caper	United States	Traditional Animation
Rip Van Winkle	United States	Stop-motion Animation
Rowing Across the Atlantic	France	Traditional Animation
Satiemania	Yugoslavia	Traditional Animation
The Small One	United States	Traditional Animation
Special Delivery	Canada	Traditional Animation
A Special Valentine with the Family Circus	United States	Traditional Animation
Spark Plug Pink	United States	Traditional Animation
Sprinkle Me Pink	United States	Traditional Animation
Star Pink	United States	Traditional Animation
String Along in Pink	United States	Traditional Animation
Supermarket Pink	United States	Traditional Animation
Three from Prostokvashino	Soviet Union	Traditional Animation
Tooth Brushing	United States	Traditional Animation
Toro Pink	United States	Traditional Animation
Wakusei Robo Danguard Ace: Uchū Daikaisen	Japan	Traditional Animation
What a Nightmare, Charlie Brown!	United States	Traditional Animation
Why Me?	Canada	Traditional Animation
Yankee Doodle Pink	United States	Traditional Animation
The Youth Who Wanted to Shiver	United States	Traditional Animation

== 1979 ==
Name	Country	Technique
Asparagus	United States	Traditional Animation
Banjo the Woodpile Cat	United States	Traditional Animation
The Berenstain Bears' Christmas Tree	United States	Traditional Animation
The Bugs Bunny Mother's Day Special	United States	Traditional Animation
Bugs Bunny's Christmas Carol	United States	Traditional Animation
Bugs Bunny's Looney Christmas Tales	United States	Traditional Animation
Bugs Bunny's Thanksgiving Diet	United States	Traditional Animation
Bugs Bunny's Valentine Special	United States	Traditional Animation
Caninabis	Canada	Traditional Animation
Casper's First Christmas	United States	Traditional Animation
Casper's Halloween Special	United States	Traditional Animation
Ci Wei Bei Xi Gua	China	Traditional Animation
Cinderella	Soviet Union	Traditional Animation
Clean the Air	United States	Traditional Animation
Dream Doll	United Kingdom, Yugoslavia	Traditional Animation
Every Child	Canada	Traditional Animation
Elbowing	Canada	Traditional Animation
A Family Circus Christmas	United States	Traditional Animation
The Fire-Fairy	Soviet Union	Traditional Animation
Free Radicals	United States	Experimental
The Fright Before Christmas	United States	Traditional Animation
Getting Started	Canada	Traditional Animation
A Girl and a Dolphin	Soviet Union	Traditional Animation
The Good Cat Mimi	China	Traditional Animation
Harpya	Belgium	Live-action/stop-motion
The Incredible Detectives	United States	Traditional Animation
Intergalactic Thanksgiving	Canada	Traditional Animation
It's So Nice to Have a Wolf Around the House	United States	Traditional Animation
John Law and the Mississippi Bubble	Canada	Traditional Animation
Lady and the Lamp	United States	Traditional Animation
The Little Rascals Christmas Special	United States	Traditional Animation
The Log Driver's Waltz	Canada	Traditional Animation
Miao Wu Shi Shui Jiao De?	China	Stop-motion Animation
Miss Nelson is Missing!	United States	Traditional Animation
Mu ji ban jia	China	Traditional Animation
The New Misadventures of Ichabod Crane	Canada	Traditional Animation
The Popeye Valentine Special: Sweethearts at Sea	United States	Traditional Animation
Puff the Magic Dragon in the Land of the Living Lies	United States	Traditional Animation
The Puppy's Great Adventure	United States	Traditional Animation
Raggedy Ann and Andy in The Pumpkin Who Couldn't Smile	United States	Traditional Animation
Romie-0 and Julie-8	Canada	Traditional Animation
SF Saiyuki Starzinger	Japan	Traditional Animation
Stalk of the Celery Monster	United States	Traditional Animation
Tale of Tales	Soviet Union	Cutout/stop-motion
Tian cai za ji yan yuan	China	Stop-motion Animation
Two Breaths to...	United States	Traditional Animation
Tukiki and His Search for a Merry Christmas	Canada	Traditional Animation
Unico: Black Cloud, White Feather	Japan	Traditional Animation
Very Blue Beard	Soviet Union	Traditional Animation
The Witch Who Was Afraid of Witches	United States	Traditional Animation
You're the Greatest, Charlie Brown	United States	Traditional Animation
Yu ren mai xie	China	Traditional Animation
