= The Ant and the Aardvark =

Series of theatrical short cartoons

- DePatie-Freleng Enterprises characters
- First appearance: "The Ant and the Aardvark" (1969)
- Created by: John W. Dunn
- Voiced by: John Byner (1969–1971, 1993–1995); Kel Mitchell (Ant; 2010); John Over (Aardvark; 2010); Eddie Garvar (Aardvark; 2010)

In-universe information
- Species: Ant and Aardvark
- Gender: Males

The Ant and the Aardvark is a series of 17 theatrical short cartoons produced at DePatie–Freleng Enterprises and released by United Artists from 1969 to 1971.

== Plot ==
The cartoon series follows attempts of a blue aardvark (voiced by John Byner, imitating Jackie Mason) attempting to catch and eat a red ant named Charlie (also voiced by Byner, imitating Dean Martin), usually doing so by inhaling with a loud vacuum cleaner sound. The aardvark character is essentially unnamed; in the episode "Rough Brunch", he claims his name is simply "Aardvark". Despite this, and his identification in the series title as an aardvark, in many of the shorts he refers to himself (and is referred to by the ant) as an anteater. The ant gives his nemesis a variety of names as sly terms of endearment (Ol' Sam, Ol' Ben, Ol' Blue, Claude, Pal, Buddy, Daddy-O). In several bumper sequences of The Pink Panther Show, he is called "Blue Aardvark".

== Production ==
The Ant and the Aardvark series was originally released by United Artists. Seventeen theatrical shorts were produced in the original series, and were subsequently featured in various television syndication packages, usually shown with DFE's other characters such as the Pink Panther and The Inspector. Most of the 17 entries appear in their television syndication form (complete with an audible laugh track added by NBC-TV) on the video on demand service Amazon Video.

When The Ant and the Aardvark first appeared on The New Pink Panther Show in the fall of 1971, the series became wildly popular, so much in fact that the duo became a featured part of the NBC series. Even though the 17 entries remained popular throughout the broadcast run of The Pink Panther Show, no new entries were produced.

The series used several unique production techniques for the period. The aardvark's body was solid blue: his only clothes—a pair of blue shorts and matching T-shirt—were a matching blue. Similarly, Charlie Ant was solid red, and did not sport any clothing. As such, the character's solid colors allowed them to stand out clearly against the multi-colored backgrounds featured prominently in the series. Charlie also sported half-closed eyes, as a sign of a bon vivant.

Musical director Doug Goodwin was responsible for the jazzy music score. Goodwin assembled an established group of jazz session musicians to perform the series' theme music and musical cues. For the first time in animated cartoons, all six musicians—Ray Brown, Billy Byers, Pete Candoli, Shelly Manne, Jimmy Rowles and Tommy Tedesco—received on-screen credit.

Art Leonardi was responsible for the main title graphic for all DePatie-Freleng entries. For The Ant and the Aardvark series, Leonardi expanded on a technique first introduced for the first Pink Panther cartoon, The Pink Phink. This entailed tearing paper into the forms of objects and characters to form stylized images.

== Additional characters ==
There were additional minor characters in the series. Among them were the following: (all voiced by John Byner unless otherwise noted)

- "Computer" – a talking device purported to be a supercomputer, which the Aardvark builds to help come up with ideas to catch Charlie; however, all these ideas fail, which turns out to be because the "computer" is not really a computer, but an automatic toaster. Its voice is an imitation of a young Paul Lynde. (Technology, Phooey)
- Cousin Term the Termite (Rough Brunch) - Charlie's wood-devouring cousin, who is trying to stay on a diet despite his cravings.
- Aunt Minerva – one of the Gi-ants and Charlie's aunt. (The Ant From Uncle)
- Tiny the Elephant, an ape, and a look-alike of Roland (from another DePatie-Freleng series, Roland and Rattfink) – Charlie Ant's lodge brothers (Mumbo Jumbo)
- An unnamed Green Ardvark – he is similar to the Blue Aardvark except barrel-chested instead of pot-bellied. He appears in I've Got Ants In My Plans and Odd Ant Out (in the latter, he is depicted wearing a cap); the first cartoon sees the two aardvarks squaring off over who gets to eat Charlie, while the second sees them battle over a can of chocolate-covered ants which Charlie is covered in.
- Tiger (voiced by Marvin Miller) – a large tiger who protects Charlie from the Aardvark as a favor for pulling a thorn from his foot. (Scratch a Tiger)
- A scientist with a Boris Karloff-like voice that studies about Charlie (Science Friction)
- A nurse at an animal hospital (voiced by Athena Lorde) – she tended to the ant and the aardvark when they ended up in her hospital (From Bed to Worse)
- An anteater-eating shark (Isle of Caprice)
- A nearsighted lifeguard – despite wearing glasses, he tends to mistake the Aardvark for a dog (Dune Bug)
- A toastmaster ant – who gives a toast at an ant dinner event (I've Got Ants in My Plans)

== International versions ==
- In the German dub, the Aardvark is a female anteater named Elise (Eliza) voiced by Marianne Wischmann while Charlie (voiced by Fred Maire) remains male. The cartoons are known under the title Die blaue Elise ("The Blue Eliza").
- In the Latin American Spanish dub, the Aardvark is a male anteater voiced by Pedro D'Aguillón (original dub) and Javier Rivero (dub on some re-airings). Charlie (voiced by Álvaro Carcaño and Salvador Nájar) remains unchanged. The series title is La hormiga y el oso hormiguero ("The Ant and the Anteater").
- In the Brazilian Portuguese dub the Aardvark is an anteater voiced by Ionei Silva. The series title is changed to A Formiga e o Tamanduá ("The Ant and the Anteater").
- In the European Portuguese dub the aardvark remains an aardvark.
- In the French dub, the Aardvark is a male anteater voiced by Michel Gatineau while Charlie is voiced by actress Marcelle Lajeunesse. The title is known as Tamanoir et Fourmi Rouge ("Aardvark and Red Ant").

== Filmography ==
All voices provided by John Byner unless otherwise noted.

No.	Title	Directed by	Story by	Original release date
1	The Ant and the Aardvark	Friz Freleng	John W. Dunn	March 5, 1969
The Ant spots a picnic and goes there to collect some food. The Aardvark shows up and wants a picnic of his own... with the Ant on the menu.
2	Hasty But Tasty	Gerry Chiniquy	John W. Dunn	March 6, 1969
Among various tricks to catch the motorcycle-riding Ant, the Aardvark uses "Instant Hole". Naturally, it backfires on him, along with his other tricks.
3	The Ant from Uncle	George Gordon	John W. Dunn	April 2, 1969
The Ant is worn out and thinking of retiring, so the Aardvark invites him to a "Relaxation Club"... located in the Aardvark's stomach.
4	I've Got Ants in My Plans	Gerry Chiniquy	John W. Dunn	May 14, 1969
The Blue Aardvark is up against another aardvark, the Green Aardvark, to see who gets to eat the Ant.
5	Technology, Phooey	Gerry Chiniquy	Irv Spector	June 25, 1969
The Aardvark builds a computer to help him try to catch the Ant, but the computer's advice does not do the Aardvark much good.
6	Never Bug an Ant	Gerry Chiniquy	David Detiege	September 12, 1969
The Aardvark tries to use his vacuum-inhaling trick to have the Ant for lunch.
7	Dune Bug	Art Davis	John W. Dunn	October 27, 1969
The Aardvark finds the Ant at a beach and tries to catch the Ant like always; however, he must get past the nearsighted lifeguard, who believes he is a dog and will not allow him on the beach.
8	Isle of Caprice	Gerry Chiniquy	David Detiege	December 18, 1969
The Aardvark is marooned on a deserted island, with another island full of ants in the distance. He tries to get to the other island by any means possible, but a hungry shark has other ideas.
9	Scratch a Tiger	Hawley Pratt	Irv Spector	January 28, 1970
A tiger who owes the Ant a favor is tasked with keeping him and his fellow ants safe from the Aardvark.: Additional voices: Marvin Miller
10	Odd Ant Out	Gerry Chiniquy	Sid Marcus	April 28, 1970
The Blue Aardvark and the Green Aardvark battle again, this time for who gets a can of chocolate-covered ants... if either one can get it open.
11	Ants in the Pantry	Hawley Pratt	John W. Dunn	June 10, 1970
The Aardvark overhears an exterminator taking a job to catching ants. Taking the exterminator's place, the Aardvark tries to get rid of the Ant by, like always, trying to make him his meal.
12	Science Friction	Gerry Chiniquy	Larz Bourne	June 28, 1970
A scientist is trying to study the Ant; meanwhile, the Aardvark attempts to eat the Ant yet again, but the scientist continually intervenes, refusing to let the Aardvark ruin his experiments.
13	Mumbo Jumbo	Art Davis	John W. Dunn	September 27, 1970
The Ant has become a member of the Brothers of the Forest, Lodge 202, whose members will always come to one another's aid when needed. Naturally, the Ant's lodge brothers, especially his close friend Tiny the elephant, arrive on call to save him from being eaten by the Aardvark.
14	The Froze Nose Knows	Gerry Chiniquy	Dale Hale	November 18, 1970
A very heavy snowstorm hits the forest, forcing the Aardvark to use winter-themed tactics to catch and eat the Ant.
15	Don't Hustle an Ant with Muscle	Art Davis	Dale Hale	December 27, 1970
The Ant discovers a jar of vitamin strength pills that give him both larger, stronger muscles and the upper hand against the Aardvark.
16	Rough Brunch	Art Davis	Sid Marcus	January 3, 1971
The Ant is visiting his cousin Term, - a termite - when the Aardvark shows up, yet again, to try and eat the Ant. Term comes to his cousin's aid by using his talent of eating wood to thwart the hungry Aardvark.
17	From Bed to Worse	Art Davis	John W. Dunn	June 16, 1971
As the end result of yet another chase, both the Aardvark and the Ant get broken legs, so they are put in an animal hospital, but even being hospitalized won't stop the Aardvark from trying to have the Ant for lunch.: Additional voices: Athena Lorde

== Credits ==
- Producers: David H. DePatie, Friz Freleng
- Directors: Friz Freleng, Hawley Pratt, Gerry Chiniquy, Art Davis
- Story: John W. Dunn, Irv Spector, Dave Detiege, Sid Marcus, Larz Bourne, Dale Hale
- Animation: Warren Batchelder, Manny Gould, Manny Perez, Don Williams, Art Leonardi, Robert Taylor, Bob Goe, Tom Ray, Lloyd Vaughan, Bob Richardson, John Gibbs, Phil Roman, Robert Bentley, Kenneth Muse, Irv Spence
- Graphic Designers: Corny Cole, Dick Ung, Al Wilson, Lin Larsen
- Voices: John Byner, Marvin Miller, Athena Lorde
- Color Designer: Tom O'Laughlin, Richard H. Thomas
- Title Cards: Art Leonardi
- Production Supervisor: Jim Foss
- Coordinator: Harry Love
- Camera: John Burton Jr.
- Film Editor: Lee Gunther
- Musical Director: Doug Goodwin
- Musicians:
  - Ray Brown - bass
  - Billy Byers - trombone
  - Pete Candoli - trumpet
  - Jimmy Rowles - piano
  - Tommy Tedesco - guitar/banjo
  - Shelly Manne - drums

== Revivals ==
The first revival featured the characters as part on the 1993 incarnation of The Pink Panther. The characters remained unchanged, though unlike the original 1969-1971 cartoons, they do not appear in their own segments but rather are included in segments featuring the Pink Panther (now voiced by Matt Frewer). John Byner returned to voice both Charlie Ant and the Aardvark.

The second revival occurred in 2010 as part of Pink Panther and Pals. Eddie Garvar (originally John Over for the 9 episodes only) voices the Aardvark, who retains his previous characterization. Kel Mitchell, using his natural voice, voices the Ant.
