= The Pink Blueprint =

- Title card
- Directed by: Hawley Pratt
- Story by: John Dunn
- Produced by: David H. DePatie; Friz Freleng; Bill Orcutt (production supervision)
- Edited by: Chuck McCann
- Music by: Theme music: Henry Mancini; Score: William Lava
- Animation by: Warren Batchelder; Don Williams; Norm McCabe; Dale Case; Laverne Harding
- Layouts by: Dick Ung
- Backgrounds by: Tom O'Loughlin
- Color process: Deluxe
- Production companies: The Mirisch Company; Animation: Mirisch-Geoffrey-DePatie-Freleng Productions
- Distributed by: United Artists
- Release date: May 25, 1966
- Running time: 6:24
- Country: United States
- Language: Silent

The Pink Blueprint is a 1966 American animated short film, the 18th cartoon produced in the Pink Panther series.

In the film, the Pink Panther and the "Little Man" are arguing over their respective designs for a house being built. The Man uses blueprints with blue overtones and favors traditional designs, while the Panther uses a "pinkprint" and favors futuristic architectural styles. The result is a boringly-designed house with a fancy-looking pink "facade" (false-front wall)

== Plot ==
A building contractor (the "Little Man") arrives on the site of a house being built. The Pink Panther emerges from inside a barrel on the site and sees the house's blueprints. The design has blue overtones and a more traditional "milk carton" shape; disgusted by the insipidly-boring design on the blueprint, the Panther swaps it out for a "pinkprint", which, conversely, depicts a "space age" house that is futuristically rounded, sleek, and all pink, before sinking back into the barrel. Upon coming across the pink version of the blueprint, the contractor simply crumples it up and tosses it aside before continuing onward with his job. In response, the Pink Panther decides that if anyone will build his dream home, it will have to be himself.

The Pink Panther, continually eluding the sight of the contractor, begins working on the site himself, causing mishap after mishap to befall the contractor all the while in a series of gags. Ultimately, the Panther's deeds are finally exposed to the contractor, who furiously gives chase. Pink takes refuge in a paint shed, and the contractor boards up the door to ensure no further interference.

Inside the shed, the Pink Panther finds a bucket of blue stain, giving him an idea; he dips his "pinkprint" into the bucket to dye it blue. Reaching out through a hole in the shed door, the Panther swaps out the original blueprint in the contractor's pocket for his own. Upon returning to the site and seeing the blueprint he now has, the contractor immediately gets to work, and, when all is said and done, the house is finally finished, and he drives away contently. As the Pink Panther tunnels out from the ground through the shed, he is delighted to see what appears to be the outlandish house he wanted, but as he runs inside, it is revealed to really be the boringly-designed house the contractor was going to build, with a fancy-looking pink "facade" (false-front wall) loosely tacked onto the front for disguise.

== Notes ==
- The concept of substituting a pink version of something for the original color was borrowed from The Pink Phink, wherein the Little Man is trying to paint a house blue but the Panther prefers pink paint. Both The Pink Blueprint and The Pink Phink were nominated for an Academy Award for Best Animated Short Film, with the latter winning.
- Footage from The Pink Blueprint would be reused as a flashback in the made-for-television entry Pinkologist, wherein the Little Man goes to see a shrink because he is going insane from the Panther's frequent and infuriating interference in his life over the past years. Pink Posies also utilizes this same replacing-another-color-with-pink concept, wherein the Panther secretly pulls up all of the yellow flowers that the Little Man plants and replaces them with identically shaped pink flowers, initially causing the gardener to question his own eyesight, health, and sanity; he later becomes maniacally frustrated when pink flowers continue to appear no matter what he does, and so when he eventually does catch sight of the mischievous feline and realizes that Pinky is the true cause of the flower-color-changing problem, the enraged gardener ferociously pursues Pinky around the yard with his riding lawnmower.
- The Pink Panther Show contained a laugh track when the Pink Panther cartoons were broadcast on NBC-TV. When MGM released all 124 Pink Panther cartoons on DVD in 2006, the theatrical versions were, for the most part, utilized. However, several television prints made their way onto the DVD set, The Pink Blueprint being one of them.
- This was the first Pink Panther short film to air on television, on NBC, on September 6, 1969.

== See also ==
- List of American films of 1966
- List of The Pink Panther cartoons

== Further sources ==
- Meet the Pink Panther; by Hope Freleng and Sybil Freleng , (Universe Publishing, 2005).
- The Pink Panther Classic Cartoon Collection (2006). [DVD set]. New York: MGM Home Video.
- DePatie-Freleng website
