= DePatie =

DePatie is a surname. Notable people with the surname include:

- David H. DePatie (1929–2021), American film and television producer, son of Edmond
  - DePatie–Freleng Enterprises, an American animation production company
- Edmond L. DePatie (1900–1966), American film industry executive
