= The Pink Panther (TV series) =

American animated television series

- Also known as: The New Pink Panther Show
- Genre: Comedy; Fantasy; Slapstick; Animation; Musical
- Based on: The Pink Panther by: Friz Freleng; David H. DePatie
- Directed by: Charles Grosvenor; Byron Vaughns; Kelly Ward (voice director)
- Starring: Matt Frewer as The Pink Panther
- Voices of: Sheryl Bernstein; John Byner; Dan Castellaneta; Jim Cummings; Brian George; Jess Harnell; Joe Piscopo; Hal Rayle; Charles Nelson Reilly; Wallace Shawn; Kath Soucie; Jo Anne Worley; Kenneth Mars
- Theme music composer: Henry Mancini (arranged by Eddie Arkin)
- Composers: Eddie Arkin; Albert Olson; James Stemple; Mark Watters
- Country of origin: United States
- Original language: English
- No. of seasons: 2
- No. of episodes: 60 (121 segments)

Production
- Executive producers: Walter Mirisch; Marvin Mirisch; Paul Sabella; Mark Young; Jonathan Dern (season 2); Kelly Ward (season 2)
- Producers: Charles Grosvenor; Byron Vaughns
- Running time: 22 minutes
- Production company: Metro-Goldwyn-Mayer Animation

Original release
- Network: Syndication
- Release: September 13, 1993 – April 12, 1995

Related
- Pink Panther and Sons; Pink Panther and Pals

The Pink Panther (also known as The New Pink Panther Show) is an American animated television series based on the original theatrical cartoons of the same name produced by Metro-Goldwyn-Mayer Animation in association with Mirisch-Geoffrey-DePatie-Freleng, and distributed in the US through Claster Television (by TV distribution) and Camelot Entertainment Sales (by barter services).

The series centers on the Pink Panther and his co-stars from the original cartoon shorts in a series of brand-new stories. Unlike other animated series in the franchise, this is the only series where he and the Little Man speak numerous lines; prior to this series, the Panther had only briefly spoken in two cartoons in the 1960s.

The Pink Panther was nominated for a Daytime Emmy Award in 1994 for Outstanding Achievement in Music Direction and Composition. The series also served as the basis for two educational adventure computer games: The Pink Panther: Passport to Peril, and The Pink Panther: Hokus Pokus Pink.

== Premise ==
The Pink Panther stars the Pink Panther in a series of adventures in which he deals with different situations in a manner similar in style to Hanna-Barbera cartoons and Looney Tunes shorts, ranging from modern-day situations such as working as a delivery boy to outlandish situations like living in caveman days. Unlike previous television series and almost the entire theatrical run, the series was produced with the Panther capable of speaking throughout the episodes, to allow more interaction with other characters. Voiced by Matt Frewer, he is given a humorous American accent in order to appeal to younger children, which was in sharp contrast to the sophisticated British accent supplied by impressionist Rich Little, who voiced the Panther briefly in two 1965 cartoon shorts, Sink Pink and Pink Ice.

Alongside the Pink Panther, other characters from theatrical shorts produced by DePatie-Freleng Enterprises appear in the series, including: the Inspector, whom the Panther assists in the guise of an American police officer; the Ant and the Aardvark, with John Byner reprising the role of both characters; the Dogfather and his two main henchmen Pugg and Louie, who were radically reinterpreted for this series as more original characters; the Muscle Man from the 1968 cartoon Come On In! The Water's Pink; the Witch from the 1969 cartoon Pink-A-Rella; and "the Little Man", who, like the Panther, was also designed to speak in the series, with Wallace Shawn providing his voice. The series also features new characters, including a mask-wearing tribal witch doctor named Voodoo Man, a little red-headed girl named Thelma, and a kindly elderly woman named Mrs. Chubalingo and her pet parrot Jules.

== Cast ==
- Matt Frewer as the Pink Panther, the Whistler (ep. 5), News Anchor (ep. 59)
- Sheryl Bernstein as Eskimo Mayor
- John Byner as Aardvark, Ant
- Dan Castellaneta as Voodoo Man, Muck Luck, Chef Sumo (ep. 17), Fish World Ticket Man (ep. 31), Weasel, Snake (ep. 16), Babe the Bull (ep. 33)
- Brian George as Pugg
- Jess Harnell as Louie, Muscle Man, Pecks (ep. 59)
- Joe Piscopo as the Dogfather
- Hal Rayle as the Inspector
- Charles Nelson Reilly as Jules Parrot
- Wallace Shawn as the Little Man
- Kath Soucie as Thelma, Cleopatra (ep. 3)
- Jo Anne Worley as Mrs. Chubalingo

=== Additional cast ===
- Jim Cummings as Rolo (ep. 31), the Dogfather (ep. 51, "It's Just a Gypsy in My Soup")
- Ruth Buzzi as Witch
- Hamilton Camp as Rupert (ep. 31)
- Jodi Carlisle
- Nancy Cartwright
- Cathy Cavadini as Thelma (ep. 2)
- Rickey D'Shon Collins as Lester (ep. 5)
- Troy Davidson
- Eddie Deezen as Robot (ep. 50)
- Mick Garris
- Phillip Glasser
- Barry Gordon as Bongo Cereal Founder (ep. 59)
- Paige Gosney
- Gerrit Graham
- Jennifer Hale
- Dana Hill
- David Lodge
- Maurice LaMarche as Spartacus (ep. 59)
- Steve MacKall as Johnny Chucklehead
- Danny Mann
- Kenneth Mars as Commissioner
- Kevin Michael Richardson as Erik the Red
- Bradley Pierce as Buddy Bimmel's Son (ep. 59)
- Gwen Shepherd
- Susan Silo
- Jean Smart
- Elmarie Wendel
- Thomas F. Wilson

== Production ==
In 1992, MGM/UA decided to produce new Pink Panther cartoons with a twist that he would be able to speak, hoping to bring new life to the panther. That same year, MGM/UA met with its licensees to explain the changes that were made to the character and arm them with essential artwork needed to spring the panther for the brand-new series. This decision was controversial and unpopular.

Initially, Mirisch-Geoffrey-DePatie-Freleng agreed with granted MGM the rights to produce 40 episodes. By July, 1993, the show had cleared 80% of the country.

=== Casting ===
In 1993, Rich Little, who voiced the character in a few scenes of the original cartoons, was approached to reprise his role as the pink feline. However, Little did not recall voicing the character at all and turned down the offer saying giving the panther a voice would ruin the character. Franchise co-creator David DePatie also felt that giving the panther a voice would "compromise the integrity of the character." But once the producers saw Matt Frewer fill in the lines for the panther, they thought it was fantastic and they accepted it.

== Episodes ==
=== Season 1 (1993) ===
No. overall	No. in season	Title	Original release date
1	1	"Pink, Pink & Away" "Down on the Antfarm"	September 13, 1993
"Pink, Pink & Away": Pink is inspired by his favorite superhero to stop the Dogfather's crime spree by crafting his own superhero persona: "Super-Pink". "Down on the Antfarm": Pink's experimental ant farm, complete with the Ant, is accidentally delivered to the Aardvark.
2	2	"Pink and Quiet" "The Pinky 500"	September 17, 1993
"Pink and Quiet": Pink is very tired and wants to sleep. As he and his pet goldfish, Finley, go to bed, one thing after another keeps him awake. "The Pinky 500": Pink buys a used car to compete against racing champion Clutch. However, the car is sentient and in love with another competitor's car.
3	3	"The Ghost and Mr. Panther" "Cleopanthra"	September 29, 1993
"The Ghost and Mr. Panther": Pink babysits Mrs. Chubalingo's parrot in her old house. The Dogfather, Pugg and Louie try to scare Pink by disguising themselves as ghosts, hoping to find jewels worth stealing, only to learn too late the parrot is named Jules. "Cleopanthra": In ancient Egypt, Pink tries to become a successful architect.
4	4	"Big Top Pinky" "Yeti 'Nother Bigfoot Story"	September 16, 1993
"Big Top Pinky": Pink dreams of stardom in the circus and discovers his calling as a clown. "Yeti 'Nother Bigfoot Story": After ruining a museum display, Pink, working as a custodian, travels to Alaska in search of Bigfoot.
5	5	"Pinky In Paradise" "Department Store Pinkerton"	September 14, 1993
"Pinky in Paradise": Aided by a voracious Jules the Parrot, Pink searches for buried treasure, only to come up against a territorial Voodoo Man with a bad attitude and a magical Voodoo staff. "Department Store Pinkerton": Pink, working as a department store security guard, searches for a mysterious robber.
6	6	"Moby Pink" "The Pink Stuff"	September 22, 1993
"Moby Pink": While trying to take a luxury cruise, Pink accidentally stows away on a broken-down fishing scow, captained by an obsessed old sailor searching for a "great off-white whale". "The Pink Stuff": Dr. Helmut Von Schmarty sends two astronauts, Pink and Avery Bravery, to Mars. While Avery Bravery starts planning the location of his Avery Aces Condominiums, Pink meets the locals.
7	7	"Pink Pizza" "The Pink Painter"	September 15, 1993
"Pink Pizza": Pink helps Granny, the owner of a ramshackle pizza parlor, to compete and eventually succeed against Big Eddie's, a high-tech, glitzy pizza conglomerate. "The Pink Painter": While Pink ties to get his artwork featured at a famous museum, the Dogfather plans a heist at the same museum.
8	8	"Werewolf in Panther's Clothing" "Pink Paparazzi"	September 24, 1993
"Werewolf in Panther's Clothing": Working as a dog-catcher, Pink encounters a werewolf in the village of Slyvarnia. The locals are all secretly vampires, while the "werewolf" is actually a human in disguise. "Pink Paparazzi": Pink tries to capture a "zillionaire" on tape and ends up capturing the Dogfather instead.
9	9	"Rock Me Pink" "Pinkus Pantherus"	September 23, 1993
"Rock Me Pink": Pink tries everything to get rock star Zync to hear his music. "Pinkus Pantherus": Pink joins the Roman Legion Army to protect a Roman princess.
10	10	"Pilgrim Panther" "That Old Pink Magic"	September 20, 1993
"Pilgrim Panther": While in pursuit of a wild turkey to serve for history's first Thanksgiving feast, Pink finds himself in competition with a local Native American. "That Old Pink Magic": While performing magic at a birthday party, Pink accidentally makes the birthday boy disappear and has to rescue him from a lonely, comical witch.
11	11	"Pink-anderthal Man" "Pink Kong"	September 21, 1993
"Pink-anderthal Man": A prehistoric Pink travels through time to find a cure for a headache. "Pink Kong": Pink takes a giant gorilla named Queen Kong to New York City so she can become a famous singer.
12	12	"The Magnificent Pink One" "Downhill Panther"	September 27, 1993
"The Magnificent Pink One": Pink accepts a job as a sheriff in a Wild West town and ends up having to protect it from the Baddie Brothers, a notorious outlaw gang. "Downhill Panther": Pink competes against a ski resort owner to decide who gets control of the mountain they both occupy.
13	13	"14 Karat Pink" "Robo-Pink"	September 28, 1993
"14 Karat Pink": During the California Gold Rush, both Pink and Wyatt Burp quit their jobs on Big Ben Wagonrite's Texas ranch to hunt for the Lalapalooza Gold Mine, but Big Ben is after the gold too. "Robo-Pink": Pink works as a security guard at Secret Stuff, Inc., and is saved from being smashed to death by a friendly robot named D.U.G. While Pink's boss, Mr. Neutron, chooses a new robot named XS-1000 as head of security, the Dogfather and his henchmen scheme to rob the company.
14	14	"Pink Encounters" "Junkyard Pink Blues"	September 30, 1993
"Pink Encounters": Pink accidentally hijacks a spaceship, whose owners are being held captive by Von Schmarty, and must help the aliens escape the laboratory. "Junkyard Pink Blues": Mrs. Chubalingo has lost her poodle, Foo-Fee. Pink agrees to find her for the reward. The Dogfather and his goons try to thwart Pink to enrich themselves.
15	15	"Pantherobics" "Pinkenstein"	October 4, 1993
"Pantherobics": Pinky trains to beat the champion of the Beefy Barbarian competition. "Pinkenstein": Pinky is hired by the mayor of Whispering Pines to trap mice, but the neighborhood witch continually distracts the Panther from doing his job.
16	16	"Pinky Rider" "Midnight Ride of Pink Revere"	October 7, 1993
"Pinky Rider": Pink opens his own delivery service, but finds himself and his pink moped not only in competition against delivery rival Big Lou and his monster truck but also running into trouble against Crusher and his motorcycle gang. "Midnight Ride of Pink Revere": During the American Revolutionary War, Pink wants to join the Minutemen, but the Minutemen's "best", Paul Revere, doesn't like the competition. When the British actually land and Revere gets knocked unconscious, Pink must defeat the invaders by himself.
17	17	"Pinky...He Delivers" "Super-Pink's Egg-cellent Adventure"	October 17, 1993
"Pinky...He Delivers": A modern version of Red Riding Hood hires Pink to deliver a package to her Grandmother, whose house happens to be located underwater. A Shark tries to steal the package. "Super-Pink's Egg-cellent Adventure": Pink and Von Schmarty must rescue the World's Largest Egg from a Sumo Chef, who wants to turn it into the World's Largest Bowl of Egg Drop Soup.
18	18	"Cowboy Pinky" "Stealth Panther"	October 6, 1993
"Cowboy Pinky": Pink helps to deliver Von Schmarty's daughter Heidi's three cows to San Francisco while the Dogfather and his henchmen try to steal them. "Stealth Panther": Pink goes on a spy mission to retrieve a stolen stealth jet.
19	19	"Pinkazuma's Revenge" "Pinky Down Under"	October 11, 1993
"Pinkazuma's Revenge": "Don Rosero Panthero" sails to the New World. Arriving in Central America, he is ordered by Captain Sanfernando to make contact with the local Aztec population - a task that puts him into conflict with Chief Monty Zuma. "Pinky Down Under": Pink runs an outpost in the Australian Outback. While boasting, he signs on as bush guide to city slickers Jackeroo Johnny and his partner Dingo, who are secretly out to catch the rare Pygmy Plaid Kangaroo.
20	20	"Pinkadoon" "A Camp-Pink We Will Go"	October 12, 1993
"Pinkadoon": In Morocco, taxi driver Pink's obsessive decorator fare is kidnapped and taken to the magical town of Pinkadoon to be married to the Sultan, and Pink must rescue her before the town vanishes for another hundred years. "A Camp-Pink We Will Go": Forest Ranger Pink has his paws full with two rambunctious roller-blading kids dumped on him by The Little Man.
21	21	"Icy Pink" "The End of Superpink?"	October 14, 1993
"Icy Pink": Pink travels to Alaska to help Eskimo Mukluk open an ice cream factory. "The End of Superpink?": Superpink faces competition in the form of Captain Chaos.
22	22	"All for Pink and Pink for All" "Service with a Pink Smile"	October 18, 1993
"All for Pink and Pink for All": Pink and his musketeer comrades, Aardvark and Ant, must save the Queen from the clutches of the evil Cardinal Richelieu. This segment features The Ant and the Aardvark "Service with a Pink Smile": In trying to impress a potential buyer for his hotel, the unscrupulous Boss Man forces Bellboy Pink to enter the wrestling ring with the vicious and malicious wrestler, Savage Hun.
23	23	"Trains, Pains and Panthers" "Wet and Wild Pinky"	October 19, 1993
"Trains, Pains and Panthers": Pink takes the automated Hover Train to get to his job interview, but the Dogfather and his henchmen hijack the train. "Wet and Wild Pinky": At a water park, Pink babysits his boss's niece to get a promotion.
24	24	"From Hair to Eternity" "Strike Flea, You're Out!"	October 20, 1993
"Hair to Eternity": Pink has to save the city when Von Schamrty's hair turns into a hair eating monster. "Strike Flea, You're Out!": An itchy flea makes Pink a baseball champion.
25	25	"Cinderpink" "It's a Bird! It's a Pain! It's Superfan!"	October 25, 1993
"Cinderpink": In an 18th century fairy tale setting, the Panther is a lowly servant for the Dogfather, until his fairy godfather helps him to attend King Von Schmarty's ball and expose the Dogfather as a thief. "It's a Bird! It's a Pain! It's Superfan!": Pink attends his favorite football team to help them win the Ultrabowl.
26	26	"Who's Smiling Now? (The Inspector)" "Rob'n Hoodwinked"	October 27, 1993
"Who's Smiling Now?": Pink and the Inspector investigate the case of the missing Mona Lisa. "Rob'n Hoodwinked": Pink joins up with the Dogfather, who's disguised himself as Robin Hood.
27	27	"Hook, Line and Pinker" "Valentine Pink"	October 29, 1993
"Hook, Line and Pinker": Pink encounters the Loch Ness Monster while fishing. "Valentine Pink": Pink accidentally launches three of Cupid's arrows across Fairy Tale Land.
28	28	"Dino Sour Head" "The Luck O' the Pinkish"	November 1, 1993
"Dino Sour Head": A prehistoric Pink must defend his village from a T-Rex. "The Luck O' the Pinkish": Pink encounters a leprechaun while looking for a four-leaf clover.
29	29	"The Inspector... NOT! (The Inspector)" "Pink Links"	November 5, 1993
"The Inspector... NOT!": The Inspector and Pink must catch a master of disguise at the Cheese Ball. "Pink Links":Pink ends up in the middle of a rivalry between two golf players and must recover his boss's solid gold putter.
30	30	"Stool Parrot (The Inspector)" "Pinky and Slusho"	November 4, 1993
"Stool Parrot": Pink and the Inspector have to protect a parrot who witnessed a crime. "Pinky and Slusho": Pink creates Slusho to help boost his snow-cone business.
31	31	"Panthergeist" "Pinky's Pending Pink Slip"	November 8, 1993
"Panthergeist": Pink is hired to get rid of a ghost inside a castle. "Pinky's Pending Pink Slip": Pink has to teach a troublesome student without breaking the rule of leaving school grounds, something his principal tries to catch him in the act of.
32	32	"The Three Pink Porkers" "The Heart of Pinkness"	November 9, 1993
"The Three Pink Porkers": A trio of troublesome pigs cause problems at Pink's bed and breakfast. "The Heart of Pinkness": Pink must protect the Ant from Varkzan. "The Heart of Pinkness" features The Ant and the Aardvark
33	33	"The Inspector's Most Wanted (The Inspector)" "Pinky Appleseed"	November 10, 1993
"The Inspector's Most Wanted": A criminal from the Inspector's past attempts to get revenge by having the Inspector star on a reality TV show. "Pinky Appleseed": Paul Bunyan interferes with Pink's attempts to re-plant a forest.
34	34	"Calling Dr. Panther" "For Those Who Pink Young"	November 15, 1993
"Calling Dr. Panther": After accidentally injuring his boss, Pink must save him from a mad scientist who wants to use his boss's brain. "For Those Who Pink Young": A package mix up results in Pink being shrunk down to child size.
35	35	"Lights, Camera, Voodoo" "I'm Dreaming of a Pink Christmas"	November 16, 1993
"Lights, Camera, Voodoo": While working as a security guard, Pink has to deal with a movie star, a movie director, and a movie fan. "I'm Dreaming of a Pink Christmas": Pink encounters a criminal and tries to make him see the meaning of Christmas by delivering a package, only for them to be repeatedly thwarted by a guard poodle.
36	36	"Wiener Takes All" "The Easter Panther""	November 18, 1993
"Wiener Takes All": The Pink Panther runs a successful hot dog business until the competition kidnaps the founding "granny." Also, Pinky has the Witch serve as a temporary substitute. "The Easter Panther": Pink is hired to handle the White House Easter Egg Hunt, but at the same time, he must also foil a heist by the Dogfather.
37	37	"The Inspector's Club (The Inspector)" "A Royal Pain"	November 22, 1993
"The Inspector's Club (The Inspector)": The Inspector puts his reputation on the line and accepts a challenge to solve the mystery of the lost city of Atlantis. "A Royal Pain": Pinky is an overworked bellhop who stands in for a visiting 10-year-old king at a King's Convention, and nearly starts World War III.
38	38	"Black & White & Pink All Over" "Beach Blanket Pinky"	November 23, 1993
"Black & White & Pink All Over": Thelma hires Pink, as a film noir detective, to find her doll, Rags, who was stolen by Pugg and taken back to the Dogfather's lair. Officer Big Nose hinders Pink's investigation. The episode is in black and white, except for Pink and a pale blue crane. "Beach Blanket Pinky": The Dogfather tries to selfishly monopolize the beach, but Pink and other beach-goers build a sandcastle to fight back.
39	39	"Digging for Dollars (The Inspector)" "Pinknocchio"	November 29, 1993
"Digging for Dollars": The Inspector falls for a beautiful bank robber in archeologist's clothing when she uses a tunnel beneath his house to pull off her latest heist at the last National Bank. "Pinknocchio": Pinky gets his puppet friend Pinknocchio to come to life, but the Dogfather tries to steal Pinknocchio.
40	40	"Pinky Up the River" "Long John Pinky"	November 30, 1993
"Pinky Up the River": The Panther opens a river rafting operation only to encounter unexpected competition from Manly Man and a couple of odd tourists who have plans to help the Dogfather take a little vacation from the Big House. "Long John Pink": The Pink Panther gets shanghaied to be the cook aboard a pirate ship.

=== Season 2 (1994–95) ===
No. overall	No. in season	Title	Original release date
41	1	"Muff the Magic Dragon" "Pink Thumb"	September 10, 1994
42	2	"Pinky's Dilemma" "Oh, Varkula"	September 17, 1994
"Pinky's Dilemma": Pinky's pen pal Queen Kong (a twelve foot ape) makes a surprise visit to the big city and his life is turned upside down when a vicious cyclone destroys her island, making it impossible for her to ever go home again. "Oh, Varkula": When Pinky spends the night at Castle Varkula, he must defend the Ant from the attacks of the vampire host, Count Varkula. This segment features The Ant and the Aardvark
43	3	"Ice Blue Pink" "Pink Trek"	September 24, 1994
"Ice Blue Pink": Pink discovers and releases his primitive ancestor the Blue Panther (who speaks his two lines with a British accent, likely a nod to Rich Little's work in two of the original Pink Panther theatrical shorts) from a block of ice, but bringing him back to civilization causes problems when an unscrupulous carnival owner catches sight of him. "Pink Trek": Galaxy-trekking starship commander Captain Pink gets some help from the Voodoo man in order to defeat the villainous bird the Merciless.
44	4	"The Legend of El Pinko" "Pink Big"	October 1, 1994
45	5	"Eric the Pink" "Pretty and Pink"	October 8, 1994
"Eric the Pink": In Viking times, the penniless Panther's only hope for experiencing a vacation sea cruise is to pose as Erik the Red and set sail with a crew of looters and plunderers. The Panther falls afoul of a jealous first mate intent on jettisoning him. "Pretty and Pink": A princess falls in love with a man who wants to steal the royal jewels and Pinky must stop him.
46	6	"Built for Speed" "The Pooch and The Panther"	October 15, 1994
"Built for Speed": While Pink and Rex Barklay compete for being car salesman of the month, Pink learns that Rex has a dark secret in order to make his car sales more successful. "The Pooch and the Panther": As a dog groomer, Pink has to take care of a dog who needs a new style, but the dog would rather run around the city while refusing to be groomed.
47	7	""Pinky in Toyland" "The Detective of Oz"	October 22, 1994
"Pinky in Toyland": As a witness to a bank heist, Pink evades robbers by pretending to be a brand new stuffed animal owned by a spoiled rich girl. "The Detective of Oz": In a spoof of The Wizard of Oz, Pink is a detective in Emerald City and has to help the Witch reclaim her stolen red slippers from Dorothy. However, there is more to this theft than meets the eye.
48	8	"Royal Canadian Mounted Panther" "Power of Pink"	October 29, 1994
49	9	"Lifestyles of the Pink and Famous" "Happy Trails Pinky"	November 5, 1994
"Lifestyles of the Pink and Famous": When the country club valet Pink saves the life of a zillionaire, he's given a million dollar reward and becomes very wealthy. However, his rich lifestyle is threatened when two other malcontent millionaires try to get the Panther out of their exclusive neighborhood. "Happy Trails Pinky": Set in 1880, Pinky's successful stage coach company is threatened by the completion of the transcontinental railroad and a not too bright robber.
50	10	"A Hard Day's Pink" "You Only Pink Twice"	November 12, 1994
51	11	"It's Just a Gypsy in My Soup" "Three Aliens and A Footstool"	November 19, 1994
52	12	"Mummy Dearest" "Feast or Famine"	November 26, 1994
53	13	"No Pink is an Island" "Pinky and the Golden Fleece"	December 3, 1994
"No Pink is an Island" features The Ant and the Aardvark
54	14	"Home Stretch Pinky" "Pink Pucks"	December 10, 1994
55	15	"The Reluctant Ninja Pink" "Pantherella"	December 17, 1994
56	16	"Pink's Ark" "Rain or Snow or Pink of Night"	December 24, 1994
57	17	"Pink in the Middle" "Pink in the Poke"	December 31, 1994
"Pink in the Poke": Mrs. Chubalingo hires Pink to deliver a singing telegram to her son in prison, but it's all a scheme to help her son escape by having him switch clothes with Pink. Pink teams up with a dimwitted prisoner in order to escape. "Pink in the Middle": The Panther's big barbecue almost goes up in smoke when his obnoxious new neighbor, the Aardvark, tries to eat Pink's boss, the ant.
58	18	"A Nut at the Opera" "The Pink Panther (That's Me) Presents Hamm-n-Eggz"	January 7, 1995
"A Nut at the Opera": When Pink accidentally puts the opera's star tenor out of commission and must take over the lead himself, the discarded tenor becomes a vengeful phantom, bent on destroying Pink. "The Pink Panther (That's Me) Presents Hamm-n-Eggz": Hamm and Eggs accidentally fall into (and royally mess up) a job creating the perfect wedding for the obnoxious daughter of the mafioso hit-man Vinnie "The Fist" Phistopholies.
59	19	"The Pink Panther (That's Me) Presents Voodoo Man" "The Pink Panther (That's Me) Presents 7 Manly Men and the Kid"	January 14, 1995
"The Pink Panther (That's Me) Presents Voodoo Man": When Voodoo man's island is wiped out by a storm, he goes to New York to find the weatherman he believes is responsible for the disaster-and in the process finds himself a home and a new family. "The Pink Panther (That's Me) Presents 7 Manly Men and the Kid": When the toy surprise in a box of "Bongo Smacks" cereal fails to live up to its advertised promise, the Manly Men decide to confront the company's owner head-on to get a replacement for their little niece.
60	20	"The Pink Panther (That's Me) Presents The Texas Toads" "Driving Mr. Pink" "The Pink Panther (That's Me) Presents The Ant and the Aardvark"	April 12, 1995
"The Pink Panther (That's Me) Presents The Texas Toads": The Texas Toads, preparing to place first in a chili cook-off, are distracted by villain, much to Sheriff's pleasure. Sheriff almost wins first place, but the Texas Toads come back after defeating the villain. "Driving Mr. Pink": Pinky calls a taxi to get to an urgent appointment, only to find that the taxi driver is the Voodoo Man, who drives like a maniac. "Driving Mr. Pink" was shown for the U.S. theatrical release of The Pebble and the Penguin, and the final Pink Panther theatrical short to be reissued into a television short. "The Pink Panther (That's Me) Presents The Ant and the Aardvark": The Aardvark keeps trying to eat the Ant, but fails with the Rhino involved.

== Home media ==
On February 21, 2006, MGM Home Entertainment and Sony Pictures Home Entertainment released a DVD set in France (As "La Nouvelle Panthère Rose") and Germany (As "Der rosarote Panther - Die neue Show"). This set contains all forty episodes of the first season. The set was released in the United Kingdom (as "The New Pink Panther Show - Season 1, Vol 1"), but only consisted of the first twenty episodes of the first season. A second volume was never released. 20th Century Fox Home Entertainment reissued the sets in February 2009, with the UK getting the same boxset as France and Germany. Season 2 has not seen any DVD releases.

The show is also available on Tubi and on the official YouTube Channel. It was available on Pluto TV before being taken off, but it has since been added back to the platform. These prints refer to the series as The New Pink Panther Show, as with the DVDs.
