= Daffy Flies North =

1980 Warner Bros cartoon

Daffy Flies North is a 1980 Warner Bros. cartoon featuring Daffy Duck. It first aired April 1, 1980 on NBC as part of the Daffy Duck's Easter Egg-Citement special.

The story was co-written by Tony Benedict, John Dunn, and Friz Freleng. The film was co-produced by David H. DePatie and Friz Freleng.

== Plot ==
Daffy tries to find alternative means of going north in the summer.

== Story ==
A flock of black ducks are migrating north in the summer. Amongst them is an out-of-shape Daffy Duck. The flock leader informs Daffy that he is out of formation and questions him about not having any duck's instinct. Daffy strays from the flock and makes a rough 3-point landing onto a haystack (with a pitchfork temporary pointed on his tail).

1. Daffy tries hitchhiking, without success at first; he tries again, only to get the attention of a car full of duck hunters and their dogs. This makes the poor duck run for his own life.

2. Daffy then comes across a truck hauling a trailer containing a chair. He hops onto the chair, but the trailer's attachment breaks off, sending Daffy and the chair downhill into the pond.

3. The duck, wearing a pair of skis, throws a grappling hook onto an incoming car's rear fender; giving him a ride of his life until gravity begins to drag him into another pond. That is when he comes across a horse and plots to ride him north.

4. Daffy then tries to gain the horse's trust and tries to ride it, without much progress. He tries to hop on again, only to be dumped into the pond. (The horse laughs at Daffy.)

5. He tries to jump on the horse from behind, but to no avail.

6. The duck manages to take the horse by surprise from a wooden fence, but as he rides, the duck's head gets banged up on the ceiling of a metal bridge.

7. Daffy then grabs a saddle and tries to straddle it up, but the horse keeps resisting the effort. This makes the duck stare at the horse in order to make it listen to reason, but unfortunately doesn't realize that the horse's trifling has led Daffy to a rocky cliff. The ground where the duck is standing on gives way and gravity ensues.

8. He then manages to saddle the horse from a high tree branch and ties himself around the horse's body, but the saddle begins to lean over from the galloping and Daffy ends up upside-down. As the horse gallops into the lake, Daffy, unfortunately, drags it out of the lake.

9. Daffy tries to ride the saddle onto the horse from the roof of the barn, but overshoots the landing and falls into the horse trough. (The horse laughs at Daffy again.)

10. The duck then tries to swing his way onto the horse, but misses and lands on a bull. The raging bull chases Daffy onto an airport, but Daffy manages to safely board the jet plane, only to realize that the plane is taking him to South America. It is going to be tough finding the duck squadron from here on out.

"That's All, Folks."

Note: the running gag of a cartoon character trying to ride an uncooperative horse only to fail and have the horse laugh at him, also appears in the Pink Panther cartoon Pinto Pink.

== Credits ==
Story, layout, animation, and backgrounds: Members of the Screen Cartoonists Local 839

Voices: Mel Blanc

Editor: Bob Gillis

Musical Direction: Harper MacKay

Directors: Tony Benedict, Gerry Chiniquy, Art Davis, and Dave Detiege
