= List of The Pink Panther characters =

The following is a list of characters from The Pink Panther feature film and cartoon series.

== Overview ==
List indicators
- This table shows the recurring characters and the actors who have physically or vocally portrayed them throughout the franchise.
- A dark grey cell indicates the character was not in the film, or that the character's presence in the film has not yet been announced.
- A ^{A} indicates a role through use of footage from previously released media, with no new footage recorded.
- A ^{D} indicates an appearance in scenes deleted from the initial version of the film.
- A ^{P} indicates an appearance through photographs and / or likeness.
- A ^{V} indicates a voice-only role, with new vocal footage recorded.

Characters	The Pink Panther	A Shot in the Dark	Inspector Clouseau	The Return of the Pink Panther	The Pink Panther Strikes Again	Revenge of the Pink Panther	Trail of the Pink Panther	Curse of the Pink Panther	Son of the Pink Panther	The Pink Panther	The Pink Panther 2
Characters	1963	1964	1968	1975	1976	1978	1982	1983	1993	2006	2009
Inspector Jacques Clouseau Protector of the Pink Panther	Peter Sellers	Peter Sellers	Alan Arkin	Peter Sellers	Peter Sellers	Peter Sellers	Peter Sellers	Turk Thrust II (Roger Moore)	Mentioned	Steve Martin	Steve Martin
The Pink Panther	Appeared			Appeared	Appeared	Appeared	Appeared	Appeared	Appeared	Appeared	Appeared
Sir Charles Lytton The Phantom Laurence Millikin The Tornado	David Niven			Christopher Plummer			David Niven Rich Little^{V}	David Niven Rich Little^{V}			Johnny Hallyday
Simone Clouseau-Lytton	Capucine	Mentioned					Capucine	Capucine			
Princess Dala Maria Gambrelli	Claudia Cardinale	Elke Sommer							Claudia Cardinale		
Chief Inspector Charles LaRousse Dreyfus		Herbert Lom		Herbert Lom	Herbert Lom	Herbert Lom	Herbert Lom	Herbert Lom	Herbert Lom	Kevin Kline	John Cleese
Cato Fong		Burt Kwouk		Burt Kwouk	Burt Kwouk	Burt Kwouk	Burt Kwouk	Burt Kwouk	Burt Kwouk		
François		André Maranne		André Maranne	André Maranne	André Maranne	André Maranne	André Maranne	Dermot Crowley		
Hercule Lajoy		Graham Stark					Graham Stark				
Professor Auguste Balls					Harvey Korman^{D}	Graham Stark	Harvey Korman	Harvey Korman Graham Stark	Graham Stark		
Sergeant Clifton Sleigh								Ted Wass			
Gendarme Jacques Gambrelli									Roberto Benigni		
Nicole Durant-Clouseau										Emily Mortimer	Emily Mortimer
Gendarme Gilbert Ponton										Jean Reno	Jean Reno
Renard										Philip Goodwin	Philip Goodwin

== Inspector Jacques Clouseau ==
- First appearance: The Pink Panther (1963)
- Appearances: All Panther films except Son of the Pink Panther (not counting picture cameo)

Jacques Clouseau is a clumsy, incompetent, but zealous policeman and detective. A scene in Revenge of the Pink Panther shows him wearing the full dress uniform of an Inspecteur divisionnaire or Chef inspecteur divisionnaire (as top offices of a usual inspector's career; both ranks roughly equal to a police major or superintendent). He speaks English—with a ludicrous French accent—while other characters speak English, often with their own accents. Clouseau's accent is not emphasized in the first film, but from A Shot in the Dark onwards, the exaggerated accent became part of the joke. It has been suggested that portraying the incompetent policeman as French is based on a British stereotype of the French police or even the French population as a whole.

Peter Sellers, the actor portraying Clouseau, remarked that, in his opinion, Clouseau knew he was a buffoon, but had an incredible knack for survival. Sheer luck or clumsiness usually saves him, as in the first film wherein a farcical car chase around a fountain results in the collision of all the vehicles and the capture of the thieves. This approach accelerates, with Clouseau falling down stairs, falling into pools and fountains, causing fires and disasters, and even being bombed repeatedly, an idea worked into Steve Martin's portrayal of the character. In The Pink Panther Strikes Again, assassins from all over the world are sent to kill Clouseau, whereupon he moves from their target at just the right moment to ensure that the killers eliminate one another. In Trail of the Pink Panther, it is shown that during World War II, Clouseau fought in the French Resistance, but the flashbacks only serve to reiterate the fact that Clouseau can survive anything despite, or perhaps due to, his incompetence.

Inspector Clouseau is a patriotic Frenchman whose country is professedly his highest priority, has been prone to infatuation (often reciprocated) after being cuckolded by Sir Charles Lytton, and is repeatedly perplexed by transvestites, to the extent that he addresses them as "Sir or Madame."

The role was originated and developed by Peter Sellers over the years but has also been played by Alan Arkin (in Inspector Clouseau), Daniel Peacock and Lucca Mezzofonti (as younger versions in flashbacks in Trail of the Pink Panther), Roger Moore (in a cameo appearance at the conclusion of Curse of the Pink Panther), and Steve Martin (in the 2006 Pink Panther film and its 2009 sequel).

== Chief Inspector Charles LaRousse Dreyfus ==
- First Appearance: A Shot in the Dark (1964)
- Appearances: All Panther films except the first film and Inspector Clouseau.

Clouseau's superior, Charles Dreyfus, was introduced in A Shot in the Dark, wherein his door label identifies him as a Commissaire divisionnaire (Police colonel or Chief Superintendent) of the Brigade criminelle. He is constantly driven to distraction by Clouseau's bungling and is eventually driven insane. In The Return of the Pink Panther, Dreyfus holds the rank of Chief Inspector—but again becomes insane by the end of the film—which shows Dreyfus straitjacketed in a padded cell, writing "Kill Clouseau" on the wall (with his toes). As in A Shot in the Dark, Dreyfus initially suffers a variety of personal injuries (involving his gun and a cigarette lighter of a similar shape and accidentally cutting off his thumb with a cigar cutter)—before accidentally strangling his therapist while fantasizing Clouseau's death, then trying to assassinate Clouseau with a sniper's rifle. In The Pink Panther Strikes Again, Dreyfus is about to be released from an asylum after a complete recovery; however, within five minutes of Clouseau's arrival to speak to the board on Dreyfus' behalf, he suffers a variety of injuries, causing him to relapse. Then Dreyfus escapes the asylum and kidnaps a scientist, forcing him to build a disintegrator ray to intimidate the rest of the world into attempting to assassinate Clouseau. Dreyfus appears to disintegrate at the end of Strikes Again, but subsequently (and without any explanation) re-appears in Revenge of the Pink Panther and is reinstated Chief Inspector when Clouseau is mistakenly declared dead. Actor Herbert Lom gave his character a pronounced tic which occurred under particular stress, and an accompanying childlike giggle when plotting Clouseau's murder.

The Dreyfus character seems to get a quasi-reboot at the beginning of each new film as he mysteriously re-appears as Clouseau's superior, most often without explanation, after committing various heinous crimes. At the conclusion of A Shot in the Dark he is revealed to have murdered 10 people in his zeal to rid himself of Clouseau (and confesses so), yet he returns as Chief Inspector in Return of the Pink Panther. The character is killed off at the end of The Pink Panther Strikes Again, but again inexplicably returns in the sequel, Revenge of the Pink Panther.

In Son of the Pink Panther, Dreyfus (a Commissioner once again) deals with Clouseau's equally buffoonish son Jacques Gambrelli, but he is more tolerant of Gambrelli. At the end of the film, Dreyfus weds Clouseau's former lover Maria Gambrelli (Jacques Gambrelli's mother) but is shocked to learn that Clouseau and Maria conceived twins: Jacques and Jacqueline Gambrelli.

In the 2006 reboot The Pink Panther, Dreyfus (again as Chief Inspector) uses Clouseau as a decoy while he himself attempts to solve the crimes. Dreyfus merely views Clouseau as an idiot and never attempts to have him killed, whereas Clouseau attacks his employer at one point, mistaking his identity. Later in the film, Dreyfus is dragged accidentally behind Clouseau's Smart Car and appears in the hospital, where Clouseau's bumbling causes him to fall out of a window. In the 2009 sequel The Pink Panther 2, Dreyfus plays a much smaller role than in the previous film and is less hostile towards Clouseau.

Dreyfus was played by Herbert Lom in the Blake Edwards films, and by Kevin Kline in the 2006 film. He was played by John Cleese in the 2009 sequel.

== Cato Fong ==
- First appearance: A Shot in the Dark (1964)
- Appearances: All Panther films except the first film, the 1968 film Inspector Clouseau and the 2006–2009 films.

Cato (spelled "Kato" in A Shot in the Dark as a tribute to Kato in the Green Hornet television series) is Clouseau's manservant, and an expert in martial arts. It is unclear whether he believes Clouseau to be a great detective or whether he merely humors him. It is a running joke that he is instructed to attack Clouseau unexpectedly, to keep Clouseau's combat skills and vigilance sharp. Cato often takes these instructions to the point of ambushing Clouseau in his own house or at times when Clouseau obviously would prefer not to be disturbed. If they are interrupted during such an attack (as by a telephone call), Cato ceases to project the image of assailant and becomes a well-disciplined valet. Regardless of who comes off worse in the actual battle (and it is Clouseau who is more often humiliated, since Cato's ambushes usually do take him by surprise) Clouseau always gets his revenge on Cato by dealing him a sucker blow after it seems the fight is over.

In later films, Cato helps Clouseau on some cases, as in Hong Kong, when Clouseau takes advantage of his own assumed death to determine the identity of his would-be killer. Here, Cato wears spectacles as a disguise but collides with various objects when the spectacles impair his vision.

In Revenge, Cato, believing his master to be dead, runs a covert brothel in Clouseau's apartment: the entrance password is "Inspector Clouseau", which causes a humorous scene when the true Inspector Clouseau appears. Cato opens another brothel in Curse of the Pink Panther, and converts Clouseau's apartment into a museum featuring all the disguises the inspector has worn over the years.

In the earlier series, Cato was played by Burt Kwouk. In the re-launch, the role of Cato was offered to Jackie Chan, but the character was later scrapped for fear that the Chinese stereotype would be offensive, and Cato was replaced by a new character, Gendarme Gilbert Ponton (Jean Reno), assigned by Chief Inspector Dreyfus to watch over Clouseau. In a reversal of the Cato-Clouseau relationship, Clouseau often attacks Ponton unexpectedly, only to be stopped by a single blow.

== François Chevalier ==
François, Dreyfus' assistant, generally observes his boss' interactions with Clouseau (and subsequent emotional breakdowns) with placid bemusement. André Maranne, a French actor, played François in six Panther films. In Son of the Pink Panther, he was replaced by Dermot Crowley. In A Shot in the Dark, Trail of the Pink Panther and Curse of the Pink Panther he is referred to as Sergeant François Duval whereas in the three sequels of the 1970s he is Sergeant François Chevalier. In the 2006 reboot, Philip Goodwin plays a similar character named Renard. Goodwin returned as Renard in the 2009 sequel.

== Sir Charles Lytton/The Phantom ==
"The Phantom" is a jewel thief, Clouseau's archenemy (after Dreyfus) in several of the films and known to the public as Sir Charles Lytton. He serves as the primary villain of the first film, at the end of which (and with help from Clouseau's wife and an exiled princess) he frames Clouseau for his past robberies and has him temporarily sent to prison. This ignites Clouseau's thirst for revenge in the third Sellers/Edwards film, in which the Pink Panther is stolen from a museum.

In the first film he was played by David Niven, and in Return by Christopher Plummer. In later films, an aging and frail Niven made cameo appearances in the role, with his voice dubbed by impressionist Rich Little. In these later films, Lytton is supposed to have been married to Clouseau's ex-wife after the events of the first Pink Panther, even though in Return, his wife had been a different character, yet seemingly familiar with Clouseau (seeing through, and laughing at, his disguises). In The Pink Panther 2, the diamond is stolen by a similar master thief, "the Tornado" (Johnny Hallyday).

== Professor Auguste Balls ==
Professor Auguste Balls is an eccentric shop owner who supplies Clouseau with his numerous disguises. He was portrayed by Graham Stark in Revenge of the Pink Panther and Son of the Pink Panther, while Harvey Korman played him in Trail of the Pink Panther and Curse of the Pink Panther. Although Korman was the first actor to portray Balls, his scenes in The Pink Panther Strikes Again were cut and were not used until Trail of the Pink Panther six years later.

Professor Balls has a wife, Martha (Liz Smith), and an assistant, Cunny (Danny Schiller), who make brief appearances.

== Cartoon only ==
=== The Little Man ===
The Little Man
- Pink Panther character
- First appearance: The Pink Phink (1964)
- Created by: David H. DePatie; Friz Freleng
- Based on: Yosemite Sam (design); Little Caesars (character inspiration)
- Designed by: David H. DePatie; Friz Freleng
- Voiced by: Lennie Weinrib (1970); Wallace Shawn (1993–1995); Alex Nussbaum (2010)

In-universe information
- Species: Humanoid
- Gender: Male

The Little Man, sometimes known as Big Nose, is a stock character best known for appearing in the original Pink Panther shorts created by David DePatie and Friz Freleng. He is considered the main antagonist of the Pink Panther series.

The Little Man first appeared in 1964 in the first entry of the Pink Panther animated series, The Pink Phink. The Little Man was actually known by the animators at DePatie-Freleng as "Big Nose" and was originally created as a spoof and was done as a caricature of Friz Freleng as a joke. The character became a foil for the Pink Panther and appeared throughout the series in its 16-year duration.

The Little Man appears in various roles throughout the entire original series. He seldom speaks and has a distinctive big nose, and he is usually white in color but sometimes given a Caucasian shading. In some cases, he seems to be wearing nothing, but in other cases, he wears a costume (or at least a hat) fitting to his role in the cartoon. Several cartoons depict him with a white dog as his pet.

While he resembles Inspector Clouseau in the animated opening credits of Pink Panther films as well as that character's own cartoon series, the Little Man is usually said to be a caricature of Friz Freleng, with his mustache, short stature, and equally short temper. (These same characteristics of Freleng had previously served as an inspiration for Freleng's Warner Bros. cartoon character Yosemite Sam.)

The Little Man makes a cameo in the 1970 short "Bridgework", starring Roland and Rattfink, another pair of characters created by DePatie-Freleng. Here, he is voiced by Lennie Weinrib.

The Little Man appears in the 1993 TV series The Pink Panther, where he is voiced by Wallace Shawn. He goes by various names and fills multiple roles as he does in the shorts.

The Little Man also appears in the Cartoon Network show Pink Panther and Pals as a main character and main antagonist in the entire series (here renamed as Big Nose). He always has a plan to get rid of the teenaged Panther in an antagonistic manner, but the Panther consistently foils his plans. Sometimes his dog tries to get rid of the Pink Panther, only to side with the Pink Panther later in the short.
