= Sansür =

1970 Turkish animated short

Sansür (En: Censorship) is a 1970 Turkish animated short directed by Tan Oral. The film won the grand prize at the 1970 TRT's Television Films Competition. It is then stated that the film will be shown on TV screens a week after the award ceremony, but the film is never aired on TV. Sansür was published as a book in 1977. But a court ruled to publish the book with a label stating "not suitable for those under 18" & "subject to threat".

== Awards ==
- 1970 TRT’s Culture, Science and Arts Awards, Television Films Competition, 16 mm category, Grand Prize
- 1975 Akşehir-Nasrettin Hoca short movie competition, Big Prize
