= Edmond L. DePatie =

- Born: Edmond Louis DePatie; January 27, 1900; Hartford, Connecticut, U.S.
- Died: 6 August 1966 (aged 66); Chowchilla, California, U.S.
- Occupation: Executive
- Years active: 1955–1966
- Children: David H. DePatie

Edmond Louis DePatie (/dəˈpæti/; January 27, 1900 – August 6, 1966) was an American film industry executive. He was vice president and general manager of Warner Bros. Burbank studio, and on 18 April, 1966 at the 38th Academy Awards, DePatie was honored with the Jean Hersholt Humanitarian Award, just four months before his death.

DePatie succeeded Jean Hersholt as president of the Motion Picture Relief Fund in 1955, later launching a campaign for the establishment of a Motion Picture Exposition and Hall of Fame to honor filmmaking and to bring in revenue for the Motion Picture & Television Fund Country House. These plans were not successful, and despite the efforts of many over the years, a Hollywood Museum that benefits the Country House has not become a reality.

DePatie was born in Hartford, Connecticut. He died of a heart attack while vacationing in Chowchilla, California on August 6, 1966 at the age of 66. David H. DePatie was his son.

== Sources ==
- Staff writers (7 August 1966). "E. L. Depatie, Warner Bros. Official, Dies". The Los Angeles Times. Archived from the original on May 25, 2011.
