= Pacific Title Archives =

American film storage and archiving company

Pacific Title Archives is an American company founded in 1935 by Pacific Title & Art Studio as a film storage and archiving company.

Pacific Title & Art was sold in 2007 for US$23 million, after which it "ran into hard times." The 90-year-old company went into receivership and was expected to be liquidated.

However, according to the company website, "Pacific Title Archives is currently providing service to the motion picture film, television, recording and multimedia entertainment industries. The preservation, care and protection of important video, audio, motion picture film, records, digital media and other media assets remain their primary function and concern."

In 2014 Gawk Incorporated signed a letter of intent with PTA. It is to source and distribute content through Gawk's online global distribution program.
