= The Pink Phink =

1964 animated short film directed by Friz Freleng

- Original theatrical poster
- Directed by: Friz Freleng; Co-director: Hawley Pratt
- Story by: John W. Dunn
- Produced by: David H. DePatie; Friz Freleng; Mirisch-Geoffrey-DePatie-Freleng
- Edited by: Lee Gunther
- Music by: Theme music: Henry Mancini; Score: William Lava
- Animation by: Mirisch-Geoffrey-DePatie-Freleng Productions
- Layouts by: Dick Ung (uncredited)
- Backgrounds by: Tom O'Loughlin
- Color process: Deluxe
- Production company: The Mirisch Company
- Distributed by: United Artists
- Release date: December 18, 1964
- Running time: 7 minutes
- Country: United States
- Language: Silent

The Pink Phink is a 1964 American animated short comedy film directed by Friz Freleng. It is the first animated short starring the Pink Panther, based on the character created for the opening credits of Blake Edwards' film released a year earlier. A total of 124 6-minute cartoons were produced between 1964 and 1980. The short won the Academy Award for Best Animated Short at the 37th Academy Awards.

In the film, the "Little Man" attempts to paint a house blue. The Panther keeps tricking him into using pink paint, while the painter is completely unaware of the Panther's presence. The Man eventually confronts the Panther and attempts to destroy his opponent's paint cans. He accidentally creates pink grass, pink flowers, pink bushes, pink trees, and a pink version of the Sun.

== Plot ==
The Pink Panther comes across an unnamed housepainter (known as the "Little Man") painting a house blue. Disgusted by the color blue, the Pink Panther swaps out his blue paint bucket with pink paint. What follows is a series of gags where the painter attempts to paint something blue, but each time Pink thwarts him in a new way, and paints the object/area pink - and all the while, the painter is completely unaware of the Panther's presence.

After a repeat series of these gags, the painter finally catches an eyeful of the Pink Panther carrying his brush and bucket; enraged, the painter grabs a rifle and pursues Pink throughout the house. As the painter exits the house searching for his target, the Pink Panther, still inside the house, reaches out from a window and pours pink paint into the gun's barrel behind the painter's back. The painter aims his gun, but just before he fires, the Pink Panther shuts the window as a blast of pink paint shoots out from the gun and splatters onto the house. The painter continues shooting at the Panther, and, when all is said and done, the entire exterior of the house has been painted pink.

Having had enough, the exasperated painter collects all of the Panther's pink paint cans and buries them in the ground. However, much to the painter's surprise, this causes pink grass, flowers, bushes, and trees to sprout from the ground outside the house, as a pink sun rises into frame in the horizon, turning the sky pink as well. Overjoyed at the sight of his dream house, Pink gives the disheartened painter a smooch of gratitude before proceeding to fetch his belongings and move into the house. But just before he enters his new home, he paints the white man completely pink. The painter bangs his head against the Pink Panther's mailbox outside in frustration as the content Panther strolls into his new house as the pink sun sets and the cartoon fades out.

== Academy Award ==
The Pink Phink was the first Pink Panther animated short produced by DePatie–Freleng Enterprises and by winning the 1964 Academy Award for Animated Short Film, it marked the first time that a studio won an Academy Award with its first animated short. It is also both the only animated Pink Panther short and the only installment in the franchise to win the award.

== Credits ==
- "The Pink Panther Theme": Henry Mancini
- Produced by: David H. DePatie, Friz Freleng
- Directed by: Friz Freleng
- Executive Producer: Walter Mirisch
- Co-director: Hawley Pratt
- Story by: John W. Dunn
- Animation: Don Williams, Bob Matz, Norman McCabe, Laverne Harding
- Layout: Dick Ung (uncredited)
- Backgrounds: Tom O'Loughlin
- Film editor: Lee Gunther
- Camera operator: John Burton, Jr.
- Production supervisor: Bill Orcutt
- Music score: William Lava

== Laugh track ==
A laugh track was added to the theatrical Pink Panther cartoons when they were broadcast as part of the Pink Panther Show aired on NBC, and this laugh track still appears when the show is aired on the Spanish language Boomerang TV channel, and the French Channel Gulli. Most American broadcasts currently air minus the laugh track. The Pink Phink can be viewed in its original form with full titles and sans laugh track on The Official Pink Panther channel on YouTube along with the MGM Television logo.

== See also ==
- List of American films of 1963
- List of The Pink Panther cartoons
