= List of The Pink Panther cartoons =

This is a list of the original 124 Pink Panther animated shorts produced between December 18, 1964, and February 1, 1980, by DePatie–Freleng Enterprises for release by United Artists. The initial 92 shorts were primarily released theatrically. These entries subsequently appeared on Saturday mornings via The Pink Panther Show under the same umbrella title starting in 1969 on NBC. All 32 made-for-television entries were distributed to theaters after initially airing on The Pink Panther Show under the title The All New Pink Panther Show in 1978 on ABC, three of which were reissues of former shorts with new music cues. Every short in the series has the word pink in the title.

The Pink Panther's long-time foil, known as the Little Man, appeared in many entries except where noted.

== 1960s ==
=== 1964 ===
No. overall	No. in year	Title	Directed by	Original release date
1	1	The Pink Phink	Friz Freleng; Hawley Pratt (co-director)	December 18, 1964
The Pink Panther sabotages the plans of a housepainter (the Little Man) who wants to paint a house blue, and counters this by painting the house pink. Note: First animated short featuring the Pink Panther and first to be produced by Depatie-Freleng Enterprises; it is the only Pink Panther cartoon to have won an Academy Award for Animated Shorts.
2	2	Pink Pajamas	Friz Freleng; Hawley Pratt (co-director)	December 25, 1964
The Pink Panther sneaks into a house to stay the night, but ends up having to hide from the residence's drunk owner. Note: Footage reused in Pink-In; first cartoon in the series where The Pink Panther has a red colored outline; the Little Man does not appear.

=== 1965 ===
No. overall	No. in year	Title	Directed by	Original release date
3	1	We Give Pink Stamps	Friz Freleng; Hawley Pratt (co-director)	February 12, 1965
Late at night, the Pink Panther hides in the Gambles Department Store, and spends the night trying to hide from the night-shift janitor (the Little Man), while also trying out many of the store's many products on display, with rather unusual results. Note: Some prints of this cartoon feature the updated opening title music instead of the rendition featured in the previous two shorts; these prints also unintentionally cut off a small portion from the opening of the short's music score.
4	2	Dial "P" for Pink	Friz Freleng; Hawley Pratt (co-director)	March 17, 1965
A masked burglar tries numerous times to crack a safe, but this safe turns out to be the Pink Panther's residence. Note: Features the theme song from the Blake Edwards film A Shot in the Dark, which would be featured prominently in The Inspector cartoon series; on some runs, this short uses laugh tracks, though it is not the first episode to have them; the Little Man does not appear.
5	3	Sink Pink	Friz Freleng (uncredited); Hawley Pratt (co-director)	April 12, 1965
A big-game hunter from Texas (voiced by Paul Frees), while on safari in Africa, uses a "Noah's Ark" plot to catch animals in Africa to make fur clothing for his wife Nora, but he realizes he has yet to catch a pink panther to complete his haul, and so, the hunter travels the land searching for the Pink Panther. Note: One of two cartoons where the Pink Panther has dialogue - the Panther's voice is provided by Rich Little; the Little Man does not appear.
6	4	Pickled Pink	Friz Freleng; Hawley Pratt (co-director)	May 12, 1965
A homeless Pink Panther is befriended by a drunken man (voiced by Mel Blanc), who offers him a place to spend the night, but tries to hide him from his short-tempered wife (also voiced by Blanc), who hates him bringing "drunken bums" into the house. Note: Footage reused in Pink-In; the Little Man does not appear.
7	5	Pinkfinger	Friz Freleng; Hawley Pratt (co-director)	May 13, 1965
With the help of an offscreen voiceover (voiced by Paul Frees), the Pink Panther becomes a secret agent and attempts to track down various criminal espionage agents. But things become complicated and he runs into bad luck every time he tries to spy on the agents, despite constant prodding from the narrator. Note: Early television prints of the episode censor the scene where the Pink Panther is shot in the face through the peephole door of the enemy spies' hideout, having him be blown up by a small bomb instead. The Little Man does not appear.
8	6	Shocking Pink	Friz Freleng; Hawley Pratt (co-director)	May 13, 1965
The Pink Panther tries to have a quiet afternoon, but is interrupted by an offscreen voiceover (voiced by Larry Storch) persuading him to try various do-it-yourself tasks around the house. The Panther fails miserably at these tasks, growing more and more agitated with the voiceover's prodding all the while. Note: The Little Man does not appear; first Pink Panther short to use laugh tracks in television airings.
9	7	Pink Ice	Friz Freleng; Hawley Pratt (co-director)	June 10, 1965
In South Africa, the Pink Panther attempts to recover diamonds stolen from him by Deveraux and Hoskins, two thieving English diamond hunters. The pair repeatedly attempts to get the Panther out of the picture, but are continually thwarted by their witty adversary. Note: The second of two cartoons where the Pink Panther has dialogue; all voices are provided by Rich Little; the Little Man does not appear.
10	8	The Pink Tail Fly	Friz Freleng; Hawley Pratt (co-director)	August 25, 1965
Tired after watching several hours of late-night television, the Pink Panther has a late-night battle with a mosquito who constantly interrupts his sleep. Note: Last Pink Panther cartoon directed by series co-creator Friz Freleng; plot device reused for A Fly in the Pink (1971) and Pink S.W.A.T. (1978); the Little Man does not appear; features a brief music sting recycled from Pinkfinger.
11	9	Pink Panzer	Hawley Pratt	September 15, 1965
An offscreen voiceover (voiced by Paul Frees) pits the Pink Panther against his neighbor, Harry (also voiced by Frees), over unreturned garden tools. Note: The Little Man does not appear.
12	10	An Ounce of Pink	Hawley Pratt	October 20, 1965
The Pink Panther encounters and purchases a talking weight machine (voiced by Larry Storch), who claims to be able to not just calculate weight, but also predict the future. However, the Panther quickly develops animosity towards the weight machine after its predictions keep causing him misfortune. Note: The Little Man does not appear.
13	11	Reel Pink	Hawley Pratt	November 16, 1965
The Pink Panther goes fishing, but eventually gets twice sabotaged by one of his own bait worms. He ultimately does land a catch, only for it to turn out to be not a fish, but instead a rather aggressive crab that the Panther winds up in a one-on-one brawl against. Note: Not to be confused with the Pink Panther and Pals episode that takes place in a theater; footage reused for connecting bumper sequences on The Pink Panther Show; first title card to be animated.
14	12	Bully for Pink	Hawley Pratt	December 14, 1965
The Pink Panther becomes a bullfighter, but finds that his cloak has been devoured by moths just before an upcoming bullfight; outside the arena, he spots Marvelo, a magician, on his way to an upcoming performance, and swipes his cloak to use it in place of his own. Once he brings it out against the rather aggressive bull, it results in an illusion-filled bullfight where the magic cloak causes both the Panther and the bull to frequently disappear and reappear, and also produces things seemingly out of nowhere (including a short-tempered rabbit). Note: A different rendition of the Pink Panther theme is featured during the opening and closing theatrical credits; some plot devices reused for the 1979 short Toro Pink; the Little Man does not appear.

=== 1966 ===
No. overall	No. in year	Title	Directed by	Original release date
15	1	Pink Punch	Hawley Pratt	February 21, 1966
The Pink Panther introduces his own beverage, "Pink Punch"; however, the asterisk above the “I” on his advertising placard suddenly turns green. The Panther attempts to get rid of the annoying green asterisk numerous times, but his plans are thwarted by a large green asterisk, assumed to be the smaller one's parent. Note: The Little Man does not appear; second Pink Panther short to use laugh tracks.
16	2	Pink Pistons	Hawley Pratt	March 16, 1966
The Pink Panther buys a used car from a dealership, and redecorates it with pink lacquer spray paint. However, the car has a mind of its own; on the Panther's first drive about town, his car's competitive attitude lands the Panther in an unintentional race with Granny Flash, Senior Citizens Drag Champion, who drives a souped-up Model T. Note: Footage reused for connecting bumper sequence on The New Pink Panther Show; mistitled in airings on The Pink Panther Show as Pink Piston; The Little Man does not appear.
17	3	Vitamin Pink	Hawley Pratt	April 6, 1966
Based on the traditions of tonic-sellers in the Old West, the Pink Panther goes under the alias Dr. Phink and sells Vitamin Pink, a pill that can make the old and tired feel young and energetic again. However, when he gives a bottle to an aged former bank robber, he takes one too many pills, springs into his youth, and begins a new spree of robberies. As a result, the Pink Panther is deputized by the town sheriff - by force, at that - and is ordered to capture the bank robber himself. Note: The Little Man does not appear; this episode marks the first appearance of the Horse.
18	4	The Pink Blueprint	Hawley Pratt	May 25, 1966
On a construction site, the Pink Panther, disgusted at the sight of a blueprint for a rather plain-looking house, swaps the blueprint designs to his own "pinkprint" for a residence designed to his preferred specifications, and duels with the on-site contractor (the Little Man) to ensure that the house is built the way he intends. Note: First Pink Panther cartoon to be shown on television, and the third to use laugh tracks; a different rendition of The Pink Panther Theme is featured during the opening and closing theatrical credits in some, but not all prints; nominated for the Academy Award for Animated Short Film; footage reused in Pinkologist.
19	5	Pink, Plunk, Plink	Hawley Pratt; Friz Freleng (live-action director – uncredited)	May 25, 1966
The Pink Panther learns to play the violin and interrupts an orchestra's performance of Beethoven's Fifth Symphony at the Hollywood Bowl with his own theme played on various instruments, much to the anger of the conductor (the Little Man). Note: First cartoon scored by Walter Greene; the coughing audience member being shot dead is a reused gag from the Bugs Bunny short Rhapsody Rabbit, which was directed by Pink Panther series producer Friz Freleng; Henry Mancini makes a brief live-action cameo as himself being the only person in the Hollywood Bowl audience applauding the performance.
20	6	Smile Pretty, Say Pink	Hawley Pratt	May 29, 1966
The Pink Panther sabotages the efforts of a photographer (the Little Man) in Pinkstone National Park (a parody of Yellowstone National Park) after the photographer angrily refuses to pay the one-dollar camera fee. Note: Last cartoon fully scored by William Lava, although some of his previous scores would be recycled for later cartoons, starting from Congratulations It's Pink up to Therapeutic Pink.
21	7	Pink-A-Boo	Hawley Pratt	June 26, 1966
The Pink Panther battles with a hungry mouse raiding his refrigerator. He then reaches his boiling point when the mouse throws a late-night party with a crowd of other mice. Note: The Little Man appears briefly; the score for this cartoon would also be the standard for many Pink Panther cartoons between 1967 and 1976.
22	8	Genie with the Light Pink Fur	Hawley Pratt	September 14, 1966
The Pink Panther finds a talking magic lamp (voiced by Ralph James) and uses it to become a genie. However, he cannot get anyone to rub the lamp. Note: The title is a reference to the song "Jeanie with the Light Brown Hair".
23	9	Super Pink	Hawley Pratt	October 12, 1966
Inspired by his favorite Superguy comic book, the Pink Panther decides to be a superhero, and tries unsuccessfully several times to help an elderly woman in various ways. Note: Early television prints censored the scene of the Pink Panther being shot in the face while trying to wrestle a gun from a mugger's hand, with the gun changed via overlaid animation to a water pistol that sprays the Panther in the face. Footage reused for connecting bumper sequences on The Pink Panther Show; the Little Man does not appear; fourth Pink Panther short to use laugh tracks; the score for this cartoon would also be the standard for many Pink Panther cartoons between 1968 and 1977.
24	10	Rock-A-Bye Pinky	Hawley Pratt	December 23, 1966
The Little Man is out camping in the woods with his dog and keeps the Pink Panther, who's asleep in the branches of a tree above him, awake with his snoring. Sick and tired of the noise, the Panther attempts to get rid of the Little Man, but every attempt only gets the dog into trouble, as his owner is misled to believe that his dog is actively trying to harm, or even kill him. Note: First appearance of the Little Man's dog; footage reused in Pinkologist; the score for this cartoon would also be the standard for many Pink Panther cartoons between 1967 and 1974.

=== 1967 ===
No. overall	No. in year	Title	Directed by	Original release date
25	1	Pinknic	Hawley Pratt	January 6, 1967
The Pink Panther wakes up in a log cabin in January, completely snowed in, and has to avoid starving to death before spring arrives. To make matters worse, a mouse, also unwilling to starve, attempts to eat the Pink Panther for his own survival. Note: The score for this cartoon would also be the standard for many Pink Panther cartoons between 1968 and 1977.
26	2	Pink Panic	Hawley Pratt	January 11, 1967
The Pink Panther stays in the haunted Dead Dog Hotel on a stormy night, where he attempts to escape a troublesome ghost and a sneaky skeleton running about the hotel. Note: Final cartoon to introduce new music scores by Walter Greene, with the exceptions of various one-time music cues, as scores from this and the previous five entries would be recycled until 1977.
27	3	Pink Posies	Hawley Pratt	April 26, 1967
The Pink Panther replaces all the yellow posies in a garden with pink ones, angering a gardener (the Little Man) in the process. As the gardener attempts to ensure that the planted posies remain yellow, the Pink Panther attempts more and more devious and clever methods to replace them with pink flowers. Note: Footage reused for connecting bumper sequences on The New Pink Panther Show and in Pinkologist.
28	4	Pink of the Litter	Hawley Pratt	May 17, 1967
The Pink Panther is caught littering in the polluted town of Litterburg, and as punishment, he is sentenced to clean up all of the litter in the entire town. Note: The Little Man appears in various roles.
29	5	In the Pink	Hawley Pratt	May 18, 1967
Noticing he is gaining weight, the Pink Panther decides to join a local gym, but does not have much luck getting into shape. To make matters worse, his efforts to shape up tend to cause harm to his fellow gym patron, The Little Man.
30	6	Jet Pink	Gerry Chiniquy	June 13, 1967
The Pink Panther stumbles into a military airfield and spots an X-13 experimental fighter jet. To fulfill his fantasy of becoming a famous pilot, he decides to fly it, but his complete lack of experience as a pilot results in a hazardous and chaotic flight. Note: The foreground character layer at the end of the piece was reused in Prefabricated Pink; the Little Man does not appear; first pink panther cartoon directed by Gerry Chiniquy.
31	7	Pink Paradise	Gerry Chiniquy	June 24, 1967
The Pink Panther arrives on a desert island, only to discover a Robinson Crusoe-esque native hunter (the Little Man) and his dog. Afraid of being hunted, the Panther hides from both of them. The dog gets suspicious and tries unsuccessfully to prove the Panther's existence to his owner, but this only leads to a series of misunderstandings where the hunter accuses his dog of trying to harm him and punishes him for it.
32	8	Pinto Pink	Hawley Pratt	July 19, 1967
Facing a long and treacherous journey to Anaheim, California, the Pink Panther spots a horse and gets the idea to tame it and ride there, but the horse is not willing to cooperate, sabotaging the Panther's constant efforts to saddle him, and finding humor in the Panther's repeated failures. Note: The Little Man does not appear; the Pink Panther also tries unsuccessfully to saddle a horse in Pink Valiant and Pinky Doodle. The running gag of a cartoon character trying to ride an uncooperative horse (only for the horse to laugh at him) appears in the 1980 Daffy Duck cartoon Daffy Flies North.
33	9	Congratulations It's Pink	Hawley Pratt	October 27, 1967
At the park, the Pink Panther spots what he thinks is a picnic basket of goodies and takes it for himself, but it's actually a family's baby basket containing a baby (voiced by June Foray). When he spots the baby's family leaving the park, and after failed attempts to leave that baby in the care of other residents in the park, he is left with no choice but to raise the toddler by himself until the parents return. Note: First cartoon to simultaneously utilize both Walter Greene and William Lava's music scores; features music recycled from An Ounce of Pink.
34	10	Prefabricated Pink	Hawley Pratt	November 22, 1967
The Pink Panther decides to get a job at a construction site, but wreaks havoc across the site instead, causing harm to the foreman and numerous fellow construction workers (all of whom are Little Men) while attempting to undertake various tasks, involving wet cement, hot rivets, pulleys, hammers, paint cans, and wooden boards. Note: The foreground character layer at the end was recycled from Jet Pink; features music recycled from An Ounce of Pink and Pink Panzer.
35	11	The Hand is Pinker than the Eye	Hawley Pratt	December 20, 1967
On a snow day, a cold Pink Panther sneaks into a house owned by Zammo the magician (the Little Man). He is both bewildered and bedeviled by the house's numerous magical illusions, and is constantly pestered by the magician's rabbit.
36	12	Pink Outs	Gerry Chiniquy	December 27, 1967
A series of 12 miniature cartoons that end when each one "pinks out". Notes: 11 of the 12 miniature cartoons were reused for connecting bumper sequences on The Pink Panther Show. This is the first cartoon in the series since the first where the Pink Panther has a black outline. This is also one of the two cartoons in the series where The Pink Panther's nose is black and not red, the other being Psychedelic Pink; features music recycled from Pinkfinger and Pink Panzer.

=== 1968 ===
No. overall	No. in year	Title	Directed by	Original release date
37	1	Sky Blue Pink	Hawley Pratt	January 3, 1968
The Pink Panther decides to try kite flying, but he bedevils a local homeowner (the Little Man) in the process. Note: Last cartoon in the series where The Pink Panther has a red colored outline; features music recycled from Pinkfinger.
38	2	Pinkadilly Circus	Hawley Pratt	February 21, 1968
The Pink Panther comes to the aid of a henpecked husband (the Little Man) who pulls a nail out of his foot. The husband then uses the Panther against his disapproving wife. Note: The title is a pun on “Piccadilly Circus”.
39	3	Psychedelic Pink	Hawley Pratt	March 13, 1968
The Pink Panther visits a psychedelic bookshop owned by a hippie Little Man, full of surreal imagery and operating on its own logic, that is to say, no logic at all. Note: Final title card to be animated, and last cartoon after Pink Outs where The Pink Panther's nose is black and not red; fifth Pink Panther short to use laugh tracks in its frequent reruns.
40	4	Come On In! The Water's Pink	Hawley Pratt	April 10, 1968
The Pink Panther visits Bicep Beach. Through his series of inflatable items that include fake muscles, weights, and a swimming pool, he impresses the ladies and steals the spotlight from a muscleman, who attempts to get revenge on him. Note: The Little Man does not appear; one of few cartoons to reuse music from Pink Panic.
41	5	Put-Put, Pink	Gerry Chiniquy	April 14, 1968
The Pink Panther turns his hand to building a motorcycle, but mayhem ensues whenever he goes for a drive. Note: First time the Little Man appears flesh-colored rather than white; one of few cartoons to reuse music from Pink Panic.
42	6	G.I. Pink	Hawley Pratt	May 1, 1968
The Pink Panther, eager to serve his country, joins the United States Army, and angers his sergeant (the Little Man) with his usual antics. Note: Footage reused in Pink-In; the title is a pun on "G.I. Joe"; features music recycled from Pink Panzer and An Ounce of Pink.
43	7	Lucky Pink	Hawley Pratt	May 7, 1968
Ever eager to help, the Pink Panther keeps returning a "lucky" horseshoe to its owner (the Little Man), a bank robber. However, the horseshoe keeps bringing incredible bad luck to the crook by continually attracting the police. Note: One of two cartoons to reuse music from Genie With the Light Pink Fur; one of few cartoons to reuse music from Pink Panic.
44	8	The Pink Quarterback	Hawley Pratt	May 22, 1968
After the Pink Panther flips a quarter to decide whether he should spend it on a hot dog or a hamburger, it rolls away, and he goes after it. Note: The theme of the Pink Panther pursuing an object was also used in Pink 8-Ball and Psst Pink; the Little Man appears briefly.
45	9	Twinkle, Twinkle, Little Pink	Hawley Pratt	June 30, 1968
The Pink Panther builds a house on a hill between an observatory and the moon, which annoys an astronomer (the Little Man) working at the observatory. Note: Features music recycled from Pink Ice and Pink Panzer; one of few cartoons to reuse music from Pink Panic.
46	10	Pink Valiant	Hawley Pratt	July 10, 1968
The Pink Panther has to rescue a princess kidnapped by the Black Knight (the Little Man), but he first must tame an uncooperative horse. Note: The title is a parody of the long running comic strip Prince Valiant created by Hal Foster.
47	11	The Pink Pill	Gerry Chiniquy	July 31, 1968
The Pink Panther slips on a banana peel and ends up in a hospital, where his elderly roommate keeps sniggering at all his misfortunes. Note: The Little Man appears briefly; features music recycled from Pink Ice and Pink Panzer.
48	12	Prehistoric Pink	Hawley Pratt	August 7, 1968
In prehistoric times, the Pink Panther and a caveman (the Little Man) try to work out the best way to move stone blocks.
49	13	Pink in the Clink	Gerry Chiniquy	September 18, 1968
The Pink Panther is forced by a burglar (the Little Man) to help him break into a manufacturing warehouse and crack a safe. Note: Footage reused in Pink-In; sixth Pink Panther episode to use laugh tracks in its frequent reruns; features music recycled from Pink Ice.
50	14	Little Beaux Pink	Hawley Pratt	October 2, 1968
The Pink Panther and a sheep come to live in Cattle County, Texas, and have to endure a sheep-abusing cattleman. Note: The Little Man does not appear.
51	15	Tickled Pink	Gerry Chiniquy	October 6, 1968
Longing to have a pair of roller skates, the Pink Panther is visited by his fairy godmother. He asks her for a pair of roller skates of his very own, to which she obliges. However, the skates are magical, and the Panther can't control them. Note: The Little Man does not appear; features music recycled from Pink Ice.
52	16	Pink Sphinx	Hawley Pratt	October 23, 1968
The Pink Panther buys an uncooperative dog-brained camel, and goes searching for a hidden Egyptian tomb. Note: Mistitled for television as The Pink Sphinx; the Little Man does not appear; features music recycled from Pink Ice and The Pink Tail Fly.
53	17	Pink Is a Many Splintered Thing	Gerry Chiniquy	November 20, 1968
The Pink Panther decides to become a lumberjack, but has to deal with his short-tempered boss, an overzealous lumberjack, and a swarm of bees. Note: Plot device reused in 1978 for Pink in the Woods; first film to be rated by the MPAA.
54	18	The Pink Package Plot	Art Davis	December 11, 1968
The Pink Panther is forced at gunpoint by a Soviet terrorist to deliver a packaged explosive to the Slobvanian Embassy (a parody of Slovenia), but must first find a way to get past the guard dog. Note: Footage reused in Pink-In; the Little Man does not appear.
55	19	Pinkcome Tax	Art Davis	December 20, 1968
In medieval times, the Pink Panther, as one of Robin Hood's Merry Men, tries to rescue a peasant (the Little Man) who has been thrown in prison for being too poor to pay his taxes.

=== 1969 ===
No. overall	No. in year	Title	Directed by	Original release date
56	1	Pink-A-Rella	Hawley Pratt	January 8, 1969
The Pink Panther finds a witch's magic wand and uses it to help a girl in rags become glamorous to win a date with Pelvis Parsley (a parody of Elvis Presley). Note: Both the title and the story are a parody of the story Cinderella; early television prints censor the witch's alcoholism by animating a chicken leg over her champagne glass and editing out the text reading "Champagne Flight" on a balloon tied to her broomstick; The Little Man does not appear; second of two cartoons to reuse music from Genie With the Light Pink Fur.
57	2	Pink Pest Control	Gerry Chiniquy	February 12, 1969
The Pink Panther has trouble with a persistent termite who devours every wooden item in his house. Note: The Little Man does not appear.
58	3	Think Before You Pink	Gerry Chiniquy	March 19, 1969
Pedestrian Pink Panther is having difficulty crossing a busy traffic intersection. This forces him to make various attempts so as to cross the intersection with suggestions from the President of the National Pedestrian Club (The Little Man), bringing in hilarious results.
59	4	Slink Pink	Hawley Pratt	April 2, 1969
The Pink Panther sneaks into a house on a snowy night, only to find out it belongs to a trophy hunter (the Little Man), whose dog tries to attack and reveal the intruding panther, but he's instead punished by his owner at every attempt, as poor timing results in the dog attacking his owner instead. Note: This short was censored for many television airings, particularly the scene where the dog shoots his owner in his bed, thinking he is the Pink Panther - all known remastered prints use the censored cut of the cartoon; halfway through the short, William Lava's score for Shocking Pink is reused throughout the rest of the cartoon.
60	5	In the Pink of the Night	Art Davis	May 18, 1969
The Pink Panther buys a cuckoo clock so that he can wake up early in the morning. However, since he's unwilling to wake up, the sentient cuckoo bird uses various methods to try to wake him up. Note: The Little Man does not appear.
61	6	Pink on the Cob	Hawley Pratt	May 29, 1969
The Pink Panther battles two crows who are trying to steal all the corn from his farm. Note: The Little Man does not appear.
62	7	Extinct Pink	Hawley Pratt	June 20, 1969
The Prehistoric Pink Panther fights over a bone with a caveman version of the Little Man, a big blue dinosaur, and a small green lizard, right until it is finally eaten by a crocodile. Note: This is the only cartoon fully scored by Doug Goodwin, and said score was later used frequently in The Ant and the Aardvark, Tijuana Toads, and Roland and Ratfink; last episode to be made during the golden age of animation; seventh episode to have laugh tracks; last cartoon that Tom O'Loughlin does the backgrounds.

== 1970s ==
=== 1971 ===
No. overall	No. in year	Title	Directed by	Original release date
63	1	A Fly in the Pink	Hawley Pratt	June 23, 1971
A scientifically-enhanced fruit fly escapes from a laboratory and attacks the Pink Panther's apple orchard, and so the Panther attempts to get rid of it. Note: The news anchor's voice is provided by editor Joe Siracusa. There is a subtle difference in the Pink Panther's appearance, due to the influence of animator Bob Richardson. The Little Man does not appear.
64	2	Pink Blue Plate	Gerry Chiniquy	July 18, 1971
The Pink Panther gets a job working at a busy café, owned by the Little Man, beside a building site, whose workers frequent the restaurant. However, the Pink Panther has trouble serving food to one particularly grumpy construction worker. Note: Features music recycled from The Pink Blueprint.
65	3	Pink Tuba-Dore	Art Davis	August 4, 1971
An alpine village is home to the Little Man, whose incessant tuba playing annoys the entire community. After being threatened with eviction, he and his dog head for the Alps to play in seclusion, unknowingly disturbing the Pink Panther's sleep. While the Pink Panther resorts to different methods to stop the noise, the man persists in playing and blames his dog for the failed attempts. Note: Eighth Pink Panther short to have laugh tracks in its frequent reruns.
66	4	Pink Pranks	Gerry Chiniquy	August 28, 1971
On a trip to Rome, Italy, the Pink Panther instead ends up in Nome, Alaska, where he meets a friendly seal, a hostile polar bear, and an Inuk hunter (the Little Man) who is trying to catch the seal for its fur. Note: Last Pink Panther cartoon animated by Manny Perez.
67	5	The Pink Flea	Gerry Chiniquy	September 15, 1971
The Pink Panther is pestered by a flea and repeatedly tries to get rid of it. Note: The Little Man does not appear.
68	6	Psst Pink	Art Davis	September 15, 1971
While changing his car's tire, the Pink Panther loses his spare tire and chases after it throughout the town. Note: The Little Man appears briefly.
69	7	Gong with the Pink	Hawley Pratt	October 20, 1971
The Pink Panther takes a job as a waiter at Gong Ho, a Chinese restaurant that places orders by gong beats; however, his gong-banging causes mayhem for the Little Man, who owns a glass shop located above the restaurant. Note: Final Pink Panther cartoon directed by series co-creator Hawley Pratt, and ninth episode to have laugh tracks in its frequent reruns.
70	8	Pink-In	Art Davis	October 20, 1971
The Pink Panther reads some old letters from his army friend Loud-Mouth Louie (voiced by Marvin Miller), which are reminiscent of various antics that the Panther has gotten into. Note: First clip show entry; recycles footage from G.I. Pink, Pink in the Clink, Pink Pajamas, Pickled Pink and The Pink Package Plot.

=== 1972 ===
No. overall	No. in year	Title	Directed by	Original release date
71	1	Pink 8 Ball	Gerry Chiniquy	February 6, 1972
As the Pink Panther is gift-wrapping a basketball, it bounces out of his apartment window, and so the Panther pursues the bouncing ball through the city, trying to retrieve it. Note: The Little Man appears briefly.

=== 1974 ===
No. overall	No. in year	Title	Directed by	Original release date
72	1	Pink Aye	Gerry Chiniquy	May 16, 1974
Disguised as a famous opera singer's fur pelt, the Pink Panther stows away on the S.S. Luxitania, only to be chased around by the ship's waiter (The Little Man). Note: Tenth episode to have laugh tracks in its frequent reruns.
73	2	Trail of the Lonesome Pink	Gerry Chiniquy	June 27, 1974
With the help of some snapping turtles, the Pink Panther plays tricks on fur trappers Jacques and Jules (both bearing the appearance of the Little Man) after his tail gets snagged in one of their foothold traps. Note: Eleventh and final episode to have laugh tracks in its frequent reruns.

=== 1975 ===
No. overall	No. in year	Title	Directed by	Original release date
74	1	Pink DaVinci	Robert McKimson	June 23, 1975
Leonardo da Vinci (the Little Man) plans to paint the Mona Lisa with a pouting mouth, but the Pink Panther insists on a smile, which he constantly draws on the painting when da Vinci isn't looking. As da Vinci repeatedly attempts to repaint the frown, the Panther strikes back by repainting the smile. Note: Features music recycled from We Give Pink Stamps, Pickled Pink, Dial "P" for Pink, and Pink Ice.
75	2	Pink Streaker	Gerry Chiniquy	June 27, 1975
At a winter resort, the Little Man repeatedly tries to teach himself how to ski, but his fellow resort patron, the Pink Panther, unintentionally thwarts him every time. Note: A unique, abridged opening sequence and closing sequence are featured on most television airings; features music recycled from Pink Ice.
76	3	Salmon Pink	Gerry Chiniquy	July 25, 1975
The Pink Panther meets a friendly salmon at the beach and keeps him as a pet. Note: The Little Man does not appear; features music recycled from Pink Ice and Pickled Pink.
77	4	Forty Pink Winks	Gerry Chiniquy	August 8, 1975
Trying to find somewhere to sleep, the Pink Panther sneaks into the Ritz Plaza Hotel, but has to avoid the hotel detective (the Little Man). Note: First cartoon in the series where the panther is given a new red outline by tracing it with either a brush or pen; features music recycled from Pickled Pink and Pink Ice.
78	5	Pink Plasma	Art Leonardi	August 8, 1975
While hiking in Transylvania, the Pink Panther accidentally encounters Count Dracula (the Little Man) in his haunted castle. Note: Director Art Leonardi voices both the laughing skull and the monster; one of few cartoons to reuse music from Pink Panic.
79	6	Pink Elephant	Gerry Chiniquy	October 20, 1975
An elephant follows the Pink Panther home from the zoo, and so our hero tries to hide the pachyderm from the public so that he will not be accused of stealing it. As he takes it home to his apartment, the apartment complex manager (the Little Man) begins to grow suspicious. Note: Features music recycled from Pickled Pink, Pink Ice and Dial "P" for Pink.
80	7	Keep Our Forests' Pink	Gerry Chiniquy	November 20, 1975
As a park ranger, the Pink Panther keeps a forest park clean, despite the constant littering of one camper (the Little Man). Note: The onscreen title includes a grammatically incorrect apostrophe; features music recycled from Pickled Pink.
81	8	Bobolink Pink	Gerry Chiniquy	December 30, 1975
The Pink Panther tries to teach a baby bird to fly. Note: The Little Man does not appear; features music recycled from Pickled Pink and We Give Pink Stamps.
82	9	It's Pink, But Is It Mink?	Robert McKimson	December 30, 1975
Jane sends Tarzan (the Little Man) to catch the Pink Panther so that she can make pink clothing from his fur. Note: Features music recycled from Pickled Pink and Dial "P" for Pink.
83	10	Pink Campaign	Art Leonardi	December 30, 1975
The Pink Panther steals the house of a lumberjack (the Little Man) piece by piece in revenge for the lumberjack's cutting down his treehouse home. Note: Features music recycled from Dial "P" for Pink and Pickled Pink.
84	11	The Scarlet Pinkernel	Gerry Chiniquy	December 30, 1975
Inspired by The Scarlet Pimpernel, the Pink Panther decides to rescue dogs captured by the local dog catcher (the Little Man), though he gets more than he bargained for when he encounters some of the more aggressive dogs. Note: Features music recycled from Pickled Pink.

=== 1976 ===
No. overall	No. in year	Title	Directed by	Original release date
85	1	Mystic Pink	Robert McKimson	January 6, 1976
The Pink Panther finds a magician's top hat, complete with a large rabbit who follows him around. Note: The Little Man appears briefly; one of few cartoons to reuse music from Pink Panic.
86	2	The Pink of Arabee	Gerry Chiniquy	March 13, 1976
While the Pink Panther visits the Middle East, his tail becomes the object of affection for a magic rope belonging to a pungi player; the Pink Panther tries to flee from the rope, which continues to go after his tail. Note: Reissued as The Pink of Bagdad in 1978; features one-time music cues composed by an uncredited Doug Goodwin: the Little Man does not appear.
87	3	The Pink Pro	Robert McKimson	April 12, 1976
The Pink Panther teaches a reluctant Little Man various sports, such as archery, skiing, sailing, sky diving, water skiing and golf. Note: Features music recycled from We Give Pink Stamps.
88	4	Pink Piper	Cullen Houghtaling	April 30, 1976
In a parody of the Pied Piper, the Pink Panther works as the "Pink Piper", and attempts to lead a mouse out of the Little Man's house, only to grow attached to that mouse; when the Little Man, unsatisfied with the Pink Piper's services, tries to kill the mouse himself via methods such as mousetraps and a cat, the Pink Piper attempts to save the mouse's life. Note: The only Pink Panther cartoon directed by Cullen Blaine (credited as Cullen Houghtaling). Doug Goodwin provides the musical sound effects as well as the Pink Piper's magical pipe; features music recycled from Pickled Pink and Dial "P" for Pink.
89	5	Pinky Doodle	Sid Marcus	May 28, 1976
During the American Revolution, the Pink Panther is sent to notify townsfolk that the Redcoats are coming. He attempts to ride an uncooperative horse who is on the side of the Redcoats, who repeatedly thwarts his efforts. Note: Reissued as Yankee Doodle Pink in 1978. The Little Man does not appear; features music recycled from Pickled Pink.
90	6	Sherlock Pink	Robert McKimson	June 29, 1976
The Pink Panther becomes a detective to identify who stole his breakfast cake (which he actually ate in his sleep), but instead finds a crook (the Little Man) and chases him through a surreal house. Note: One of few cartoons to reuse music from Pink Panic; features music recycled from Pink Ice. Last Pink Panther cartoon directed by Robert McKimson.
91	7	Rocky Pink	Art Leonardi	July 9, 1976
Unable to afford a dog, the Pink Panther ends up adopting a pet rock, which surprisingly turns out to be more trouble than it is worth. Note: Reissued as Pet Pink Pebbles in 1978; features music recycled from We Give Pink Stamps and Pickled Pink, last Pink Panther cartoon directed by Art Leonardi.

=== 1977 ===
No. overall	No. in year	Title	Directed by	Original release date
92	1	Therapeutic Pink	Gerry Chiniquy	April 1, 1977
The Pink Panther tries to get a biting dog removed from his tail at the hospital. Note: Final theatrical Pink Panther entry; last entry to utilize both Walter Greene and William Lava's music scores; features music recycled from Pink Ice and Dial "P" for Pink; only cartoon released by DePatie-Freleng Enterprises in 1977, but was produced in 1975 according to the short's copyright date.

=== 1978–1980 (TV) ===
The following made-for-television entries were produced for The All New Pink Panther Show in 1978. Initially premiering on television in late 1978, they were all later released theatrically ("Pink U.F.O." and "Pink Press" are the exceptions). New music cues were composed by Steve DePatie, son of series producer David H. DePatie.

No. overall	No. in year	Title	Directed by	Original release date
93	1	Pink Pictures	Gerry Chiniquy	Television: October 21, 1978; Theatrical: October 21, 1978
The Pink Panther decides to become an amateur photographer and heads to the forest to take pictures of the wildlife; unfortunately for him, the animals are not cooperative. Note: Partial remake of Smile Pretty, Say Pink. The Little Man does not appear. First cartoon scored by Steve DePatie (uncredited for all of his scores outside of the end credits of The All-New Pink Panther Show).
94	2	Pink Arcade	Sid Marcus	Television: September 16, 1978; Theatrical: October 25, 1978
The Pink Panther visits an amusement arcade after getting tons of quarters from a broken weight machine. However, the arcade machines cause mishaps to the panther whenever he plays them.
95	3	Pink Lemonade	Gerry Chiniquy	Television: November 4, 1978; Theatrical: November 4, 1978
Taking refuge from the local dog catcher, the Pink Panther stumbles into the Little Man's house, where he pretends to be the daughter's latest stuffed animal, as a means to hide from both the Little Man and his aggressive dog.
96	4	Pink Trumpet	Art Davis	Television: November 4, 1978; Theatrical: November 4, 1978
Staying in a motel, the Pink Panther decides to practice his trumpet playing, which annoys the Little Man, who is staying at the motel room next door. Note: Partial remake of Pink Tuba-Dore.
97	5	Sprinkle Me Pink	Bob Richardson	Television: November 11, 1978; Theatrical: November 11, 1978
Trying to have a picnic, the Pink Panther tries to escape a small cloud that keeps following and raining on him. Note: Only Pink Panther cartoon directed by Bob Richardson.
98	6	Dietetic Pink	Sid Marcus	Television: November 11, 1978; Theatrical: November 11, 1978
After the Pink Panther believes he weighs 220 pounds after stepping on a scale (as there was a heavy suitcase resting on the scale at the time), he decides to go on a strict diet, but he has trouble controlling his impulses at first. Note: The Little Man does not appear.
99	7	Pink U.F.O.	Dave Detiege	Television: December 16, 1978; Theatrical: November 16, 1978
The Pink Panther catches what he thinks is a butterfly for his collection, but it turns out to be a small UFO that causes trouble around the Panther's house. Note: The Little Man does not appear; one of two cartoons to be released theatrically before television.
100	8	Pink Lightning	Brad Case	Television: October 14, 1978; Theatrical: November 17, 1978
In a parody of Dr. Jekyll and Mr. Hyde, The Pink Panther buys Dr. Jekyll's old car, which he cannot control due to the doctor's Hyde formula in its gas tank. Note: Partial remake of Pink Pistons; 100th Pink Panther short, and the first cartoon directed by Brad Case. The Little Man does not appear.
101	9	Cat and the Pinkstalk	Dave Detiege	Television: November 18, 1978; Theatrical: November 18, 1978
In a parody of Jack and the Beanstalk, The Pink Panther sells his cow for some beans and grows a large beanstalk; the Panther then climbs it and finds a castle in the clouds, where he faces the angry giant who dwells there.
102	10	Pink Daddy	Gerry Chiniquy	Television: November 18, 1978; Theatrical: November 18, 1978
While delivering babies, the stork gets lost in a thunderstorm and accidentally delivers a baby crocodile to the Pink Panther's home, leaving the unhappy Panther to care for it. Note: Partial remake of Congratulations It's Pink.
103	11	Pink S.W.A.T.	Sid Marcus	Television: September 16, 1978; Theatrical: November 22, 1978
The Pink Panther attempts to get rid of a fly in his home. Note: Last of the five cartoons where the panther battles a pestering insect; the Little Man does not appear.
104	12	Pink and Shovel	Gerry Chiniquy	Television: November 25, 1978; Theatrical: November 25, 1978
The Pink Panther finds a $5.00 bill, and buries it out of fear it may be stolen. However, he has trouble digging it up again, as it turns out that a hotel has been built on top of the spot where he buried it.
105	13	Pinkologist	Gerry Chiniquy	Television: December 2, 1978; Theatrical: December 2, 1978
The Little Man visits a psychiatrist, having been driven to insanity by the Pink Panther. He recalls several times when the Panther had pestered him. Note: Second clip show entry. Recycles clips from Rock A Bye Pinky, The Pink Blueprint and Pink Posies; the title is a pun of the word “psychologist”.
106	14	Yankee Doodle Pink	Sid Marcus	Television: December 2, 1978; Theatrical: December 2, 1978
During the American Revolution, the Pink Panther is sent to notify townsfolk that the Redcoats are coming. He attempts to ride an uncooperative horse who is on the side of the Redcoats, who repeatedly thwarts his efforts. Note: Reissue of Pinky Doodle refitted with Steve DePatie's music cues and a few new scenes; the Little Man does not appear.
107	15	Pink Press	Art Davis	Television: December 16, 1978; Theatrical: December 9, 1978
As a Daily Blabbermouth reporter, the Pink Panther tries to get past the security officer (the Little Man) and his guard dog at the mansion of the ironically-named Howard Huge, in order to secure an interview with him. Note: Second and last Pink Panther cartoon to be released theatrically before television
108	16	Pet Pink Pebbles	Gerry Chiniquy, Art Leonardi (uncredited)	Television: December 9, 1978; Theatrical: December 9, 1978
Unable to afford a dog, the Pink Panther ends up adopting a pet rock, which surprisingly turns out to be more trouble than it is worth. Note: Reissue of Rocky Pink refitted with Steve DePatie's music cues and a few new scenes.
109	17	The Pink of Bagdad	Art Davis, Gerry Chiniquy (uncredited)	Television: December 9, 1978; Theatrical: December 9, 1978
While the Pink Panther visits the Middle East, his tail becomes the object of affection for a magic rope belonging to a pungi player; the Pink Panther tries to flee from the rope, which continues to go after his tail. Note: Reissue of The Pink of Arabee refitted with Steve DePatie's music cues and a few new scenes; the Little Man does not appear; this is the last cartoon in the series where the Pink Panther has a black outline.
110	18	Pink in the Drink	Sid Marcus	Television: October 14, 1978; Theatrical: December 20, 1978
The Pink Panther is scammed by a South Sea cruise, which turns out to be a trap set up by a pirate (the Little Man) who forces the Panther to either do his bidding or walk the plank. Note: Partial remake of Pink in the Clink; the plot is reused from Mutiny on the Bunny (1950), while the ending is reused from Rabbitson Crusoe (1956).
111	19	Pink Bananas	Art Davis	Television: September 9, 1978; Theatrical: December 22, 1978
In the jungle, the Pink Panther encounters a ferocious gorilla that suddenly dances whenever he hears music. Note: Partial remake of It's Pink, But Is It Mink?. The Little Man does not appear.
112	20	Pinktails for Two	Art Davis	Television: September 9, 1978; Theatrical: December 22, 1978
The Pink Panther's tail grows to enormous proportions after it comes into contact with a "Speedy-Grow" plant fertilizer. Note: The Blue Racer makes a cameo appearance.
113	21	Pink Z-Z-Z	Sid Marcus	Television: December 23, 1978; Theatrical: December 23, 1978
A constantly-meowing alley cat keeps the Pink Panther awake at night. Note: The Little Man does not appear.
114	22	Star Pink	Art Davis	Television: December 23, 1978; Theatrical: December 23, 1978
The Pink Panther operates a gas station for spaceships and ends up battling a space villain (the Little Man). Note: Partial reference of the 1977 film Star Wars.
115	23	Pink Breakfast	Brad Case	Television: October 7, 1978; Theatrical: February 1, 1979
The Pink Panther struggles to make breakfast in the morning. Note: The Little Man does not appear.
116	24	Pink Quackers	Brad Case	Television: November 25, 1978; Theatrical: April 4, 1979
The Pink Panther adopts a wind-up duck as a house pet.
117	25	Toro Pink	Sid Marcus	Television: September 30, 1978; Theatrical: April 4, 1979
When a matador chickens out just before a bullfight at an arena, the Pink Panther is brought in as a replacement, only to get more than he bargained for when he faces a particularly dangerous bull. Note: Partial remake of Bully for Pink, it also marks the last time the Little Man appears all white.
118	26	String Along in Pink	Gerry Chiniquy	Television: October 28, 1978; Theatrical: April 12, 1979
The Pink Panther follows a seemingly endless piece of string.
119	27	Pink in the Woods	Brad Case	Television: September 30, 1978; Theatrical: April 27, 1979
The Pink Panther once again takes a job as a lumberjack, but he clashes with his stern, short-tempered boss (the Little Man). Note: Partial remake of Pink is a Many Splintered Thing.
120	28	Pink Pull	Sid Marcus	Television: September 23, 1978; Theatrical: June 15, 1979
After the Pink Panther accidentally drops a quarter down a sewer grate, he tries to use a giant magnet to retrieve it, only to unintentionally get himself into more trouble due to the magnet's strong pull. Note: The Little Man does not appear.
121	29	Spark Plug Pink	Brad Case (uncredited)	Television: October 7, 1978; Theatrical: June 28, 1979
The Pink Panther needs a new spark plug to start his lawn mower, but when his replacement falls into a yard guarded by an aggressive bulldog, he must try to find a way to safely retrieve it. Note: The Little Man does not appear.
122	30	Doctor Pink	Sid Marcus	Television: October 21, 1978; Theatrical: November 16, 1979
As a hospital janitor, the Pink Panther takes up first aid, much to the chagrin of the actual doctor (the Little Man). Note: Partial remake of The Pink Pill
123	31	Pink Suds	Art Davis	Television: September 23, 1978; Theatrical: December 19, 1979
The Pink Panther goes to the launderette, where he unintentionally causes misfortune to his fellow customer, the Little Man.
124	32	Supermarket Pink	Brad Case	Television: October 28, 1978; Theatrical: February 1, 1980
Having run out of food, the Pink Panther goes to shop at Tony's Supermarket to buy food, where he unintentionally bedevils an employee (the Little Man) as he shops. Note: Final short of the original Pink Panther cartoons. Last cartoon directed by Brad Case. Last cartoon scored by Steve DePatie. Last cartoon released by United Artists.
