= Bob Richardson (animator) =

American animator

Bob Richardson is a film animator, director and producer.

He is the writer/illustrator of books The Book Beetles: Who's Been Eating Our Books (2021) and The Awesome Adventures of the Laboratory (Lab) Lizards (2022).

== Career ==
Richardson has seven Emmy Award nominations and has won five times for the following projects.

- Tutenstein - Outstanding Special Class Animated Program - 2004
- Muppet Babies - Outstanding Animated Program - 1985, 1986, 1987, 1988

== Selected animated works ==
=== Film ===
- The Jungle Book (1967) assistant animator
- Heavy Traffic (1973) animator
- Pink Panther Theatrical Shorts (1975-1979) animator
- Capricorn One (1977) FX animator
- Ultimate Avengers: The Movie (2006) producer and supervising director
- Ultimate Avengers 2 (2006) producer and supervising director

=== Television ===
- My World and Welcome to It (1969-1970) animation director
- The Incredible, Indelible, Magical, Physical Mystery Trip (1973) animator
- The Magical Mystery Trip Through Little Red's Head (1974) animator
- Pontoffel Pock, Where Are You? (1980) animator
- The Grinch Grinches the Cat in the Hat (1982) animator
- Dr. Seuss on the Loose (1973) storyboard artist, animator
- Spider-Woman (1979-1980) director
- Dennis the Menace in Mayday for Mother (1981) director
- The Charmkins (1983) producer and director
- Meatballs and Spaghetti (1982) producer and director
- Dungeons & Dragons (1983) producer and director
- Rude Dog and the Dweebs (1989) producer
- Muppet Babies (1984-1990) supervising producer, producer, and animation director
- Cro (1993-1994) producer and director
- Spider-Man: The Animated Series (1994-1998) supervising producer and director
- Max Steel (2000-2002) producer and director
- Tutenstein (2003-2005) director
