= List of animated feature films of the 1970s =

Lists of animated feature films released in the 1970s organized by year of release:

- List of animated feature films of 1970
- List of animated feature films of 1971
- List of animated feature films of 1972
- List of animated feature films of 1973
- List of animated feature films of 1974
- List of animated feature films of 1975
- List of animated feature films of 1976
- List of animated feature films of 1977
- List of animated feature films of 1978
- List of animated feature films of 1979
