= Doug Goodwin =

American football player (born 1942)

No. 35, 30
- Position: Running back

Personal information
- Born: March 11, 1942 (age 84); Charleston, South Carolina, U.S.
- Died: May 11, 2019
- Listed height: 6 ft 2 in (1.88 m)
- Listed weight: 228 lb (103 kg)

Career information
- High school: Burke (Charleston)
- College: Maryland Eastern Shore
- NFL draft: 1965: 5th round, 66th overall pick
- AFL draft: 1965: 11th round, 88th overall pick

Career history
- Buffalo Bills (1966); Atlanta Falcons (1968)

Career NFL statistics
- Games played: 5
- Stats at Pro Football Reference

Douglas McAuthur Goodwin (born March 11, 1942) is an American former professional football player who was a running back for two seasons in the American Football League (AFL) and National Football League (NFL). He played college football for the Maryland Eastern Shore Hawks. He was selected by the Green Bay Packers in the fifth round of the 1965 NFL draft, and selected by the Buffalo Bills in the eleventh round of the 1965 AFL draft. He spent one season with the Bills and another in the NFL with the Atlanta Falcons.
