= Roland and Rattfink =

American series of animated shorts

- First appearance: Hawks and Doves (1968)
- Created by: David DePatie; Friz Freleng

In-universe information
- Gender: Males

Roland and Rattfink is an American series of animated shorts produced and released from 1968 to 1971. The main characters also made several guest appearances on The Pink Panther animated series. The series was produced by David H. DePatie and Friz Freleng and seventeen cartoons were produced.

== Plot ==
The cartoons concerned blond, muscular, handsome, pacifist "good guy" Roland and the many attempts by the evil, weedy, green-skinned (in most of the cartoons), mustachioed Rattfink to defeat or dispose of him.

Roland and Rattfink were both voiced by Lennie Weinrib (except in "The Deadwood Thunderball" where they were voiced by John Byner and Dave Barry).

"Hurts and Flowers" (one long, running joke about Rattfink destroying flower child Roland's daisies) concludes with Rattfink getting killed and Roland leaving a daisy in a flowerpot on his grave. When Roland walks away, Rattfink's ghost rises from the grave to throw the flowerpot at him.

== Filmography ==
No.	Title	Directed by	Story by	Original release date
1	"Hawks and Doves"	Hawley Pratt	John W. Dunn	December 18, 1968
Rattfink, the warmongering leader of Hawkland, declares war on the peaceloving nation of Doveland, and Doveland's hero, Roland, must defend his country.
2	"Hurts and Flowers"	Hawley Pratt	John W. Dunn	February 11, 1969
Flower-power child Roland is determined to spread peace and love but no matter how much he tries, hate-loving Rattfink isn't having any of it.
3	"Flying Feet"	Gerry Chiniquy	Irv Spector	April 10, 1969
Clean-living Roland represents Old P.U. against chain-smoking and cheating Rattfink from Doggone U. in the Cross Country Run finals.
4	"The Deadwood Thunderball"	Hawley Pratt	John W. Dunn	June 6, 1969
Engineer Roland drives his train on the inaugural run of the Dodge City-Deadwood line, but bad guy Rattfink, representing the crooked stage line, is hired to stop him.
5	"Sweet and Sourdough"	Art Davis	John W. Dunn	June 25, 1969
In the 1897 Yukon Territory, Mountie Roland is on the trail of bank robber Rattfink.
6	"A Pair of Sneakers"	Art Davis	John W. Dunn	September 17, 1969
Good spy Roland must deliver a top-secret message and bad spy Rattfink is determined to steal it.
7	"Say Cheese, Please"	Art Davis	John W. Dunn	June 7, 1970
Rattfink is fed up with playing "villain" to Roland's "hero", so he demands to star in a film as the "hero" while Roland is made his "stand-in".
8	"A Taste of Money"	Art Davis	Unknown	June 24, 1970
When he reads about a widow inheriting $5,000,000, Rattfink is determined to marry her for her money, but married life doesn't turn out like he hopes. NOTE: Roland does not appear in this film.
9	"The Foul Kin"	Grant Simmons	Sid Marcus	August 5, 1970
Rattfink is totally broke, so he's determined to get on his filthy-rich 100-year-old uncle Rotten Rattfink's good side in hopes of a large inheritance.
10	"Bridgework"	Art Davis	Dale Hale	August 26, 1970
Engineer Roland is instructed to build a bridge using only high-quality materials, so Rattfink tries to destroy it so his uncle's firm can sell the city low-quality materials at high-quality prices.
11	"Robin Goodhood"	Gerry Chiniquy	John W. Dunn	September 9, 1970
In parody of Robin Hood Roland Hood steals the money from tax collector Rattfink to give to the poor, but Rattfink keeps stealing it back to give to the rich.
12	"War and Pieces"	Art Davis	Sid Marcus	September 20, 1970
Pirate Rattfink is terrorizing the seven seas, so Captain Roland is sent to capture him.
13	"Gem Dandy"	Gerry Chiniquy	Dale Hale	October 25, 1970
Museum Guard Roland protects a priceless diamond while jewel thief Rattfink keeps trying to steal it.
14	"Trick or Retreat"	Art Davis	Sid Marcus	March 3, 1971
In the Old West, Sergeant Roland is left to guard the fort alone so Renegade Rattfink stirs up the Indians to attack.
15	"The Great Continental Overland Cross-Country Race"	Art Davis	John W. Dunn	May 23, 1971
In 1901, Roland Righteous and Rattfink Rodent compete in the Annual Pettybone University's Overland Cross Country car race, but Roland's locomotive car just can't seem to make it out of the starting blocks.
16	"A Fink in the Rink"	Art Davis	John W. Dunn	July 4, 1971
At a roller-skating rink, novice skater Roland enjoys himself, but experienced skater Rattfink doesn't because Roland keeps causing him to have "accidents".
17	"Cattle Battle"	Art Davis	John W. Dunn	August 4, 1971
Singing cowboy Roland is guarding a herd of cattle and rustler Rattfink keeps trying to steal it.

== Home video ==
The series was released January 27, 2009 on DVD from MGM Home Entertainment/20th Century Fox Home Entertainment as a part of The Pink Panther Classic Cartoon Collection. The individual shorts were released on DVD and Blu-Ray on June 28, 2016 by Kino Lorber, and are also available to stream on Hulu.

== See also ==
- List of The Pink Panther cartoons
