= David H. DePatie =

American film and television producer (1929–2021)

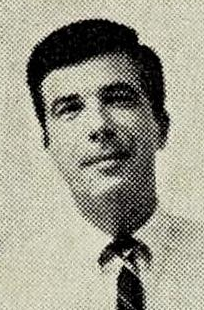
- DePatie in 1965
- Born: David Hudson DePatie; December 24, 1929; Los Angeles, California, U.S.
- Died: September 23, 2021 (aged 91); Gig Harbor, Washington, U.S.
- Other name: Dave DePatie
- Occupations: Producer, businessman (founder of DFE and Marvel Productions)
- Years active: 1957–1985
- Children: 3
- Father: Edmond L. DePatie

David Hudson DePatie (/dəˈpæti/; December 24, 1929 – September 23, 2021) was an American film and television producer. He was the last and longest-lived executive in charge of the original Warner Bros. Cartoons studio. He also formed DePatie–Freleng Enterprises with Friz Freleng and was an executive producer at Marvel Productions before leaving the company and working briefly at Hanna-Barbera Productions.

== Early life ==
DePatie was born on Christmas Eve 1929, at The Good Samaritan Hospital in Los Angeles. His father, Edmond L. DePatie, was the head of the counter department at Warner Bros, and he would spend his entire career at Warner, and later became executive vice president and general manager of the studio, reporting only to Jack Warner. Because of this, David, in his own words, became a "Warner Brat".

== Career ==
=== Warner Bros. Cartoons ===
Leon Schlesinger was the production executive of Leon Schlesinger Productions until his retirement in 1944 when Warner Bros. Pictures bought the animation department and renamed it to Warner Bros. Cartoons, Inc. Eddie Selzer then became the production executive until 1958. John W. Burton then became producer for a few years until Burton accepted a position of another company that Leon Schlesinger founded called Pacific Title and Art. DePatie became production executive in 1960, taking over for Burton. The first thing he produced for the studio was a 1963 pilot named Philbert and it was directed by Friz Freleng, but was never picked up, and was the last cartoon produced by the company.

In 1962, with the decline in moviegoing, DePatie was informed that the cartoon studio was going to be shut down. Shortly afterwards when Warner Bros. Cartoons closed down in 1963, significant production changes occurred for new Warner Bros. cartoons produced by the newly formed DePatie–Freleng Enterprises. DePatie received on-screen production credit and cartoon director Friz Freleng was promoted to producer. Chuck Jones left for Tom and Jerry theatricals and television adaptations. Character appearances were limited to Daffy Duck, Sylvester the Cat, Speedy Gonzales, and Wile E. Coyote and the Road Runner, with one time appearances of Granny, Porky Pig, The Goofy Gophers, and Witch Hazel. Production was subcontracted to Format Films.

=== DePatie–Freleng Enterprises ===
While he held his production position at Warner Bros., DePatie originally received no on-screen credit, similar to his two predecessors after Leon Schlesinger retired in 1944. In 1963, he began to receive on-screen credit with new producer (and former director) Friz Freleng. Around this time, they formed DePatie–Freleng Enterprises, also known as DePatie–Freleng Entertainment, and known on-screen as "DFE Films". Due to the success of the Pink Panther shorts, or in Art Leonardi's words the "Pink Power", they made title sequences for various TV shows, including I Dream of Jeannie and various commercials.

=== The Pink Panther ===
DePatie and Freleng animated opening segments for some of Pink Panther feature films. In these, a Pink Panther appeared in the opening credits as the villain. Music was scored by Henry Mancini. The character would appear in many animated shorts of his own (no longer as the villain) due to his critical acclaim in the title sequence, also produced by DePatie–Freleng. When these shorts aired on television, they were paired with backup segments. Music was composed by William Lava, Walter Greene, Doug Goodwin and David DePatie's son Steve DePatie. These cartoons were directed by many people including Arthur Davis, Robert McKimson, Hawley Pratt, and Gerry Chiniquy.

=== Dr. Seuss television specials ===
Chuck Jones was producing Dr. Seuss specials for Metro-Goldwyn-Mayer, until MGM shut down its animation studio. DePatie–Freleng picked up production of The Cat in the Hat. Music was composed by Dean Elliott for four Dr. Seuss specials, Hawley Pratt directed three specials, and Maurice Noble was production designer for three specials. Chuck Jones co-produced with Ted Geisel while DePatie and Freleng were executive producers for The Cat in the Hat only. Since Jones was working for ABC, he stopped working on Dr. Seuss specials. Freleng and Ted Geisel became producer but were credited separately. DePatie was the only one credited as executive producer. Music was scored by Joe Raposo for three later specials. DePatie–Freleng's last Dr. Seuss special was The Grinch Grinches the Cat in the Hat, which was around the time that DFE became part of Cadence Industries, and rebranded as Marvel Productions.

=== Marvel Productions ===
DePatie and some of his production staff worked for Marvel Productions. He was an executive producer. He left the company in 1984, and then briefly worked for Hanna-Barbera, producing Pink Panther and Sons, before retiring.

== Death ==
DePatie died of natural causes in Gig Harbor, Washington, on September 23, 2021, at age 91.
