= 5th Canadian Comedy Awards =

Festival and awards ceremony for works of 2003

- Date: 2004
- Location: London, Ontario
- Country: Canada
- Presented by: Canadian Comedy Foundation for Excellence
- Hosted by: Scott Thompson

Highlights
- Most wins: Television: Corner Gas (3); Film: Eugene Levy / A Mighty Wind (2)
- Most nominations: Television: Corner Gas (7); Film: Mambo Italiano (6)
- Website: www.canadiancomedyawards.org

The 5th Canadian Comedy Awards, presented by the Canadian Comedy Foundation for Excellence (CCFE), honoured the best live, television, and film comedy of 2003. The ceremony was held in 2004 in London, Ontario, concluding the Canadian Comedy Awards Festival. The ceremony was hosted by Scott Thompson.

Canadian Comedy Awards, also known as Beavers, were awarded in 19 categories. Winners were picked by members of ACTRA (Alliance of Canadian Cinema, Television and Radio Artists), the Canadian Actors' Equity Association, the Writers Guild of Canada, the Directors Guild of Canada, and the Comedy Association.

TV series Corner Gas led with seven nominations followed by the films Mambo Italiano and Expecting with six apiece. Corner Gas won three Beavers, followed by Expecting and A Mighty Wind with two each. This ceremony also introduced the Chairman's Award which recognized the contributions of Mark Breslin, founder of Yuk Yuk's comedy clubs.

== Winners and nominees ==
Winners are listed first and highlighted in boldface:

=== Live ===
Best Male Stand-up	Best Female Stand-up	Best Stand-up Newcomer
**Derek Edwards**; Alex Nussbaum; Gerry Dee; Mike Wilmot; Russell Peters	**Laurie Elliott**; Jo-Anna Downey; Kate Davis; Martha Chaves; Shannon Laverty	**Ron Sparks**; Brian Lazanik; Terry Clement; Tommy Campbell; Trevor Boris
Best Male Improviser		Best Female Improviser
**Paul Bates**; Albert Howell; Derek Flores; Kerry Griffin; Peter Oldring		**Janet van de Graaf**; Becky Johnson; Diana Frances; Jane Luk; Rebecca Northan
Best Sketch Troupe or Company		Best Improv Troupe or Company
**The Minnesota Wrecking Crew**; Scrambled Leggs; Second City Mainstage; The Imponderables; The Sketchersons		**Monkey Toast**; Leave It To Cleavage; Rock Paper Scissors; Slap Happy; Urban Improv
Best One Person Show		Best Comedic Play, Revue or Series
**The Road Between My Ears**; From the Desk of Ron Sparks; Love Girl; The Underbelly Diaries		**The Williamson Playboys**; Arma-Get-It-On; Bush League of Justice; Lost Weekend; Top Gun the Musical

=== Television ===
Best Performance by a Male	Best Performance by a Female
**Brent Butt – Corner Gas**; Winston Spear – Comedy Now!; Eric Peterson – Corner Gas; Dan Redican – Puppets Who Kill; Gavin Crawford – The Gavin Crawford Show	**Marypat Farrell – The Gavin Crawford Show**; Gabrielle Miller – Corner Gas; Janet Wright – Corner Gas; Jessica Holmes – Royal Canadian Air Farce; Laurie Elliott – The Toronto Show
Best Direction in a Series	Best Direction in a Special or Episode
**David Storey, Robert de Lint, Rob King, Henry Sarwer-Foner** and **Mark Farrell – Corner Gas**; Shawn Alex Thompson – Puppets Who Kill; Perry Rosemond – Royal Canadian Air Farce; Ron Murphy – The Gavin Crawford Show; David Storey – The Seán Cullen Show	**Carl Harvey** and **Shelagh O'Brien** – **Sean Cullen: Home for Christmas**; Henry Sarwer-Foner – Corner Gas – "All My X's"; Michael Kennedy – Mental Block – "Danger Boy"; Henry Sarwer-Foner – Rick Mercer Report – "episode 4"
Best Writing in a Series	Best Writing in a Special or Episode
**Mark Farrell, Brent Butt, Andrew Carr** and **Paul Mather** – **Corner Gas**; John Pattison – Puppets Who Kill; Gord Holtam, Rick Olsen, Rob Lindsay, Wayne Testori – Royal Canadian Air Farce; Kyle Tingley, Gavin Crawford, Jennifer Whalen, Alex Pugsley, Cathy Gordon – The Gavin Crawford Show – Define and Tandy; Seán Cullen – The Seán Cullen Show	**Luciano Casimiri, Harry Doupe, Kristeen von Hagen** and **George Westerholm** – **The Toronto Show, episode 7**; David Mesiano, John Catucci – Comedy Now!; Ron James – Ron James: The Road Between My Ears; Seán Cullen – Sean Cullen: Home For Christmas; Jennifer Robertson, Erin Keaney, Geri Hall, Jennifer Whalen – To Die 4

=== Film ===
Best Performance by a Male	Best Performance by a Female
**Eugene Levy – A Mighty Wind**; Don Lake – A Mighty Wind; Colin Mochrie – Expecting; Tom Melissis – Expecting; Luke Kirby – Mambo Italiano	**Debra McGrath – Expecting**; Barbara Radecki – Expecting; Claudia Ferri – Mambo Italiano; Ginette Reno – Mambo Italiano; Mary Walsh – Mambo Italiano
Best Direction	Best Writing
**Deborah Day – Expecting**; Émile Gaudreault – Mambo Italiano	**Eugene Levy – A Mighty Wind**; Valerie Buhagiar, Deborah Day, Angela Gei, Karen Hill, Derwin Jordan, Debra McGrath, Tom Melissis, Colin Mochrie, Karl Pruner, Barbara Radecki, Cindy Stone – Expecting; Émile Gaudreault, Steve Galluccio – Mambo Italiano

=== Special awards ===
Chairman's Award
- **Mark Breslin**

== Multiple wins ==
The following people, shows, films, etc. received multiple awards

Awards	Person or work
3	Corner Gas
2	Eugene Levy / A Mighty Wind
2	Expecting

== Multiple nominations ==
The following people, shows, films, etc. received multiple nominations

Nominations	Person or work
7	Corner Gas
6	Mambo Italiano
5	Expecting
4	The Gavin Crawford Show
3	Royal Canadian Air Farce
2	Comedy Now!
2	Eugene Levy / A Mighty Wind
2	Puppets Who Kill
2	The Seán Cullen Show
