= What a Week =

Canadian Radio Show

What A Week was a Canadian political satire show on CBC Radio One that aired on Saturdays in 2003. Debuting on April 12, 2003, it ran for two 13-episode seasons. Following the satirical tradition of Royal Canadian Air Farce, the program poked fun at the past week's news stories, through impressions, comedy sketches, songs, and editorial commentary.

The show was written by Dean Jenkinson. Other writers included Paul Mather, Al Rae, Jerry Schaefer and George Westerholm, and featured the voices of Tony Daniels, Deann deGruijter, Ray Landry and Ron Rubin.

== Reception ==
Tom Fletcher, editor of the Maple Ridge News in British Columbia, complained about the "western hick" humour which was a recurring theme in CBC programs including What A Week.
