= Luke Kirby =

American-Canadian actor

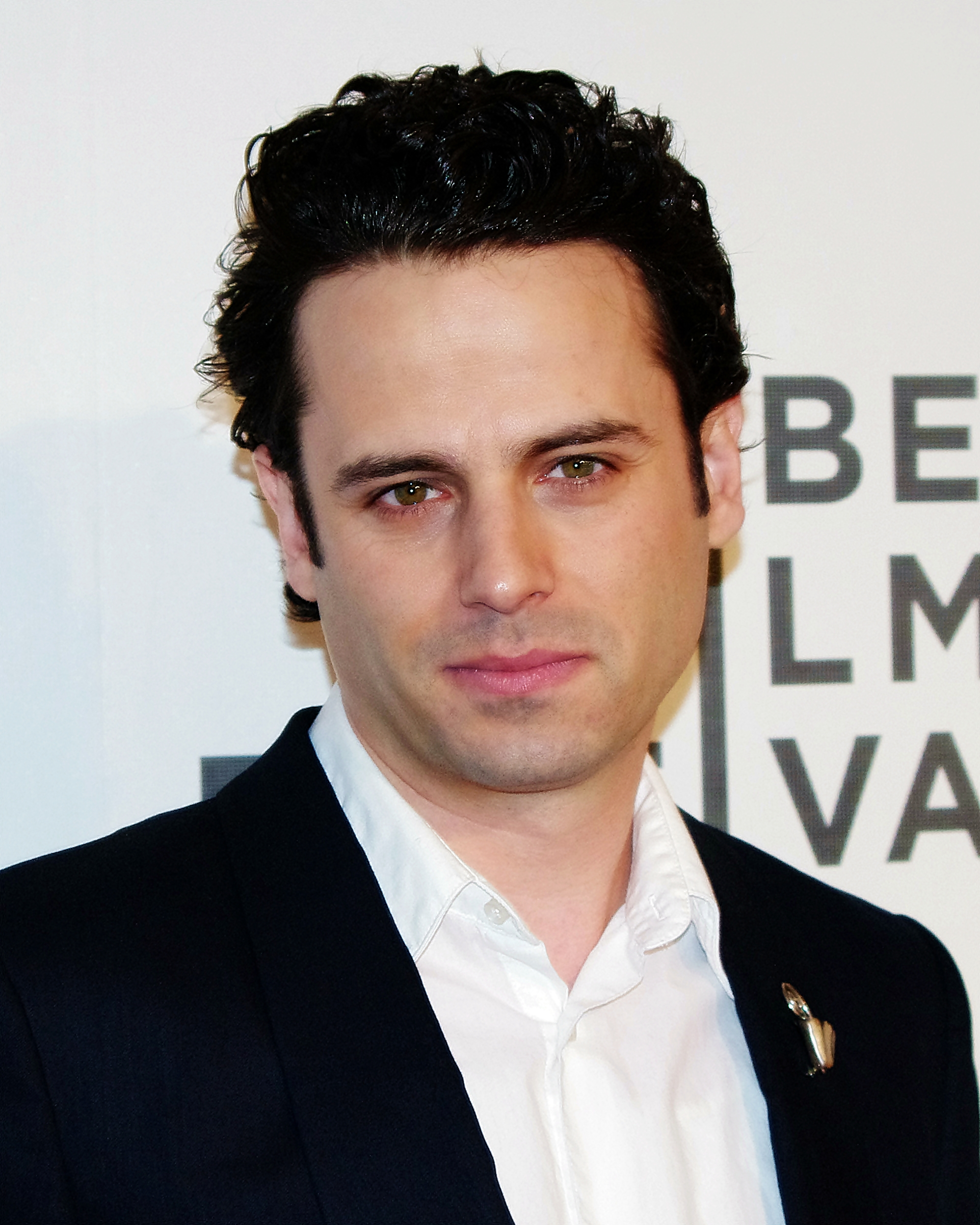
- Kirby in 2012
- Born: Luke Farrell Kirby; June 29, 1978 (age 48); Hamilton, Ontario, Canada
- Education: National Theatre School of Canada
- Occupation: Actor
- Years active: 2000–present

Luke Farrell Kirby (born June 29, 1978) is a Canadian actor. He played the role of Lenny Bruce in the Amazon Prime Video comedy-drama series The Marvelous Mrs. Maisel, for which he received a Primetime Emmy Award for Outstanding Guest Actor in a Comedy Series. In 2024, he starred as Chuck Brooks in the Peabody Award winning film Out of My Mind from Disney+.

== Early life ==
Kirby was born in Hamilton, Ontario, to American parents. His mother is from Brooklyn, New York City, and his father grew up "along the eastern seaboard." His parents moved from New York City to Canada in 1974. He studied drama at the National Theatre School of Canada, a theatre conservatory focusing on classical works, and graduated in 2000.

== Career ==
Kirby has performed since his teens, after he was accepted at The National Theatre School of Canada. He graduated in May 2000, and after two auditions began working on two separate projects: the CBS/Alliance mini-series Haven, and director Léa Pool's feature Lost and Delirious (2001).

Soon after, he portrayed Morgan in the Factory Theatre's production of Geometry in Venice in Toronto, a performance that brought him a Best Actor nomination at the Dora Mavor Moore Awards. This was quickly followed by the role of Patroclus in Theatre for a New Audience's 2001 production of Troilus and Cressida, directed by Peter Hall in New York City.

In 2006, Kirby performed in the Women's Project Theater production of Jump/Cut. His other theatre credits include Judith Thompson's premiere of Habitat at Canadian Stage, and Daniel Brooks premiere of The Good Life at the Tarragon Theatre (both in Toronto). His latest theatre venture was in New York City, where he had the lead role in Defender of the Faith (Irish Repertory Theatre).

Kirby's first feature film role was that of Jake Hollander in Lost and Delirious (2001), followed by Halloween: Resurrection (2002), where he played Jim. His other film credits include lead roles in Peter Wellington's feature Luck and Mambo Italiano directed by Émile Gaudreault. Mambo Italiano received a gala presentation at the 2003 Toronto International Film Festival to a standing ovation, and earned Kirby a Canadian Comedy Award Nomination. He then played a part written for him in the feature film Shattered Glass, produced by Cruise/Wagner. In 2007, he had the lead role of Ray Dokes opposite Rachael Leigh Cook and Keith Carradine in the Canadian feature All Hat. In 2009, he appeared opposite Lindsay Lohan in Labor Pains.

In television, one of Kirby's favourite roles was in the TMN/Showcase mini-series Slings & Arrows, featuring Canadian actors and directed by his friend Peter Wellington. Kirby was nominated for a Gemini Award for his role in Sex Traffic, a mini-series for Channel 4 and CBC that aired in the fall of 2004 under British director David Yates. That year, Kirby received a second Gemini nomination for his guest-star role in the dramatic series The Eleventh Hour. In the fall of 2005, he was a series regular in HBO's Tell Me You Love Me, directed by Patricia Rozema, whose first season aired in September 2007. He starred as Jimmy Burns in the 2009–2010 Canwest Global series Cra$h & Burn.

In 2017, Kirby joined the cast of the award-winning Amazon Prime Video comedy-drama series The Marvelous Mrs. Maisel, portraying comedian Lenny Bruce, for which he received a Primetime Emmy Award for Outstanding Guest Actor in a Comedy Series. In 2025 he played Jack McMillan in the Amazon Prime Video comedy-drama series Étoile.

From December 2019 through January 2020, Kirby starred in the off-Broadway play Judgment Day at New York's Park Avenue Armory.

In 2026, it was announced that Kirby will join the cast of Law & Order Toronto: Criminal Intent in the fourth season as Detective Sergeant John Darcy.

== Filmography ==
=== Film ===
Key
†	Denotes films that have not yet been released.

Year	Title	Role	Notes
2001	Lost and Delirious	Jake Hollander	
2002	Halloween: Resurrection	Jim	
2003	Mambo Italiano	Angelo Barberini	
2003	Shattered Glass	Rob Gruen	
2003	Luck	Shane Bradley	
2004	Window Theory	Brad	
2004	The Human Kazoo	Zacharia	Short film
2005	The Greatest Game Ever Played	Frank Hoyt	
2007	All Hat	Ray Dokes	
2007	The Stone Angel	Leo	
2009	Labor Pains	Nick Steinwald	
2011	Take This Waltz	Daniel	
2012	The Samaritan	Ethan	
2013	The Boston Post	Sam	Short film
2013	Empire of Dirt	Russell	
2014	True Man	Client	Short film
2015	Touched with Fire	Marco	
2015	Sure Thing	Bill	Short film
2017	A Dog's Purpose	Jim Montgomery	
2017	Another Kind of Wedding	Misha	
2018	Little Woods	Bill	
2019	Glass	Pierce	
2020	Percy	Peter Schmeiser	
2021	No Man of God	Ted Bundy	
2022	The Independent	Lucas Nicoll	
2023	Boston Strangler	F. Lee Bailey	
2023	Dark Harvest	Officer Jerry Ricks	
2024	Out of My Mind	Chuck	
2024	Turn Me On	Founder	
2025	Terror Keeps You Slender	The Photographer	Short film
TBA	Close to Nowhere †	TBA	

=== Television ===
Key
†	Denotes television programs that have not yet aired.

Year	Title	Role	Notes
2000	Give Me Your Soul...	Narrator	Television documentary
2001	Haven	Daniel Weinzweig	Television film
2003–2005	Slings & Arrows	Jack Crew	Main role (season 1), guest role (season 2)
2004	Sex Traffic	Callum Tate	Television miniseries
2005	Bury the Lead	Josh Casey	Episode: "Hit Delete"
2005	It's Me...Gerald	Dr. Dan	Episode: "How Do You Know You've Hit Bottom?"
2006	Northern Town	Brian	Main role
2007	Tell Me You Love Me	Hugo	8 episodes
2009	Flashpoint	Evan Hewson	Episode: "Last Dance"
2009	Law & Order	Bobby Amato	Episode: "The Drowned and the Saved"
2009	Law & Order: Criminal Intent	Andre Haslum	Episode: "Folie a Deux"
2009–2010	Cra$h & Burn	Jimmy Burn	Main role
2012–2014	Republic of Doyle	Clyde Cowley	2 episodes
2012	Elementary	Aaron Ward	Episode: "The Rat Race"
2012	Law & Order: Special Victims Unit	Braden Leddy	Episode: "Vanity's Bonfire"
2013	Person of Interest	Chris Beckner	Episode: "2 Pi R"
2013	Blue Bloods	Detective Wolf Landsman	Episode: "Men in Black"
2013–2016	Rectify	Jon Stern	Main role
2015	The Astronaut Wives Club	Max Kaplan	Main role
2015	Show Me a Hero	Edwin E. McAmis	Episode: "Episode 2"
2015	The Good Wife	Harry McGrath	Episode: "Cooked"
2017–2023	The Marvelous Mrs. Maisel	Lenny Bruce	Main role (season 4), recurring role (seasons 1–3, and 5)
2017	The Good Fight	Harry McGrath	Episode: "Self Condemned"
2017	Bull	Harry Kemp	Episode: "Dirty Little Secrets"
2018	Blindspot	Christophe Bruyere / Junior	2 episodes
2018–2019	The Deuce	Gene Goldman	Main role (seasons 2–3)
2018	Sorry for Your Loss	Tripp	Episode: "Welcome to Palm Springs"
2018	Law & Order: Special Victims Unit	Andrew Leibowitz	Episode: "Hell's Kitchen"
2019	The Twilight Zone	Dylan	Episode: "Not All Men"
2019	Tales of the City	Tommy Nelson	2 episodes
2020	Little Voice	Jeremy	4 episodes
2021–2022	Gossip Girl	Davis Calloway	11 episodes
2022	Panhandle	Bell Prescott	Main role; also producer
2023	The Company You Keep	Jones Malone	Episode: "Against All Odds"
2023	Dr. Death	Dr. Nathan Gamelli	Main role (season 2)
2025	Étoile	Jack McMillan	Main role
2026	The Last Thing He Told Me	Teddy Campano	8 episodes
2026	Law & Order Toronto: Criminal Intent	Detective Sergeant John Darcy	Main role (season 4)

=== Podcasts ===
Year	Title	Role	Notes
2022	Marvel's Wastelanders: Doom	Maximus	Episode: "Chapter One: A Super Hero Walks into a Bar"
2023	Supreme: The Battle for Roe	Roy Lucas	4 episodes
2023	The Downloaded	Dr. Jurgen Haas	10 episodes

== Theatre credits ==
Year	Play	Role	Notes
2001	Geometry in Venice	Morgan	Factory Theatre
2001	Troilus and Cressida	Patroclus / Deiphobus	American Place Theatre
2001	Habitat	Sparkle	Bluma Appel Theatre
2002	The Good Life	Gord	Tarragon Theatre Mainspace
2006	Jump/Cut	Dave	Julia Miles Theater
2007	Defender of the Faith	Thomas	Irish Repertory Theatre
2013–2014	Too Much, Too Much, Too Many	Pastor Hidge	Black Box Theatre
2019–2020	Judgement Day	Thomas Hudetz	Wade Thompson Drill Hall

== Awards and nominations ==
Year	Award	Category	Work	Result	Ref.
2001	Dora Mavor Moore Awards	Outstanding Performance by a Male in a Principal Role - Play	Geometry in Venice	Nominated	
2004	Canadian Comedy Awards	Best Performance by a Male – Film	Mambo Italiano	Nominated	
2005	Gemini Awards	Best Performance by an Actor in a Featured Supporting Role in a Dramatic Program or Mini-Series	Sex Traffic	Nominated	
2005	Gemini Awards	Best Performance by an Actor in a Guest Role Dramatic Series	The Eleventh Hour	Nominated	
2010	Gemini Awards	Best Performance by an Actor in a Continuing Leading Dramatic Role	Cra$h & Burn	Nominated	
2013	ACTRA Awards	Outstanding Performance – Male	The Samaritan	Nominated	
2019	Primetime Emmy Awards	Outstanding Guest Actor in a Comedy Series	The Marvelous Mrs. Maisel	Won	
2020	Primetime Emmy Awards	Outstanding Guest Actor in a Comedy Series	The Marvelous Mrs. Maisel	Nominated	
2022	Chlotrudis Awards	Best Actor	No Man of God	Nominated	
2024	Primetime Emmy Awards	Outstanding Guest Actor in a Comedy Series	The Marvelous Mrs. Maisel	Nominated	
2024	Astra Awards	Best Guest Actor in a Comedy Series	The Marvelous Mrs. Maisel	Nominated	
