= Christopher Donaldson =

Canadian film and television editor

Christopher Donaldson is a Canadian film and television editor. He is most noted for his work on the films Crimes of the Future, for which he received a Canadian Screen Award nomination for Best Editing at the 11th Canadian Screen Awards in 2023, and The Shrouds, for which he was nominated in the same category at the 13th Canadian Screen Awards in 2025.

He has previously been nominated for Best Picture Editing in a Dramatic Program or Series numerous times for his work in television, winning at the 23rd Gemini Awards in 2008 for his work on The Border, and receiving nods at the 19th Gemini Awards in 2004 and the 22nd Gemini Awards in 2007 for Slings & Arrows, the 26th Gemini Awards in 2011 and the 2nd Canadian Screen Awards in 2014 for Flashpoint, and at the 5th Canadian Screen Awards in 2017 for Vikings.

== Filmography ==
=== Film ===
- 2000 - Vinyl
- 2000 - The Uncles
- 2000 - A Word from the Management
- 2000 - Dream Machine
- 2001 - Century Hotel
- 2001 - Khaled
- 2002 - Getting In
- 2002 - McLuhan's Wake
- 2003 - An Idea of Canada
- 2003 - Luck
- 2004 - I, Curmudgeon
- 2005 - Cricket and the Meaning of Life
- 2006 - Not Pretty, Really
- 2007 - Loveable
- 2007 - Four Wings and a Prayer
- 2007 - Global Metal
- 2008 - How Are You?
- 2009 - Waterlife
- 2010 - Act of Dishonour
- 2011 - Take This Waltz
- 2013 - Cottage Country
- 2013 - The Right Kind of Wrong
- 2014 - Stage Fright
- 2015 - Remember
- 2020 - A Simple Fucking Gesture
- 2022 - Crimes of the Future
- 2022 - Women Talking
- 2024 - The Shrouds
- 2025 - Fear Street: Prom Queen

=== Television ===
- 2001 - The Team
- 2001 - The Lanza Sessions
- 2003-05 - Slings & Arrows (18 episodes)
- 2005 - A Perfect Fake
- 2006 - The Art of Seduction (one episode)
- 2007 - Rent-a-Goalie (four episodes)
- 2008 - The Border (nine episodes)
- 2009 - Being Erica (one episode)
- 2009 - The Incredible Journey of the Butterflies
- 2010 - The Kids in the Hall: Death Comes to Town (eight episodes)
- 2010 - The Bridge (four episodes)
- 2010 - Little Films About Big Moments
- 2010-12 - Flashpoint (15 episodes)
- 2011 - Metal Evolution (one episode)
- 2013 - Played (five episodes)
- 2014-16 - Penny Dreadful (six episodes)
- 2016 - Vikings (three episodes)
- 2017 - The Kennedys: After Camelot
- 2017-21 - The Handmaid's Tale (18 episodes)
- 2018 - A Veteran's Christmas
- 2018-20 - Condor (six episodes)
- 2019-21 - American Gods (five episodes)
- 2022 - Reacher (one episode)
- 2023 - Fellow Travelers (three episodes)
