= Alex Nussbaum =

Alex Nussbaum is a Canadian comedian, actor, character designer, and writer.

He has been nominated for a Canadian Comedy Award for Best Male Standup.

He has appeared on Just for Laughs, Comedy Now!, and is a regular judge on the MuchMusic show Video on Trial.

He has acted in the short-lived Cartoon Network show Pink Panther and Pals playing the show's antagonist, Big Nose, as well as many guest characters.

== Filmography ==
- 2003: Comedy Inc. (TV)
- 2003: The Seán Cullen Show (TV)
- 2003: This Time Around (TV)
- 2003: The Toronto Show (TV): Featured
- 2004: The 5th Annual Canadian Comedy Awards (TV): Nominee (Male Stand-up)
- 2006: Monster Warriors (TV): Robber
- 2006: It's a Boy Girl Thing
- 2010: Pink Panther and Pals (TV): Big Nose (voice)
- 2011: The Pink Panther: A Very Pink Christmas (TV): Big Nose (voice)
- 2015: Odd Squad: Man with Potato Chip Bag
