= Another Kind of Wedding =

- Poster
- Directed by: Pat Kiely
- Written by: Pat Kiely
- Produced by: Pat Kiely; Arnie Zipursky; Robert Vroom; Philip Svoboda
- Starring: Kathleen Turner; Kevin Zegers; Jessica Paré; Jacob Tierney; Jessica Parker Kennedy; Luke Kirby; Wallace Shawn; Frances Fisher
- Production companies: CCI Entertainment; Banner Films; Vroom Productions; Alley Lime Productions
- Release date: December 2017 (Whistler Film Festival)
- Running time: 86 minutes
- Country: Canada
- Language: English

Another Kind of Wedding (also titled Someone Else’s Wedding) is a 2017 Canadian comedy-drama film written and directed by Pat Kiely and starring Kathleen Turner, Kevin Zegers, Jessica Paré, Jacob Tierney, Jessica Parker Kennedy, Luke Kirby, Wallace Shawn and Frances Fisher.

== Cast ==
- Kevin Zegers as Kurt
- Jessica Paré as Carrie
- Kathleen Turner as Barbara
- Jessica Parker Kennedy as Louisa
- Wallace Shawn as Albert
- Frances Fisher as Tammy
- Luke Kirby as Misha
- Jacob Tierney as Matthew

== Production ==
Filming began in Montreal in December 2016.

== Release ==
The film was released in theaters and on demand on May 11, 2018.

== Reception ==
The film has a 60% rating on Rotten Tomatoes based on five reviews.

Noel Murray of the Los Angeles Times gave the film a positive review and wrote, "At its best, Another Kind of Wedding understands how hard it can be for families to look past their own burdensome self-mythology, to see each other again as just people."

Tiffany Tchobanian of Film Threat awarded the film two and a half stars out of five.
