= The Drowned and the Saved (Law & Order) =

22nd episode of the 19th season of Law & Order

- Law & Order episode
- Episode no.: Season 19; Episode 22
- Directed by: Fred Berner
- Written by: Dick Wolf (creator); René Balcer (developer); Richard Sweren & Gina Gionfriddo (story)
- Production code: 1. 19022
- Original air date: June 3, 2009

Guest appearances
- Tom Bloom as Charles Whitley; Jodie Markell as Lorraine Flockhart; Tanya Fischer as Vera Laslen; Luke Kirby as Bobby Amato; Susan Kelechi Watson as Thea Curry; Tom Everett Scott as Governor Donald Shalvoy; Alison Elliott as Rita Shalvoy; Mia Dillon as Rowena Whitley

Episode chronology
← Previous "Skate or Die"	Next → "Memo From The Dark Side"

"The Drowned and the Saved" is the 22nd and final episode in the nineteenth season of the long-running American legal drama television series Law & Order, and the 433rd episode of the show overall. According to Nielsen ratings, the episode was watched by 7.99 million viewers in its original American broadcast, on May 3, 2009, on NBC.

== Development ==
Inspired by the corruption charges against Illinois Governor Rod Blagojevich, the episode concludes the storyline begun in "Excalibur."

== Plot ==
The murder of a prominent charity executive leads Detectives Lupo and Bernard down a twisted path of political intrigue. The detectives discover a connection between the murdered executive's secretary, her ex-boyfriend and a top politician's wife. The investigation takes a turn when claims of stalking and blackmail surface, revealing a secret desire for a newly vacated seat in the US Senate. The outcome results in interim (appointed) Manhattan District Attorney Jack McCoy winning election to that office.

== Reception ==
David Hinckley writes that the "subtly titled 'The Drowned and the Saved,' feels at times self-indulgent. The drama itself, by 'L&O' standards, gets a little heavy-handed and clunky."
