= Jonathan Crombie =

Canadian actor and voice actor

- Crombie in 1986
- Born: 12 October 1966; Toronto, Ontario, Canada
- Died: 15 April 2015 (aged 48); New York City, United States
- Years active: 1982–2015
- Parent(s): David Crombie and Shirley Crombie

Jonathan Crombie (12 October 1966 – 15 April 2015) was a Canadian actor and voice-over artist, best known for playing Gilbert Blythe in CBC Television's 1985 telefilm Anne of Green Gables and its two sequels.

== Early life ==
Crombie was born on 12 October 1966, in Toronto, Ontario, the son of David Crombie, who was the mayor of Toronto from 1972 to 1978 and a Canadian federal Cabinet Minister in the 1980s. Crombie attended Lawrence Park Collegiate Institute, where he was spotted by casting agent Diane Polley (mother of Sarah Polley) performing in a production of The Wizard of Oz.

== Career ==
=== Television ===
Crombie had no previous acting experience and used a photo he took at a kiosk in Union Station when he auditioned for the role of Gilbert Blythe in the 1985 TV miniseries Anne of Green Gables. He reprised the role in the 1987 TV movie Anne of Avonlea, the 2000 TV movie Anne of Green Gables: The Continuing Story and an episode of Road to Avonlea in 1992. His role was so popular that he answered to the nickname "Gil".

Crombie was also a comedian and in 1998 performed on the Canadian TV series Comedy Now! as part of the sketch comedy group, Skippy's Rangers. His other television credits included a guest appearance on an episode of the Vancouver-filmed TV series 21 Jump Street in 1991, voicing the title character in the animated series The Secret World of Benjamin Bear (2003–2009), along with its 4 prequel films, and appearing in the second season of Slings & Arrows (2005), as playwright Lionel Train. In 2015, he had guest roles on The Good Wife and Haven.

In 2014, Crombie and John Mitchell wrote, produced, and directed a documentary titled Waiting for Ishtar about the 1987 film Ishtar. The documentary was financed by an Indiegogo crowdfunding campaign. It premiered at Cinecycle in Toronto on 14 December 2017. It was dedicated to the memory of Jonathan Crombie.

=== Theatre ===
Crombie appeared on stage in The Dishwashers by Morris Panych (Tarragon Theatre, 2005) and The Oxford Roof Climbers Rebellion by Stephen Massicotte (Tarragon Theatre/Great Canadian Stage Company, 2006). He spent four seasons at Ontario's Stratford Shakespeare Festival appearing in A Comedy Of Errors, Hamlet, As You Like It, Taming of the Shrew, and as Romeo in Diana Leblanc's Romeo and Juliet. He was nominated for a Dora Mavor Moore Award for his role in the Canadian Stage Company's 1997 production of Tom Stoppard's play Arcadia.

Crombie debuted on Broadway in the Canadian musical The Drowsy Chaperone as "Man in Chair", from March to April 2007. He returned to the production beginning 21 August, and performed the role during the show's tour through the United States.

In 2013, Crombie performed at Centerstage, Baltimore, in Clybourne Park and Benetha's Place for the Rasin Cycle featured on PBS. His final appearance on stage was playing two roles in the Denver Center for the Performing Arts Theatre Company's 2015 world premiere of Benediction, based on the novel by Kent Haruf.

== Death ==
Crombie's family announced on 18 April 2015, that he had died suddenly three days earlier of a brain hemorrhage in New York City. His organs were donated. News of his death led to "Gilbert Blythe" trending on Twitter as fans shared their condolences.

== Personal life ==
Crombie never married and had no children. At his memorial service in 2015, livetweeted by TVOntario journalist Steve Paikin, and his sister Robin said: "Jonathan was also a gay man who didn't come out until his 40s ... He was a very private person."

== Filmography ==
Year	Title	Role	Notes
1982	Class of 1984	Extra in final auditorium scene	
1985	Anne of Green Gables	Gilbert Blythe	TV movie
1986	The Campbells	Kevin Sims	Episode: "The Face of a Stranger"
1986	A Judgment in Stone (The Housekeeper)	Bobby Coversdale	
1986	Bullies	Matt Morris	
1987	CBS Schoolbreak Special	Barney Roth	Episode: "The Day They Came to Arrest the Book"
1987	Anne of Avonlea	Gilbert Blythe	TV movie
1988	Mount Royal	Rob Valeur	16 episodes
1988	Alfred Hitchcock Presents	Rick Garrison	Episode: "Fogbound"
1989	The Jeweler's Shop	Christopher	
1989	The Teddy Bears' Picnic	Benjamin Bear (voice)	TV movie
1989	The Hitchhiker	Kenny	Episode: "Coach"
1991	21 Jump Street	Bill Howard	Episode: "The Education of Terry Carver"
1992	Road to Avonlea	Gilbert Blythe	Episode: "Old Friends, Old Wounds"
1992	Cafe Romeo	Bennie	
1992	The Teddy Bears' Christmas	Benjamin Bear (voice)	TV movie
1992	The Good Fight	Sam Cragin	TV movie
1993	Matrix	Cumberland	Episode: "Conviction of His Courage"
1993	Class of '96	Sam Clive	Episode: "They Shoot Baskets, Don't They"
1997	Comedy Now!	Various	Episode: "Skippy's Rangers - The Show They Never Gave"
1998	The Waiting Game	Matt	TV movie
1998	SketchCom	Various	
1998	The Teddy Bears' Scare	Benjamin Bear (voice)	TV movie
1999–2000	Power Play	Hudson James	5 episodes
2000	Anne of Green Gables: The Continuing Story	Gilbert Blythe	TV movie
2002	Earth: Final Conflict	Dr. Field	Episode: "Deep Sleep"
2003–2009	The Secret World of Benjamin Bear	Benjamin Bear (voice)	
2003	Slings & Arrows		Episode: "Playing the Swan"
2004	The Jane Show	Dave	Episode: "Pilot"
2005	Slings & Arrows	Lionel Train	3 episodes
2006	Empty Room		Short
2013	Cottage Country	Dan Mushin	
2015	The Good Wife	Inspector Bill Frazier	Episode: "Hail Mary"
2015	Haven	Young Dave	Episode: "Just Passing Through"; (posthumous release; final role)
