= Luck (2003 film) =

2003 Canadian romantic comedy film

- Directed by: Peter Wellington
- Written by: Peter Wellington
- Produced by: Simone Urdl; Jennifer Weiss
- Starring: Luke Kirby; Sarah Polley; Jed Rees
- Cinematography: Luc Montpellier
- Edited by: Christopher Donaldson
- Music by: Melissa Auf der Maur; James Iha
- Production company: Film Farm
- Distributed by: Odeon Films
- Release date: August 29, 2003 (MWFF)
- Running time: 91 minutes
- Country: Canada
- Language: English

Luck is a 2003 Canadian romantic comedy film written and directed by Peter Wellington. Set in 1972 against the backdrop of the Canada-Russia Summit Series hockey competition, the film stars Luke Kirby as Shane, a man who falls into a gambling addiction after being turned down by his love interest Margaret (Sarah Polley), but concocts a plan to bet heavily on the hockey games in the hopes of both paying off his gambling debt and winning Margaret back.

The film's cast also includes Noam Jenkins, Jed Rees, Sergio Di Zio, Peter MacNeill and Fiona Reid.

The film premiered at the 2003 Montreal World Film Festival. It was subsequently screened at the 2004 South by Southwest festival, where it won the award for best narrative competition feature.

Wellington received a Genie Award nomination for Best Original Screenplay at the 24th Genie Awards.
