= Cottage Country (film) =

- Film poster
- Directed by: Peter Wellington
- Written by: Jeremy Boxen
- Produced by: Frank Siracusa
- Starring: Malin Åkerman; Tyler Labine; Dan Petronijevic; Lucy Punch
- Cinematography: Luc Montpellier
- Edited by: Christopher Donaldson
- Music by: Asher Lenz; Stephen Skratt
- Production company: Whizbang Films
- Distributed by: Alliance Films; Phoenicia Pictures; Uncork'd Entertainment; Viva Pictures
- Release date: March 14, 2013 (Kuwait)
- Country: Canada
- Language: English

Cottage Country is a 2013 Canadian comedy horror film directed by Peter Wellington. It stars Malin Åkerman, Tyler Labine, Dan Petronijevic and Lucy Punch. It was released on March 14, 2013. The film was produced by Whizbang Films and Red Rock Entertainment.

== Plot ==
Todd (Labine) wants everything to be perfect at his family cottage, where he plans to propose to Cammie (Åkerman). However, things go wrong when Todd's slacker brother, Salinger (Petronijevic), and his free-spirited girlfriend, Masha (Punch), show up. Todd accidentally kills his brother with an axe. After he confesses to Cammie, they devise a plan to kill Masha.

While she is in the kitchen cooking mushrooms, Masha turns around and catches Todd, who is about to strike. Cammie quickly hits her with the frying pan and knocks her out. While lying on the floor, Masha begins to have a seizure. Cammie covers her face with the tarp and slams her head repeatedly against the floor. Todd and Cammie chop up the bodies and dispose of them in the lake on their way to the island. There, Todd proposes, and Cammie says yes.

On their way back to the mainland, they discover that Salinger invited many people to the cottage for a party and that they have arrived. During the party, one of Salinger's friends becomes very concerned about the disappearance of Masha and Salinger and catches Cammie in a lie. The friend then talks to Todd, who is very nervous, and tells him how much Salinger respects and loves him. He notices the cut above Todd's head and starts asking him about it.

Todd's timeline fails to match up, but Cammie is determined not to let the murder stand in the way of their happiness. Todd, overwhelmed with guilt for killing his brother and his indirect participation in Masha's death confesses to Cambie that he will turn himself in. Cammie, who has become obsessed with making sure that she and Tom marry, frames another for Salinger and Masha's death.

Todd, horrified at the extremes Cammie will go to preserve their future life together, attempts to end their relationship and drive to the police station and confess his crimes. Cammie drives after him to change his mind. After a reckless race to the police station, Todd arrives first and gets out of his car and begins to confess to the two officers outside currently on a smoke break. Cammie, seeing this as an unforgivable act of betrayal, attempts to ram Todd with her car.

This results in the female officer shooting her through the windshield, barely missing Todd, who closed his eyes and spread his arms, resigning himself to his fate, however, as a result of several bullet wounds to her chest, Cammie swerves and crushes the female officer. Todd, dumbstruck, watches Cammie crawl out of the car, still claiming they can make this work, Todd rebuffs her one final time and says that he is breaking up with her. Cammie, dying and distraught, retrieves the dying officer's gun from the hood of the car and shoots Todd in the head. Before she dies, Cammie removes the engagement ring with her teeth and slumps to the ground.

The film skips forward a year, and Todd, having survived the gunshot wound, is wheeled on to the dock by his father. Todd, in his wheelchair, comments how nice the cottage is, before inquiring about his mother and brother. The camera pans to show surgical scars on Todd's head, indicating that he is suffering severe memory loss and brain damage as he repeats the same question to his father, despite his father answering those questions moments ago.

== Cast ==
- Malin Åkerman as Cammie Ryan
- Tyler Labine as Todd Chipowski
- Dan Petronijevic as Salinger Chipowski
- Lucy Punch as Masha
- Jim Annan as Constable Grant
- Benjamin Ayres as Dov Rosenberg
- Jonathan Crombie as Dan Mushin
- Sabrina Grdevich as Officer Mackenzie
- Jason C. Paul as Hipster 1
