= Law & Order season 19 =

Season of American television series

Law & Order
- Season 19
- Season 19 U.S. DVD cover
- Starring: Jeremy Sisto; Anthony Anderson; S. Epatha Merkerson; Linus Roache; Alana de la Garza; Sam Waterston
- No. of episodes: 22

Release
- Original network: NBC
- Original release: November 5, 2008 – June 3, 2009

Season chronology
- ← Previous; Season 18 Next → Season 20

The nineteenth season of Law & Order premiered on NBC on November 5, 2008, and concluded on June 3, 2009. This was the show's third season in which there were no changes in the cast from the previous season, and it would be the last season to air on Wednesday nights at 10PM/9c, Law & Order: Special Victims Unit has claimed the slot off-and-on (SVU often placed at 9PM/8c to lead other programming that later gets moved or taken off schedule) from the fall of 2009 to present.

The series declined in the ratings due to competition from CBS's CSI: NY, although some episodes spiked when CSI: NY episodes were repeats (or replaced with other programming).

== Cast ==
=== Main ===
- Jeremy Sisto as Senior Detective Cyrus Lupo
- Anthony Anderson as Junior Detective Kevin Bernard
- S. Epatha Merkerson as Lieutenant Anita Van Buren
- Linus Roache as Executive Assistant District Attorney Michael Cutter
- Alana de la Garza as Assistant District Attorney Connie Rubirosa
- Sam Waterston as Interim District Attorney Jack McCoy

=== Recurring ===
- Leslie Hendrix as M.E. Dr. Elizabeth Rodgers

=== Guest ===
- Carolyn McCormick as Dr. Elizabeth Olivet

== Episodes ==
No. overall	No. in season	Title	Directed by	Written by	Original release date	Prod. code	U.S. viewers (millions)
412	1	"Rumble"	Constantine Makris	Richard Sweren & Christopher Ambrose	November 5, 2008	19003	7.94
Stockbroker Todd Hauser is beaten to death and the investigation leads to an illegal street-fighting ring. Issues around misuse of terrorism statutes are explored.
413	2	"Challenged"	Fred Berner	René Balcer & Ed Zuckerman	November 12, 2008	19001	7.93
The detectives hope that a mentally challenged patient can help them solve the case of a man found murdered in a park, but the patient's family may be responsible for the crime.
414	3	"Lost Boys"	Christopher Zalla	Richard Sweren & Gina Gionfriddo	November 19, 2008	19004	7.62
A young man's murder is linked to a woman who has escaped from a polygamous religious cult.
415	4	"Falling"	Michael Watkins	Stephanie Sengupta & Keith Eisner	November 26, 2008	19005	6.33
A crane falls and kills a man and the detectives find evidence of foul play.
416	5	"Knock Off"	Constantine Makris	S : Jonathan Rintels; T : William N. Fordes & Matthew McGough	December 3, 2008	19006	11.31
A tourist is murdered and the detectives suspect that corrupt law enforcement officers from a small town are involved. Meanwhile, the governor threatens to nominate a new District Attorney for the upcoming election. Note: Partially inspired by a New York Times report on untrained judges and abuses of justice in Upstate New York
417	6	"Sweetie"	Mario Van Peebles	Ed Zuckerman & Luke Schelhaas	December 10, 2008	19007	7.51
A well-known memoir writer, who wrote a book about his early life as male prostitute Dale Marx, is found dead, but as the detectives investigate they discover that the book was based on the life of another person.
418	7	"Zero"	Marisol Torres	Ed Zuckerman & Luke Schelhaas	December 17, 2008	19002	7.02
A woman's body is found in a city garden, leaving Bernard and Lupo to sort through her contradictory life and her ties to a cop's death in New Jersey. Then Cutter's case is jeopardized by a law clerk with a crush whose judge requires an unusual amount of assistance.
419	8	"Chattel"	Jim McKay	William N. Fordes & Matthew McGough	January 7, 2009	19009	10.26
A pair of divorce lawyers are murdered in their home and the investigation leads to a possible cover-up involving the abuse of adopted Haitian children.
420	9	"By Perjury"	Darnell Martin	Richard Sweren & Christopher Ambrose	January 14, 2009	19010	8.26
A plaintiff in a class-action suit against an airline is murdered and the murder may have been committed by a lawyer linked to many other murders in the past.
421	10	"Pledge"	Alex Chapple	Richard Sweren & Gina Gionfriddo	January 21, 2009	19008	8.27
Harold Foley and his wife Joyce, both biologists at a local university, come home to find their son Eric Foley and their housekeeper Grazinya murdered. The case leads to a man obsessed with a certain sorority. Guest starring: Timothée Chalamet as Eric Foley
422	11	"Lucky Stiff"	Marc Levin	Ed Zuckerman & Matthew McGough	January 28, 2009	19012	8.96
A murdered truck driver has ties to the Russian mob.
423	12	"Illegitimate"	Josh Marston	Stephanie Sengupta & Keith Eisner	February 4, 2009	19011	8.64
A police officer, who has been having financial problems, takes hostages at gunpoint and is then killed by fellow officers. He has the keys to an apartment that is not his primary residence; detectives Lupo and Bernard search the apartment and find a dead body and valuable documents that have been stolen by a man who believes they will prove that he is the illegitimate son of John F. Kennedy.
424	13	"Crimebusters"	Alex Chapple	Richard Sweren & Gina Gionfriddo	February 11, 2009	19013	7.44
After an Army recruitment center is bombed an unconscious woman and her dead baby who were sleeping at the place are found in the wreckage. The case gets even more complicated after a group of voluntary vigilantes interfere in the investigation and both of the prime suspects, including the baby's own mother, have equal motives for the crime.
425	14	"Rapture"	Fred Berner	Ed Zuckerman & Luke Schelhaas	February 18, 2009	19014	7.23
The creator of a religious website is murdered and the trail leads to a corrupt charitable organization that was stealing from his clients. When the detectives are ready to arrest a suspect, he seeks asylum in the Embassy of Iran claiming to be victim of a Zionist conspiracy.
426	15	"Bailout"	Jean de Segonzac	Richard Sweren & Christopher Ambrose	March 11, 2009	19015	7.64
The mistress of the CEO of a failed bank is killed in a hit-and-run and the investigation leads to a kidnapping and extortion plot.
427	16	"Take-Out"	Jim McKay	William N. Fordes & Keith Eisner	March 18, 2009	19016	7.14
A writer is murdered after investigating an espionage case involving the Chinese government that led to the imprisonment of a man many years ago.
428	17	"Anchors Away"	Alex Chapple	Ed Zuckerman & Matthew McGough	March 25, 2009	19017	7.33
Detectives Lupo and Bernard investigate the murder of a television reporter who was involved in a love triangle with one of her co-workers. Note: Partially inspired by a combination of the murder of Anne Pressly, the Madoff investment scandal, and the Larry Mendte scandal. Dawn, the name of the murder victim, is also the name of Mendte's wife.
429	18	"Promote This!"	Michael Watkins	Richard Sweren & Christopher Ambrose	April 29, 2009	19019	7.83
The detectives investigate the vicious beating of an Hispanic illegal immigrant who may be linked to a series of other hate crimes.
430	19	"All New"	Roger Young	William N. Fordes & Keith Eisner	May 6, 2009	19020	8.14
Firefighter Thomas Cooper and his wife Linda are tortured and murdered in their new townhouse. The murders are thought to be linked to an old unsolved drug case, but then the detectives learn about a firefighter named Nick Spence, who had just joined Cooper's company and was being severely hazed. The investigation suffers a setback when Spence dies in a fire under suspicious circumstances.
431	20	"Exchange"	Ernest Dickerson	Stephanie Sengupta	May 13, 2009	19018	7.90
Two engaged scientists die in a fire and their mentally challenged neighbor is injured while trying to help them. The detectives discover that the couple was stabbed before the fire, which leads them to a disturbed and extremely jealous woman.
432	21	"Skate or Die"	Norberto Barba	Ed Zuckerman & Luke Schelhaas	May 20, 2009	19021	6.67
Detectives Lupo and Bernard investigate a serial killer who targets homeless men and discover that a copycat may be at work, but to arrest the murderers they need the testimony of a bipolar skater who is having a psychotic attack.
433	22	"The Drowned and the Saved"	Fred Berner	Richard Sweren & Gina Gionfriddo	June 3, 2009	19022	8.87
A prominent charity executive is murdered and claims of stalking and blackmail surface during the investigation. The case then leads to Rita Shalvoy, the wife of governor Donald Shalvoy, and once again Jack McCoy must know if he is willing to prosecute his old friend.
