= Lara Rae =

Canadian comedian and instructor

- Born: Al Rae; 1963 (age 62–63); Glasgow, Scotland
- Occupations: Comedian, television and radio writer
- Writing career
- Period: 1980s-present
- Notable works: Little Mosque on the Prairie, The Debaters

Lara Rae (born 1963 in Glasgow, Scotland), formerly known as Al Rae, is a Canadian comedian, best known as the longtime artistic director of the Winnipeg Comedy Festival and as a frequent guest on the CBC Radio One comedy series The Debaters.

She has also been a writer for radio and television, including on Blackfly, Big Sound, Little Mosque on the Prairie, What a Week, Definitely Not the Opera and Monsoon House. She has been a three-time Canadian Comedy Award nominee and a Gemini Award nominee for her work on Little Mosque.

Rae started as half of the Toronto-based comedy duo Al & George with George Westerholm. After the duo broke up in 1993, Rae moved to Winnipeg and began working as a solo standup comedian. She wrote the play How Do You Know When You're Done?, a fictionalized account of their creative tensions and breakup which premiered at the Tim Sims Playhouse in 1999, and was a founder of the Winnipeg Comedy Festival in 2002.

In 2013, while still known as Al and presenting as male, Rae came out as gay at age 49. She came out as transgender in October 2015. At the time of her announcement, she was working as an assistant director on a stage production of Christopher Marlowe's play Edward II in Winnipeg. In November, she made her first on-stage appearance as a comedian since beginning her gender transition, as part of the Empow(HER)ment comedy show in Winnipeg.

She is an instructor in the Department of Women’s and Gender Studies at the University of Winnipeg.
