= Pink Panther and Pals =

American animated television series

- Genre: Comedy; Slapstick
- Based on: the Pink Panther characters by: David DePatie; Friz Freleng; The Pink Panther by Blake Edwards
- Developed by: David J. Corbett; Isam S. Ayoubi
- Voices of: Kel Mitchell; Eddie Garvar; Alex Nussbaum; Jeannie Elias
- Theme music composer: Henry Mancini (arranged by David Ricard)
- Composer: David Ricard
- Country of origin: United States
- Original language: English
- No. of seasons: 1
- No. of episodes: 26 (78 segments)

Production
- Executive producers: David J. Corbett; Isam S. Ayoubi; Walter Mirisch
- Producer: Randa Ayoubi
- Animator: Rubicon Studios
- Running time: 22 minutes (7 minutes per segment)
- Production companies: Desert Panther Productions; Mirish-Geoffrey-DePatie-Freleng; MGM Television

Original release
- Network: Cartoon Network
- Release: March 7 – July 4, 2010
- Network: Boomerang
- Release: August 12 – August 23, 2010

Related
- The Pink Panther

Pink Panther and Pals is an American animated television series and a modern adaptation of the classic DePatie-Freleng Pink Panther shorts from the 1960s. The series was produced by Desert Panther Productions in association with Mirisch-Geoffrey-DePatie-Freleng and MGM Television. It premiered on Cartoon Network on March 7, 2010 and later moved to Boomerang on August 12, 2010. 26 episodes were produced.

Like the classic cartoon show, the program is composed of two seven-minute Pink Panther shorts and a seven-minute Ant and the Aardvark short in between, retaining the main characters in both shorts though with some changes.

== Show premise ==
=== The Pink Panther ===
The Pink Panther shorts are reminiscent of the classic DePatie-Freleng shorts from the 1960s and the 1970s, from art direction, silent acting, musical scoring, and story lines. The Pink Panther remains silent throughout the show and appears as a teenager. The Little Man was renamed "Big Nose" for this series, being voiced by Alex Nussbaum. Pink Panther's horse and Big Nose's canine companion were reintroduced as well.

=== The Ant and the Aardvark ===
The Ant and the Aardvark is based on the classic DePatie-Freleng shorts. In this version, the Aardvark's Jewish sense of humor and Jackie Mason-esque voice (portrayed by Eddie Garvar and occasionally John Over) from his classic counterpart remains, a new, younger Ant (voiced by Kel Mitchell) has replaced the Dean Martin-esque "Charlie" from the original shorts. The series now takes place in a jungle and new characters were introduced in the series.

== Characters ==
- The Pink Panther: The eponymous protagonist of the series. Akin to his portrayal in preceding entries in the franchise, Pink is silent, though his actions speak louder than words. Calm, cool and collected, Pink remains level-headed even in the face of adversity, allowing him to triumph over hardships with nothing but his luck and wits on his side. He is also a genial, easygoing fellow who enjoys helping others with their problems whenever he can, though he can be mildly cocky and mischievous at times.
- Big Nose: Based on the original "Little Man" from the classic series, Big Nose is the Panther's primary rival. He is depicted as short, with a big nose, mustache and is plain white in color. He loves the color blue as much as the Panther loves his favorite color, pink. He is often rude, immature, arrogant, unlucky and likes to ruin the Panther's day. He owns an unnamed pet dog who, unlike his master, has next-to-no problem with the Pink Panther and actually seems to enjoy his company. He speaks gibberish. He is the main antagonist of the "Pink Panther" segments.
- Horse: Pink Panther's white horse, based on a horse that gave him trouble in several cartoons of the classic series.
- Dog: Big Nose's Bull Terrier, often serving as a source of comic-relief in the shorts. He too is of a plain white complexion. Compared to his owner, he is shown to enjoy the Pink Panther's activities, such as music and dancing, though isn't always fond of him.
- Ant: A red ant and one of the title characters of "The Ant and the Aardvark" segments. He is quite sharp and intelligent and, like real-life ants, is physically strong, being able to carry objects many times his weight. His remarks towards and about Aardvark are somewhat more sharp and sarcastic than in his previous laid-back incarnations.
- The Blue Aardvark: A blue aardvark, serving as one of the title characters and main antagonist of "The Ant and the Aardvark" segments. Like real aardvarks, he spends his time trying to catch and eat the Ant. He's sly, cunning and intelligent, but incredibly inept, never succeeding in his goals (even those that don't have to do with the Ant) long-term. He also uses the fourth wall, frequently addressing the audience as to his goals and/or what's going on.

== Voice cast ==
- Kel Mitchell as Ant
- Eddie Garvar as Aardvark
- Alex Nussbaum as Big Nose, Horse, Dog, Narrator, Big Nose's wife, Dog Tracker, Hedgehog, Chef on TV, Bear, Pig, Lion, Croc 1 and 2, Grampy, Italian Chef, Radio VO, Alien, Skunks, Walrus, Mockingbird Mike, Leopard
- Jeannie Elias as Genius, Female Spy
- John Over as Aardvark, Eli
- Bob Spang as Gracie Gorilla, Rowdy Rhino, Mitey Mite

== Episodes ==
Note: The episode numbers are listed as they are on the official YouTube channel, which is presumably the production order.

No.	Title	Directed by	Written by	Original release date
Cartoon Network
17a	"Pink Up the Volume"	Ron Brewer	Adam Beechen	March 7, 2010
When a new day begins, Big Nose wants to spend his day quietly, with peaceful hobbies like assembling his ship in a bottle, stamp collecting, and pottery, but his neighbor Pink Panther makes the task difficult as he plays various music instruments in his garage. Calling the police didn’t work out as they join Pink Panther to form a band. As a last resort, Big Nose takes his dog with him to the furthest, quietest, most isolated cabin that he can find. But even that does not work since his dog enjoys music and manages to get the stuffed animals in the cabin animated enough to join him in a jam session.
17b	"Zeus Juice"	John Over	John Over	March 7, 2010
Aardvark is out of shape and finds himself too worn out to chase Ant. He returns to his cave where Aardvark, with the help of a special juicer, develops various energy drinks to give him the necessary boost to chase Ant in the jungle. However, increased speed, laser vision, powerful nostril suction, and even boosted intelligence are not enough to get the better of the Ant. Aardvark finally catches him the old-fashioned way. However, Ant has a juicer of his own and drinks his own energy drink increase his strength and free himself, after which Aardvark then decides to order pizza next time he's hungry.
17c	"A Pink and Stormy Night"	Ron Brewer	Ken Segall	March 7, 2010
Mad scientist Big Nose has invented a machine that can turn anyone into a monster, and needs a test subject. He calls in a pizza delivery by Pink Panther in hopes of turning him into a monster. However, his efforts backfire and only his dog ends up transforming. Big Nose's last attempt results in making himself gigantic, and he chases his dog and Pink Panther around his castle. However, his even bigger and angrier wife intervenes, forcing the scientist to pay Pink Panther for the pizza, and Pink Panther obliges by delivering a giant-sized pizza to satisfy the woman's appetite. Note: Partial remake of "Pink Panic" (1967) and "Pink Plasma" (1975)
20a	"Pink Hi-Tops"	Ron Brewer	Ken Segall	March 14, 2010
Pink Panther wants the latest pair of high-top sneakers that everyone has. A golden pair that seems to have a life of its own comes along and get on his feet, causing him to zoom all over the world at fast speeds. He makes it back to the city, but has trouble removing the sneakers until he finds himself on a jetliner. The high-tops eventually come off, but when Big Nose is walking his dog, he puts them on and gets carried off the same way. Note: Partial remake of "Tickled Pink" (1968)
20b	"Land of the Gi-Ants"	John Over	John Over; Denise Downer (story)	March 14, 2010
After Aardvark unwittingly gets into a fight with Eli the Elephant, the pachyderm pounds him down into a subterranean prehistoric world where aardvarks are significantly smaller than ants. Modern-day Aardvark tries to train his prehistoric counterpart on how to catch a giant ant, but their efforts are unsuccessful. Aardvark then gets into a fight with a woolly mammoth, who knocks him back home to the jungle, before Eli smashes him back down to the prehistoric world again.
20c	"Pink Thumb"	Ron Brewer	Adam Beechen	March 14, 2010
Pink Panther enjoys his luscious green garden until a factory is built nearby, causing pollution to ruin and kill his plants. Sneaking in, Pink Panther discovers it is an automated factory run by Big Nose, who is utilizing various robots, including a dog to keep intruders out. Pink Panther counters by growing various plants and trees inside to get the better of Big Nose and the robots.
7a	"Pink Magic"	Cecilia Aranovich	Ken Segall	March 21, 2010
When magician Big Nose's stage show proves a flop, Pink Panther takes over, drawing a big crowd and applause and leaving the disgruntled magician to try to get back on stage to win back the crowd. His efforts are unsuccessful and Pink Panther only becomes more of a hit, leaving Big Nose frustrated as the audience carries Pink Panther triumphantly out of the theater.
7b	"Party Animals"	Bob Spang, John Over	Adam Beechen, John Over	March 21, 2010
Learning he can't resist parties, Aardvark invites Ant to his birthday party in hopes of making a meal out of him. But Ant is wise to his plan, inviting several of the other jungle animals to join them in what becomes a real party, impeding Aardvark's efforts.
7c	"Pink n' Putt"	Ron Brewer	Ken Segall	March 21, 2010
Pink Panther is enjoying a round of miniature golf when Big Nose pushes ahead of him, then resorts to cheating in efforts to win. Naturally, Big Nose's efforts continually backfire, especially when his own rocket booby-trap blasts him to the Moon. As a result, Pink Panther is the first winner.
16a	"Pinxillated"	Cecilia Aranovich	Adam Beechen	March 28, 2010
Pink Panther goes to the local arcade run by stingy Big Nose, who does all he can to prevent a young boy from getting a prize (a stuffed animal version of Horse) by continuously increasing the number of tickets needed to win so as to keep the toys all for himself. Pink Panther finds this unfair and plays the various games, most against Big Nose himself in order to accumulate tickets. While playing a video game, the two then are pulled into the various video games, where Pink Panther still comes out on top, leaving Big Nose still trapped inside one of the games. Afterward, Pink Panther donates all of his tickets to the boy and they make off with as many prizes as they can when they leave the arcade. Note: Partial remake of "Pink Arcade" (1978). This episode contains parodies of Tron, Dance Dance Revolution, Street Fighter, Pac-Man, and Donkey Kong.
16b	"Zoo Ruse"	Robert Sledge , John Over	John Over	March 28, 2010
Aardvark is on exhibit at a zoo, where the ants' display is a hit but Aardvark's is a flop. Aardvark escapes his display in effort to get to the ants and eat all of them, but has a difficult time when he winds up going through other animal displays, then outside to the general public. He is able to steal a set of keys from a zoo attendant, but only succeeds in entering, then locking himself back into his own display.
16c	"The Spy Wore Pink"	Ron Brewer	Adam Beechen	March 28, 2010
Pink Panther becomes a reluctant secret agent, and is assigned to retrieve a disc from an office building, while spy Big Nose is out to stop him from delivering it to his contact. In the end, Agent Pink Panther is able to outwit him and make the delivery. The disc turns out to be a rare music CD that enables Pink Panther and the contact to dance to the latest song. Note: Update of the classic Pink Panther cartoon "Pinkfinger".
5a	"Remotely Pink"	Tyree Dillihay	Adam Beechen	April 4, 2010
Pink Panther gets a universal remote control for his entertainment system. However, it only works on various other items, like the vacuum, Big Nose's garage door, the sun and the moon. Other items in the house are changed and Pink Panther even finds himself altering his own cartoon. He eventually gives up trying to use it to operate his entertainment unit. But when he begins washing the dishes, he finds that the faucets can control the TV, so he brings it over to sit down and watch, then using the remote to fill his drinking glass. Note: This episode contains parodies of Click and Star Wars Episode IV: A New Hope.
5b	"I Didn't See That Coming"	John Over	John Over	April 4, 2010
Aardvark tries to catch Ant by using an invisibility spray, but his strategy does not work as well as expected, especially when Ant uses it to get the better of him. Things get worse when Aardvark insults a tiger and his mother, and errs again when he accidentally uses the spray on them, causing the two to wallop him.
5c	"Pink Party of One"	Cecilia Aranovich	Adam Beechen	April 4, 2010
While skateboarding, Pink Panther gets hungry and decides to dine out of a meal at a fancy restaurant, but maître d' Big Nose won't allow him to enter without the proper attire, eventually throwing him out. Instead of following instructions, Pink Panther tries several schemes to sneak in, but is thwarted before going in disguise. Big Nose mistakenly thinks he's a restaurant critic before getting wise to the deception. The real food critic arrives, and the maître d', thinking him Pink Panther, gives him an extra spicy meal. The critic is outraged, leading Big Nose to get fired. Some the next few days, Pink Panther is skateboarding in the park and goes to a hot dog cart when he's hungry, but Big Nose is the vendor and furiously chases him away for losing his job.
4a	"Pink Pool Fool"	Ron Brewer	Ken Segall	April 11, 2010
On the first day, Pink Panther goes to the local skate park only to find it closed for the day. Undeterred, he finds ways to drain the water from the pool he shares with Big Nose in order to use it as a substitute, but a battle ensues as Big Nose wants his pool filled so he can have a cool dip during the hot day.
4b	"The Aardvark's New Moves"	Bob Spang, John Over	Bob Spang, John Over, Bob Spang (story)	April 11, 2010
A sloth offers Aardvark the chance to catch Ant by having him go high-tech in exchange for getting half of the meal. But efforts of using hypnosis, virtual boxing and dimensional portals all backfire, leading Aardvark to give the sloth half of the pummeling he received.
4c	"The Mighty Pinkwood Tree"	Cecilia Aranovich	Ken Segall	April 11, 2010
Pink Panther tries to save the tree where he lives from Big Nose, who is in charge of building a highway. Big Nose's efforts to cut it down are repeatedly thwarted up until a last try seems successful... until the tree drops down on the new highway. But Pink Panther, Big Nose and a beaver work out a compromise as they get termites to dig a tunnel at the base of the tree, where Big Nose can work as a toll booth clerk to earn money for his now-successful highway. Note: Partial remake of "Pink Campaign" (1975)
23a	"Pink Suds & Clean Duds"	Ron Brewer	Adam Beechen	April 18, 2010
Pink Panther has quite an eventful day at the laundromat, especially with Big Nose's family there. Pink Panther has to find a free washing machine, get enough coins from the change machine, then find an available dryer. With Big Nose's kids using carts to race and spilled detergent, it becomes a major adventure. In the end, Big Nose is piling all his clean laundry ready to leave, only to have a passing ice cream truck splash mud all over the entire load, forcing him to stay at the laundromat to start all over again. Note: Partial remake of "Pink Suds" (1979).
23b	"Dog Daze"	Robert Sledge, John Over	John Over	April 18, 2010
Aardvark catches a cold, and while watching TV sees an ad for a professional tracking dog service. He hires one for three hours for the purpose of catching Ant, but the hunt doesn't go as well as expected. After spending his day photographing the wildlife, Ant hires the dog to chase Aardvark.
23c	"The Pink Painter Show"	Tyree Dillihay	Ken Segall	April 18, 2010
At an art gallery, Pink Panther and Big Nose compete to see whose artwork will come out on top when an art critic arrives. Big Nose's efforts to sabotage Pink Panther and bolster his own work continuously backfire up until one last try causes him to be coated in pink paint and make him look like a statue. Strangely enough, he gets the blue ribbon as the best exhibit.
26a	"Cleanliness Is Next to Pinkliness"	Lionel Ordaz	Mark Zaslove	April 25, 2010
At their apartment building, Pink Panther and Big Nose are trying to bathe and shower at the same time, but there is not enough water for both apartments, and the two battle to get their water to the right temperature. They continuously tinker with the building's plumbing, and eventually Big Nose tampers with the reservoir, causing geysers to pop up all over the city streets and leaving Pink Panther with more than enough water to shower.
26b	"Baby Makes Three"	Robert Sledge, John Over	Adam Beechen, John Over	April 25, 2010
Ant agrees to care for Mrs. Gorilla's baby while she's away for the day. Aardvark uses this as an opportunity to sneak up on Ant, but the baby gets the better of him each time. When mother returns, Ant agrees the baby can keep Aardvark as his new pet as he gets a jar of honey in exchange.
26c	"Pinkozoic Era"	Ron Brewer	Guy Toubes	April 25, 2010
A narrator gives a documentary on the development and evolution of Primitive Man and Primitive Pink Panther as they invent the wheel, various modes of transportation, ways of fishing, art, tools and even attempted flight. Primitive Man seems to lose out to Primitive Pink Panther, but eventually, they'll evolve into higher beings... or will they? Note: Partial remake of "Prehistoric Pink" (1968) and "Extinct Pink" (1969).
25a	"Pinkaroni Pizza"	Lionel Ordaz	Ken Segall	May 2, 2010
Pink Panther craves pizza, but is unable to find a parlor nearby. Instead, he buys a special do-it-yourself pizza-making kit with the necessary ingredients to make one himself. Following an audio guide on how to do so leads to messy results. Note: Partial remake of "Pink Blue Plate" (1971) and "Pink Breakfast" (1979). One of the episodes where the Pink Panther loses at the end. Big Nose appears as a cameo in Pinkaroni Pizza.
25b	"Find Your Own Ant"	Bob Spang	Ken Segall, Charles Horn	May 2, 2010
Aardvark finds himself in competition with a hedgehog to catch Ant, who has become even more appetizing after stuffing himself with kiwi fruit. The two eventually wind up in the wrestling ring for a fight. The hedgehog steals a beehive's armor and is nearly victorious up until the bees arrive to get their hive back. Aardvark wins, but when hetries to eat his desired meal, he suffers an allergic reaction to all the kiwi Ant has eaten, enabling Ant to escape once again.
25c	"Gold, Silver, Bronze, Pink"	Tyree Dillihay	Adam Beechen	May 2, 2010
Pink Panther, Big Nose and Horse compete in various Olympic events talent race, with each devising ways to win against the other. Pink Panther is the overall winner with several gold medals, Horse wins one, and Big Nose gets shut out. Pink Panther, feeling sympathetic, offers Big Nose one of his medals, putting a smile on Big Nose's face and promising him that he will play as well next time. But he is unable to wear it since he has no neck on which to hang his medal, and it simply drops to the ground.
11a	"Pink Pink Pink Pink"	Ron Brewer	Adam Beechen	May 9, 2010
Pink Panther gets a fancy new music stereo system which he finds can duplicate any object that gets pulled into it. When he gets pulled in as well, three clones of Pink Panther are created, each of which has a distinct personality, all of whom cause chaos for both the original panther and Big Nose.
11b	"Mitey Blue"	Robert Sledge	John Over, David Corbett, Adam Beechen (story)	May 9, 2010
Ant recalls the time he met Mitey Mite, a strong termite who protected him from Aardvark and loves music. Initially, he wasn't very talented, but Ant found he can play the piano well. And when Aardvark makes a second attack, the termite was able to defeat him again, and in the process found he could be his personal instrument as well. Eventually, Mitey Mite is able to go on a concert tour with Aardvark going along with him. Note: Partial remake of "Rough Brunch" (1971)
11c	"Wild Pinkdom"	Ron Brewer	Ken Segall	May 9, 2010
In this spoof of wildlife programs, Big Nose is a nature photographer seeking to get a picture of the never-before-photographed Pink Panther. A narrator gives details of his efforts to do so. However, his efforts are far from successful, and he's eventually fired from the magazine where he worked. Afterward, he settles for being a photographer for children parties, and he is invited to Pink Panther's party.
13a	"Knights in Pink Armor"	Lionel Ordaz	David Shayne	May 16, 2010
In medieval times, King Big Nose is fed up with his palace. He gives his servant Pink Panther the opportunity to become a knight by sending him out on a mission to slay a dragon that is a threat to his kingdom, doing so only because his servant is expendable. After journeying up to the mountain he resides, Pink Panther tries various ways to defeat the dragon, only to find that he is afraid of mice, giving him the chance to make a deal with him. The dragon returns with Pink Panther, forcing the king to officially make him a knight, while the dragon can provide entertainment as well as heat for the coming winter. Note: Partial remake of "Pink Valiant" (1968).
13b	"Spaced Out"	Robert Sledge	John Over, David Corbett, Adam Beechen (story)	May 16, 2010
When a small alien spaceship is abandoned by its fleet and crash-lands in the jungle, its tiny occupant ends up being chased around by Aardvark, who thinks it is Ant, while Ant takes the ship out for a spin, collecting as much food as he can. Eventually, the alien is able to contact his fleet, rescuing him from being a snack for Aardvark, then offers Ant a ride. Note: This episode contains subliminal back-masked messages, including "Come back with my ship!", "I'm not a 'something' and I'm not going to take it anymore!", and "Yikes!". Partial remake of "Pink U.F.O." (1978)
13c	"Itching to Be Pink"	Lionel Ordaz	Adam Beechen	May 16, 2010
In the day at the local park, Big Nose's dog suddenly has a fleas. When Pink Panther skates by to pet him, one flea manages to jump onto him, causing him to itch all over as he continues skating in the city. He eventually finds the dog, but Big Nose will only help Pink Panther get some flea powder he has bought if he gives the dog a bath. Afterward, the clean dog is flea-less and Big Nose gives Pink Panther the powder. However, during the exchange, the flea jumps onto him, forcing Big Nose to take the powder back. But as it turns out, all it does is make the flea's new home a winter wonderland. Note: Partial remake of "The Pink Flea" (1971).
21a	"Life in the Pink Lane"	Lionel Ordaz	Adam Beechen, Ken Segall, Stephanie Ramirez (story)	May 23, 2010
Pink Panther competes with Big Nose at a bowling alley. In spite of his efforts to sabotage Pink Panther's game, things do not go Big Nose's way. Eventually, Pink Panther bowls a perfect game, but with a little rubber glue trick, Big Nose is able to get a few strikes of his own. He then tries to stop Pink Panther from getting the trophy, but his efforts backfire as he destroys the bowling alley and falls just short of getting his own perfect game.
21b	"Grampy's Visit"	Robert Sledge	John Over, David Corbett	May 23, 2010
Grampy Aardvark visits to help his grandson in his efforts to catch Ant. He arrives with a stomping machine that the two operate, but Ant is able to sabotage it to his advantage. However, the old Aardvark is able to catch him, but he gets upstaged by his father, who then gets upstaged by his father, and even then his father, making for one weird Aardvark family reunion. Present-generation Aardvark is inspired not to quit and continues his quest to catch Ant.
21c	"Shop-Pink Spree"	Ron Brewer	David Shayne	May 23, 2010
A hungry Pink Panther goes to the local supermarket, where he becomes the one-millionth customer and wins a shopping spree. A jealous Big Nose, who just missed out on the prize, keeps trying to sabotage Pink Panther's efforts to get as much food as he can in a certain amount of time. His last attempt succeeds and Pink Panther leaves empty-handed, but at the local pizza joint, Pink Panther becomes the one-millionth customer there as well and wins a huge supply of pizzas, leaving Big Nose hot under the collar. Note: Partial remake of "Supermarket Pink" (1978)
9a	"Pink Beard"	Ron Brewer	Adam Beechen	May 30, 2010
Pirate Big Nose and his First Mate Dog are sailing around in hope of finding treasure. Following Pink Panther to an island, they encounter a mean squid, quicksand, a snake, and island natives who worship Pink Panther, giving him a map that may lead to the treasure. Their chase takes them to a volcano which erupts. In the end, the only treasure the pirates see is a giant balloon in Pink Panther's image, which he uses to depart the island. Note: Partial remake of "Pink in the Drink" (1978)
9b	"One Small Step for Ant"	Robert Sledge	Jim Beck, Charles Horn	May 30, 2010
Another Ant and Aardvark chase leads them to a space center, where Ant uses a rocket ship to go to the Moon to have a vacation away from Aardvark. However, Aardvark's able to hitch a ride to continue his pursuit of Ant on the moon. After some lunar hijinks, Aardvark stumbles onto the dark side, where giant moon monsters chase him to make a meal of him, while Ant blasts off to continue his vacation on Venus.
9c	"Chilled to the Pink"	Lionel Ordaz	Heidi Foss	May 30, 2010
After autumn quickly changes into winter, a snowstorm instantly appears, burying Pink Panther and Big Nose in the snow. Big Nose has difficulty keeping warm, so he decides to steal Pink Panther's portable heater. Big Nose's last scheme, involving mailing Pink Panther all the way to a tropical island where he is nice and warm, eventually succeeds, but unfortunately, Big Nose accidentally sets the heater to Deep Freeze mode, leaving him in a giant block of ice.
24a	"The Pink Is in the Mail"	Lionel Ordaz	Mark Zaslove	June 6, 2010
Mailman Pink Panther's delivery route is disrupted when Big Nose orders his dog to keep all trespassers off his property while he's taking a bath — and that includes mailmen. But Pink Panther is determined that the mail must be delivered! Note:Partial remake of "The Pink Package Plot" (1968) & "Spark Plug Pink" (1979).
24b	"Aard Fu"	Lionel Ordaz	David Corbett	June 6, 2010
After being outwitted by Ant one too many times, Aardvark trains with a pig in the art of kung fu. But the overall results are less than desirable, especially when it turns out that Ant is the Supreme Master.
24c	"Pink's Peak"	Ron Brewer	Ken Segall, David Corbett	June 6, 2010
Pink Panther and Horse are recruited against their will by a TV show to scale Mount Forget About It, the most unconquerable mountain to climb. The narrator offers them tips on how to achieve their goal, most of which don't work out very well.
19a	"And Not a Drop to Pink"	Lionel Ordaz	Adam Beechen, Ken Segall	June 13, 2010
Archaeologist "Indiana" Pink Panther is exploring an ancient pyramid in Egypt guarded by Mummy Big Nose, who is both annoyed at being woken up and wants to add Pink Panther to his collection of animal mummies. After avoiding various traps and a giant guard dog statue brought to life, Pink Panther discovers a fountain of youth which turns the mummy into a baby.
19b	"Ant Arctic"	Robert Sledge	David Corbett, Robert Sledge	June 13, 2010
Ant plans a trip to Antarctica expecting to find more ants there, but he gets an icy reception as he explores the continent looking for fellow ants. Meanwhile, Aardvark has followed him hoping for a frozen treat, only to have an overly friendly walrus as a constant companion, thwarting his efforts to get Ant.
19c	"Pink on the Canvas"	Unknown	Unknown	June 13, 2010
Pink Panther needs a new strap for his guitar, so he takes on a challenge to battle The Crunch in the wrestling ring to win the champion belt. He takes on the moniker "Pinkrageous" and uses various strategies in an effort to defeat The Crunch and for his dog/manager to get the belt.
22a	"Pink or Consequences"	Lionel Ordaz	Ken Segall	June 20, 2010
Pink Panther reluctantly participates in a game show against El Destructo and his dog El Destructo Jr. He lucks out in most of the rigorous events. He must then go through the difficult final event, the Gauntlet, in order to win the grand prize, a lifetime supply of Pickleicious Pickle Power Extreme, his favorite sports drink.
22b	"Z Is for Aardvark"	Cecilia Aranovich	Denise Downer, David Corbett	June 20, 2010
To gain an advantage in catching Ant, Aardvark paints himself with black and white stripes in order to resemble a zebra, but his plan backfires when a baby zebra mistakes him for its mother, interfering with his efforts to make a meal out of Ant. Ant is angry that it is Aardvark masquerading as a zebra, and tells Aardvark that he had better keep Baby Zebra happy or Ant is going to find its real mother. After unsuccessful attempts, Aardvark gives Baby an "aardvark ride", which the baby zebra's real mother appreciates.
22c	"Pink Me Out to the Ball Game"	Ron Brewer	Guy Toubes	June 20, 2010
Pink Panther and Big Nose attend a baseball game in hopes of catching a foul ball as a souvenir. The two battle all around the stadium when one comes their way.
12a	"Make Pink Not War"	Lionel Ordaz	Guy Toubes	June 27, 2010
Pink Panther finds himself between two feuding water balloon-throwing Big Nose neighbors and can get no peace either outside or inside his house, when they break in to continue their battle. Pink Panther eventually finds the cause of their dispute: one neighbor does not have a beard and the other does not have a moustache. Pink Panther's solution: shave them both, and the two eventually make peace as they admire each other's clean faces. Just when Pink Panther thinks it is all right to go outside, he finds his neighbors' sons in a feud of their own as each is envious of the other's hairstyle. Note: Partial remake of "Pink Panzer" (1965).
12b	"Pick a Caardvark"	Cecilia Aranovich	Adam Beechen, David Corbett	June 27, 2010
After watching a magic show on TV, Aardvark tries to outwit Ant with some card tricks in hopes of winning the chance to eat him. However, Ant is able to turn the tables on him by switching cards to get the higher ones, making the Aardvark run the dreaded errand of getting him honey from the Hill of Doom (with the obvious dangers involved). After one final draw, Aardvark loses again and must get the Ant berries from the Tree of Misery, with even more treacherous hazards in his path.
12c	"Pink Stink"	Ron Brewer	John Semper Jr.	June 27, 2010
Pink Panther's day of spring cleaning his house is ruined when a goat with a horrible stench becomes an uninvited guest in his front yard. Since the surrounding houses are deserted and have no grass, the goat helps himself to Pink Panther's lawn. He eventually makes his way inside and Pink Panther's last resort is to call in a pair of skunks to remove the goat. However, they make themselves at home as well, eating stinky cheese, and leaving Pink Panther with no other choice as to join them.
14a	"Pink Trek"	Ron Brewer	Guy Toubes	July 4, 2010
Pink Panther and Big Nose are competing mailmen seeking to get their deliveries to their destinations no matter where they have to go or whatever conditions they have to deal with, getting in each other's way in the process.
14b	"One Too Many Chefs"	Robert Sledge	Kate Barris	July 4, 2010
Ant tries to convince Aardvark that he is not his only means to a meal, convincing him to try out other foods. Eventually, Ant winds up on a TV show as a competing chef along with a crocodile as they try to make the best dish. However, Aardvark schemes to make Chef Ant as his meal during the show, ending in both of them getting humiliated.
14c	"Pink Kahuna"	Ron Brewer	Adam Beechen	July 4, 2010
Pink Panther's plans for fun and relaxation at the beach are constantly disrupted by beach patrol officer Big Nose, who is banning practically every form of leisure. This does not stop him, as Pink Panther gets his fun by outwitting Big Nose and his dog every way he can, until a police officer arrests Big Nose for impersonating a beach patrol officer.
Boomerang
6a	"Enchanted Pinkdom"	Ron Brewer	Ken Segall; David Corbett (narration)	August 12, 2010
Pink Panther stars as Little Pink Panther Riding Hood in a world that blends elements from several fairy tales, including "The Three Little Pigs", "Jack and the Beanstalk", "Goldilocks and the Three Bears", "Humpty Dumpty", "Jack and Jill" and "Hansel and Gretel". Big Nose portrays the Big Bad Wolf, who causes trouble for each of the fairy tale characters, culminating to the end when Little Pink Panther Riding Hood arrives at Granny's house. She is revealed to be a fairy who uses her powers to drive the wolf away, leaving him at the mercy of the other characters, then treats Pink Panther Riding Hood to a big meal. Note: This episode is a retelling of the folktale "Red Riding Hood".
6b	"Eli the Aardvark"	Bob Spang	Denise Downer; Bob Spang (story)	August 12, 2010
Aardvark tries to drop a boulder on Ant to make a meal of him, but it hits Eli the Elephant, who is carrying a cart of blueberries. As a result, he develops amnesia and is colored blue, enabling Aardvark to manipulate him into believing they are brothers. Then he uses him to try to catch Ant, but ultimately fail. Eventually, another boulder drops on Eli, restoring his memory, and he thwarts Aardvark again.
6c	"Stop-Pink for Directions"	Ron Brewer	David Slack	August 12, 2010
On a hot day, Pink Panther takes his scooter with a fancy new GPS unit to the new ice cream parlor. But after melted ice cream is spilled on it, the unit malfunctions and adopts various personalities, causing the scooter to take Pink Panther to various places around town, including a health food store, an auto race track and chasing a cat. Eventually, he manages to get back to the ice cream parlor where he disposes of the GPS unit and ditches the scooter itself, and joyfully sneaks away with his ice cream as traffic cop Big Nose writes a ticket.
1a	"Frosted Pink"	Lionel Ordaz	David Shayne	August 13, 2010
After going inline skating on a hot day, Pink Panther craves a drink and decides to buy a slushy drink at the local supermarket. Store manager Big Nose wants to keep his workplace clean and organized, and does whatever he can to keep Pink Panther from making a mess. However, his efforts, along with his dog and Pink Panther's blundering, cause the entire store to be flooded with slushy drink. Pink Panther offers a quick solution by selling the drink from outside the store, which is now one giant slushy machine.
1b	"AardvARK"	Bob Spang	Kate Barris	August 13, 2010
On a scorching hot summer day in the jungle, Ant and Aardvark each seek a way to keep cool. After reading the story of "Noah's Ark", Aardvark decides to build his own in hopes that various animals will come on board, including ants so he can get a meal as well. To everyone's surprise, it does rain, causing a flood and making them jump on board. However, Aardvark misses the boarding due to the fact that he gets seasick.
1c	"Pink! Pow! Kaboom!"	Lionel Ordaz	Lionel Ordaz, Miguel Puga (story)	August 13, 2010
When Pink Panther does not have enough money to buy a greatly coveted comic book at the local comic book store, store owner Big Nose gives him paper to draw his own comic, in which Pink Panther imagines himself as a superhero battling a giant villain. He gets carried away in his fantasy and is pulled into the comic where the battle continues. The villain is eventually defeated and Pink Panther returns to the store where shop owner Big Nose is impressed with the new comic and trades it for the comic Pink Panther wanted. When Big Nose opens the first page, he gets pulled into the comic and ends up being attacked by the villain as the cover page changes with his image in the front.
8a	"A Fairly Pink Pumpkin"	Ron Brewer	Ken Segall; Mauricio Pardo (story)	August 16, 2010
Farmer Big Nose dreams of having the best pumpkin in order to win the blue ribbon, but his hopes are dashed by rival pumpkin grower Pink Panther, who is able to top him every time, including Best Pumpkin Sculpture and Pumpkin Racing. Pink Panther also has a giant pumpkin that can easily win for heaviest weight, but Big Nose tries to sabotage Pink Panther, then steal it for himself. After a chase, the giant pumpkin is splattered, but Pink Panther uses it to win for Best Giant Pumpkin Pie and is awarded the blue ribbon.
8b	"If Wishes Were Ants"	Lionel Ordaz	Jim Beck, David Corbett	August 16, 2010
While chasing Ant, Aardvark is hit by a pickup truck. Among the contents that fall out is a magic lamp with a genie who grants him three wishes. Unfortunately, his wishes for speed and stickiness fail, frustrating Aardvark to the point that he unwittingly uses his final wish for the genie to go away. He realizes his error too late, and when Ant gets the lamp, he makes one wish for the genie to be free and for Aardvark to take her place when the next person finds the lamp.
8c	"Pink on the Hoof"	Ron Brewer	David Corbett, Ron Brewer	August 16, 2010
Pink Panther dreams of being a cowboy riding the open range on Horse, but the animal will not cooperate, leaving Pink Panther to struggle to wake him up and put on his horseshoes and saddle. After finally getting White Horse outside, he still will not cooperate until a female horse appears, enabling Pink Panther to have her to lead Horse around, enabling him to get his ride on the range after all. Note: Partial remake of "Pinto Pink" (1967) & "Pink Valiant" (1968).
10a	"The Pink, the Bad, and the Ugly"	Lionel Ordaz	Lionel Ordaz	August 17, 2010
In an old western town, Pink Panther is the sheriff who must face the notorious outlaw Big Nose. Big Nose seeks revenge against the Pink Panther and makes off with his sidekick White Horse and the loot from his latest bank robbery. Sheriff Pink Panther mounts a rescue and looks to apprehend the outlaws, leading to madcap mayhem along the way and a final showdown of the two opponents involving with Rock-paper-scissors. Note: Partial remake of "Vitamin Pink" (1966) and film parody of The Good, the Bad and the Ugly.
10b	"Anti-Ant Trance"	Bob Spang	Adam Beechen, David Corbett	August 17, 2010
Aardvark tries out hypnosis as a means to control his cravings for ants, but Ant exploits the opportunity to use it to control him how he wants. Aardvark's efforts to undo the hypnosis leads to more humiliation until he gets hit on the head by a coconut. Just when he is about to eat Ant, a couple of crocodiles come to the rescue and chase him away.
10c	"Shorely Pink"	Ron Brewer	Ron Brewer	August 17, 2010
At a muscle beach, muscleman Big Nose challenges Pink Panther to various games and feats of strength, but Pink Panther is able to get the better of him. The final contests include a horseshoe pitching contest, as well as a jet ski race where Pink Panther is helped by White Horse, dolphins, and sharks, who chase away Big Nose into the ocean. Note: Partial remake of "Come On In! The Water's Pink!" (1968)
15a	"Pink on the Pitch"	Ron Brewer	David Regal	August 18, 2010
Pink Panther is the star of his junior soccer team, playing against a team of giant robots controlled by Big Nose. Big Nose uses underhanded tactics to get the advantage and remove the other players on Pink Panther's team, leaving him all alone to rally against what seems an insurmountable lead. Big Nose himself operates a giant robot to overwhelm Pink Panther with soccer balls, but with a fancy move, Pink Panther defeats the robot and all the balls wind up in Big Nose's goal, giving Pink Panther the victory.
15b	"Happy Hunting"	Lionel Ordaz	Adam Beechen, Charles Horn, David Corbett	August 18, 2010
Ant seeks refuge from Aardvark by befriending a dim-witted leopard who wants to make a meal of Aardvark. Aardvark now has to use some wits of his own to outsmart the leopard before finally succeeding, but eventually, Ant outsmarts him in the end.
15c	"Catching Forty Pinks"	Ron Brewer	Ken Segall	August 18, 2010
By the end of his workday, furniture salesman Pink Panther is tired to the point where he falls asleep inside a roll-top desk that has bought and taken home by Big Nose. Efforts by his dog to alert him of the uninvited guest go unnoticed, leaving Big Nose so agitated that he chases the dog out of the house after one last booby trap to catch Pink Panther gets the better of them both. Note: Partial remake of "Slink Pink" (1969)
2a	"A Pinker Tomorrow"	Lionel Ordaz	Adam Beechen, Lionel Ordaz	August 19, 2010
In a distant, bleak, future, Pink Panther wakes up to a colorless world that's ruled by Big Nose's big-brained dog, who commands him to strip Pink Panther of his color after he finds himself able to spread color all over town. A battle ensues, and Pink Panther is victorious when he uses paint and music to get the better of the villains. He rejoices before losing his own color, only to wake up and find it was all a dream. Pink Panther sees himself get his pink color back and he is delighted to see the surrounding modern day neighborhood full of color with the lone exception being Big Nose's house, which he's painting gray ... and it looks like he's being mentally controlled by his big-brained dog's survivor, who's lurking in the shadows. Note: One scene of this episode is an homage to "The Pink Phink" (1964).
2b	"Awful Aardvark"	Bob Spang	Denise Downer, David Corbett, Ken Segall (story)	August 19, 2010
An angry aardvark storms into the jungle looking for his skateboard and scares the other animals in the process. Ant eventually finds it before losing it to the others, who are in service to Aardvark, thinking he's Awful Aardvark. Confusion arises when they see the two aardvarks, who battle to determine which is Awful. Aardvark is exposed as the phony, but Awful finds that he is afraid of Awful Ant, who orders him to clean up the jungle after the battle. Because he deceived them, the other animals then chase Aardvark.
2c	"Pinkular Mechanics"	Ron Brewer	Adam Beechen	August 19, 2010
Pink Panther's scooter breaks down, so he tries to repair it. He finds a couple of gremlin-like creatures in the engine and tries to remove them. Eventually they leave, only to get bigger when they come into contact with water. They run wild in the city, eating all metal in their path, and get even larger when Officer Big Nose sprays them with a fire hydrant and knocks them into a river. Afterward, they are big enough to begin eating all the entire city, but Pink Panther has the solution to get them back down to normal size by using a hair drier to shrink them down.
18a	"Note-Ably Pink"	Ron Brewer	Ron Brewer; David Corbett (story)	August 20, 2010
Pink Panther and Big Nose star in a concert playing varieties of music from all around the world on various instruments. A battle ensues with Big Nose losing against Pink Panther in the final number. Pink Panther closes out the concert with his harmonica. Note: Update of the classic Pink Panther cartoon "Pink, Plunk, Plink"
18b	"Shutter Bugged"	Robert Sledge	David Corbett, John McCann	August 20, 2010
A photo safari arrives in the jungle to take pictures of the animals. They think Ant is a rare striped species of insect, impeding Aardvark's efforts to make a meal of him. The two eventually tire of the people's presence, so they each devise a way to get rid of them, resulting in Aardvark getting stuck in a snare trap and Ant having to clean up after the safari ends. Ant leaves Aardvark stuck in the tree, saying he will allow their chase to resume in two weeks after all the trash is removed.
18c	"Astro Pink"	Lionel Ordaz	Lionel Ordaz, David Corbett	August 20, 2010
Space villain Big Nose shrinks several planets in the galaxy in order to make a personal marble collection. He accidentally collects a mound of soil from Earth before adding it to his collection as well. Pink Panther, who was in the mound, is the only one who is normal-sized enough to save Earth and the other planets against the evil space villain. Pink Panther is accidentally sucked into space and dons a space suit, which he is able to use it to escape Big Nose. This restores the planets to their normal sizes. Note: Partial Remake of "Star Pink".
3a	"A Pink in Time"	Cecilia Aranovich	Ken Segall	August 23, 2010
Pink Panther is an assistant to time traveler Big Nose, who has returned from the ancient Egypt with a valuable cat statue. But when his dog breaks it and Pink Panther gets the blame, he decides to use the time machine to replace statue. His use of the machine results in him going through various time periods, including the prehistoric era, ancient Rome, and eventually Egypt, where he is able to get retrieve the same statue. After a brief stint in the future, he returns home to the present where he presents Big Nose with the statue and they force the dog to clean the mess. However, it shatters again, and Pink Panther finds he went through all that trouble for nothing, since the Big Nose had 27 other copies of the same statue in his cabinet.
3b	"Quittin' Time"	Robert Sledge	Adam Beechen, David Corbett	August 23, 2010
After failing to catch Ant for the umpteenth time, Aardvark quits chasing him and tries out various other hobbies, but is provoked into resuming his chase after Ant ruins them.
3c	"Reel Pink"	Ron Brewer	Guy Toubes, David Corbett	August 23, 2010
Pink Panther does not have enough money for a ticket to see the old silent-film comedy festival at the movie theater, so he finds various methods to sneak in under Big Nose's wishes. As a result, they get into chase sequences that imitate various scenes in the films to the point where they actually wind up in the movies themselves where the chase continues to the end. Note: This episode parodies the icons Charlie Chaplin, Laurel and Hardy, "Fatty" Arbuckle and The Keystone Cops. Not to be confused with the classic cartoon of the same name (1965) where the Pink Panther goes fishing.

== Broadcast ==
In the US, the show aired on Cartoon Network and ended on August 23, 2010, after that, Boomerang reran this series and ended in 2012. The series had its Canadian premiere on Teletoon on May 11 and began airing in the UK & Ireland on Boomerang on April 19. The show also premiered in the Middle East and Africa on Boomerang on September 11. American program block KidsClick started airing reruns of the show on July 1, 2017, until the block ended on March 31, 2019. All 26 episodes were previously available on Netflix and Pluto TV, but have since been taken off the platform. It is currently available to stream on Tubi, The Roku Channel, and Prime Video, as well as on the official Pink Panther YouTube channel.
