= Slings & Arrows =

Canadian television series

- Title card
- Created by: Susan Coyne; Bob Martin; Mark McKinney
- Written by: Susan Coyne; Bob Martin; Mark McKinney
- Directed by: Peter Wellington
- Starring: Paul Gross; Martha Burns; Stephen Ouimette; Susan Coyne; Mark McKinney
- Music by: Ron Sures
- Opening theme: Greg Morrison
- Ending theme: Greg Morrison
- Country of origin: Canada
- Original language: English
- No. of seasons: 3
- No. of episodes: 18

Production
- Executive producers: Niv Fichman; Laura Michalchyshyn
- Producer: Sari Friedland
- Production locations: Ontario, Canada
- Cinematography: Rudolf Blahacek
- Editor: Christopher Donaldson
- Camera setup: Single-camera
- Running time: Approx. 47 minutes
- Production company: Rhombus Media

Original release
- Network: The Movie Network; Movie Central
- Release: November 3, 2003 – August 28, 2006

Slings & Arrows is a Canadian television series set at the fictional New Burbage Festival, a Shakespearean festival similar to the real-world Stratford Festival. It stars Paul Gross, Stephen Ouimette and Martha Burns. Rachel McAdams appeared in the first season.

The darkly comic series first aired on Canada's Movie Central and The Movie Network channels in 2003, and received acclaim in the United States when it was shown on the Sundance Channel two years later. Three six-episode seasons were filmed, with the final season airing in Canada in the summer of 2006 and in the United States in early 2007.

Slings & Arrows was created and written by former Kids in the Hall member Mark McKinney, playwright and actress Susan Coyne, and comedian Bob Martin. All three appear in it as well. The entire series was directed by Peter Wellington.

== Premise ==
Slings & Arrows centres around life at a fictional Shakespearean theatre festival in New Burbage, Canada. Each season focuses on The New Burbage Festival's production of a different play. The themes of the play are often juxtaposed with personal and professional conflicts facing the festival's cast and crew.

=== Season 1: Hamlet ===
The show's central characters are actor/director Geoffrey Tennant (Paul Gross), New Burbage artistic director Oliver Welles (Stephen Ouimette), and actress Ellen Fanshaw (Martha Burns), who seven years previously collaborated on a legendary production of Hamlet. Midway through one of the performances, Geoffrey suffered a nervous breakdown, jumped into Ophelia's grave and then ran screaming from the theater. After that, he was committed to a psychiatric institution.

When the series begins, Geoffrey is in Toronto, running a small company, "Théâtre Sans Argent" (French for "Theatre Without Money"), on the verge of being evicted. Oliver and Ellen have stayed at New Burbage, where Oliver has gradually been commercializing his productions and the festival. On the opening night of the New Burbage's A Midsummer Night's Dream, Oliver sees Geoffrey on the news, chained to his theatre in protest. Heavily drunk, Oliver calls Geoffrey from a payphone and they argue about the past. Oliver then passes out in the street and is run over and killed by a truck bearing the slogan "Canada's Best Hams".

Geoffrey's blistering eulogy at Oliver's funeral about the state of the festival leads to him being asked to take over Oliver's job on a temporary basis. After clashing with an old rival, Darren Nichols (Don McKellar), Geoffrey is reluctantly forced to take over directing the festival's latest production of Hamlet. Making this difficult are Jack Crew (Luke Kirby), the insecure American film star cast as Hamlet; Geoffrey's former lover Ellen, who is playing Gertrude and dating a much younger man; and Oliver, now haunting both Geoffrey and the festival as a ghost. Also in the play is apprentice actress Kate (Rachel McAdams), who finds herself falling for Jack.

On the business side of the festival, New Burbage manager Richard Smith-Jones (Mark McKinney) is seduced by one of his sponsors, American executive Holly Day (Jennifer Irwin) who wants to remake New Burbage into a shallow, commercialized "Shakespeareville".

=== Season 2: Macbeth ===
The second season follows the New Burbage production of Macbeth.

Richard is desperate for money to keep the company going. Geoffrey, frustrated over what he sees as a lack of commitment from his actors, suggests downsizing the company. A famous and highly egotistical actor, Henry Breedlove (Geraint Wyn Davies), arrives to star in Macbeth. Geoffrey is reluctant to direct the play due to the difficulty of staging it well, but insists that he doesn't believe in the curse of "The Scottish Play".

Richard secures a government grant to rebrand the festival. To do so, he hires an avant-garde advertising agency, Frog Hammer. Sanjay (Colm Feore), the head of Frog Hammer, launches a series of shock advertisements and manipulates Richard into accepting them.

Elsewhere at the festival, Darren has returned from an artistic rebirth in Germany to direct a version of Romeo and Juliet. His experimental staging requires the actors to not touch or even look at each other. Frustrated by this, the leading actors Sarah and Patrick seek out Geoffrey's help.

The festival's administrator, Anna Conroy (Susan Coyne), copes with an influx of interns. Among them is the ambitious Emily (Grace Lynn Kung), who can be a little too enthusiastic when enforcing theater rules. Anna begins a romance with playwright Lionel Train (Jonathan Crombie), who is doing a reading of his original play at the festival. She becomes upset when he uses her personal life in his writing, straining their relationship.

Ellen is upset that she must undergo a tax audit. Her accountant brother-in-law agrees to help, but the two argue over Ellen's shoddy record keeping.

Meanwhile, Geoffrey obsesses over directing Macbeth, antagonizing his cast and crew. He starts seeing Oliver's ghost again, which make Ellen fear for his sanity. Henry and Geoffrey develop a tense power struggle over how to handle the titular character.

=== Season 3: King Lear ===
The third season follows the New Burbage production of King Lear.

The cast of Macbeth returns home after a successful run of the production on Broadway, where an old friend of Ellen's, Barbara, tells her to think about moving beyond New Burbage. As Richard tries to cope with being a success, Anna must deal with a group of stranded musicians and Darren is back in town, this time to direct a new musical, East Hastings.

Geoffrey, meanwhile, has cast an aging theatre legend, Charles Kingman (William Hutt) as Lear, despite everyone's fears that the role will kill him. Oliver reappears and laments his inability to move on to the afterlife. As rehearsals continue, Charles terrorizes Sophie (Sarah Polley), the actress playing Cordelia. She is also involved in the rivalry between the young actors in Lear and the young actors in the musical, whose success soon overshadows the troubled Shakespeare production.

As things spiral out of control, Oliver returns to haunt and help, and Geoffrey seeks therapy from an unlikely source.

== Cast ==
- Paul Gross as Geoffrey Tennant
- Martha Burns as Ellen Fanshaw
- Stephen Ouimette as Oliver Welles
- Mark McKinney as Richard Smith-Jones
- Susan Coyne as Anna Conroy
- Catherine Fitch as Maria
- Michael Polley as Frank
- Graham Harley as Cyril
- Don McKellar as Darren Nichols
- Rothaford Gray as Nahum
- Rachel McAdams as Kate McNab (Season 1)
- Luke Kirby as Jack Crew (Season 1)
- Jennifer Irwin as Holly Day (Season 1)
- Sabrina Grdevich as Claire Donner (Season 1)
- Marcia Bennett as May Silverstone (Season 1)
- Matt Fitzgerald as Sloan (Season 1, 2)
- Seán Cullen as Basil (Season 1, 2)
- Oliver Dennis as Jerry (Season 2, 3)
- Leon Pownall as Brian (Season 2)
- Geraint Wyn Davies as Henry Breedlove (Season 2)
- Colm Feore as Sanjay (Season 2)
- David Alpay as Patrick (Season 2)
- Joanne Kelly as Sarah (Season 2)
- Grace Lynn Kung as Emily Lu (Season 2)
- Jonathan Crombie as Lionel Train (Season 2)
- Joanne Boland as Margaret (Season 2)
- Peter Keleghan as Mr. Archer (Season 2, 3)
- William Hutt as Charles Kingman (Season 3)
- Janet Bailey as Barbara (Season 3)
- Aaron Abrams as Paul (Season 3)
- Sarah Polley as Sophie (Season 3)
- Melanie Merkosky as Megan (Season 3)
- Damien Atkins as Nigel Harrison (Season 3)
- Chris Leavins as Andrew McTeague (Season 3)

== Episodes ==
Season	Episodes	Originally released	
Season	Episodes	First released	Last released
1	6	November 3, 2003	December 8, 2003
2	6	June 27, 2005	August 1, 2005
3	6	July 24, 2006	August 28, 2006

=== Season 1 (2003) ===
No. overall	No. in season	Title	Directed by	Written by	Original release date
1	1	"Oliver's Dream"	Peter Wellington	Susan Coyne, Bob Martin & Mark McKinney	November 3, 2003
Oliver Welles, the creative director of the New Burbage Shakespearean Festival, struggles to be enthusiastic with his production of A Midsummer Night's Dream. This greatly frustrates the leading lady, Ellen Fanshaw. Oliver's former protégé, Geoffrey Tennant, loses his small theatre company when the money runs out. The New Burbage Festival's business manager, Richard Smith-Jones, is drawn to American executive Holly Day, who represents a major sponsor. While passed out drunk, Oliver is hit and killed by a truck.
2	2	"Geoffrey Returns"	Peter Wellington	Susan Coyne, Bob Martin & Mark McKinney	November 10, 2003
After Oliver's death, Geoffrey is installed as the festival's interim creative director. He accepts, although some people question if he's mentally stable enough for the job. It's well known that, seven years ago, Geoffrey had a nervous breakdown on stage while playing the lead in a production of Hamlet that co-starred Ellen and was directed by Oliver. Geoffrey and Ellen try to be professional, despite having been a romantic couple in the past and their relationship ending badly.
3	3	"Madness in Great Ones"	Peter Wellington	Susan Coyne, Bob Martin & Mark McKinney	November 17, 2003
Geoffrey tries to settle into his new job, but Oliver's ghost keeps appearing and berating him. Geoffrey has refused to direct the season's production of Hamlet, which has stunt cast movie star Jack Crew as the lead. Ellen encourages the other actors to shun Geoffrey. Controversial director Darren Nichols takes over the production and begins insisting on extravagant sets and pyrotechnics. Geoffrey reaches a breaking point and challenges Darren to a sword duel at a party in Ellen's house.
4	4	"Outrageous Fortune"	Peter Wellington	Susan Coyne, Bob Martin & Mark McKinney	November 24, 2003
After the duel at the party, which trashed Ellen's home, the police arrested Geoffrey. While in a jail cell, Geoffrey and Oliver try to figure out if the former is crazy or the latter is a real ghost. Jack romantically pursues Kate, an actress at the festival and the understudy for Ophelia. However, fellow actress Claire warns her about being seen as a social climber, which causes Kate to have reservations. Ellen's younger boyfriend, Sloan, punches Geoffrey and Darren for making the mess at her house.
5	5	"A Mirror up to Nature"	Peter Wellington	Susan Coyne, Bob Martin & Mark McKinney	December 1, 2003
Geoffrey has agreed to direct Hamlet. Kate decides she'd rather be with Jack than worry about what others think. Oliver manages to scare Claire into injuring herself so the more talented Kate can take over the role of Ophelia. The production is presented with a difficult situation when Richard takes away all their preview performances. Holly plans to turn the New Burbage Festival into a highly-commercialized "Shakespeareville" that will emphasize mainstream musicals. Jack's confidence is shattered when Richard tells him that no one expects him to be a good Hamlet.
6	6	"Playing the Swan"	Peter Wellington	Susan Coyne, Bob Martin & Mark McKinney	December 8, 2003
Jack has disappeared just before the opening night of Hamlet. Geoffrey worries that he was too harsh on Jack. Oliver admits that his own bullying tactics as a director "had nothing to do with good theatre," but rather stemmed from his own personal issues. Geoffrey and Ellen confront what led to his breakdown and the events that followed. Jack's confidence is boosted by Geoffrey's kind words and the play is a success. Richard realizes that Holly is cruel and manipulative, and so he sends her and the plans for Shakespeareville packing.

=== Season 2 (2005) ===
No. overall	No. in season	Title	Directed by	Written by	Original release date
7	1	"Season's End"	Peter Wellington	Susan Coyne, Bob Martin & Mark McKinney	June 27, 2005
After losing multiple sponsors, Richard hopes a government grant will save the festival. He also wants Geoffrey to direct Macbeth, but is initially refused. Ellen realizes the age gap between her and Sloan is too big for their relationship to succeed, and so she breaks up with him. Kate gives up the role of Juliet so she can marry Jack and go the US with him. Geoffrey agrees to direct Macbeth as a tribute to Oliver, who always wanted to stage his own production but never did. Geoffrey and Ellen become a couple again.
8	2	"Fallow Time"	Peter Wellington	Susan Coyne, Bob Martin & Mark McKinney	July 4, 2005
Richard revives the festival intern program, which creates chaos in the office for festival administrator, Anna. Geoffrey and Ellen try living together. Richard hires edgy advertising agency Frog Hammer to oversee the festival's rebranding. Geoffrey looks over concepts that Oliver left behind for staging Macbeth. Famous Shakespearian actor Henry Breedlove arrives to play the lead.
9	3	"Rarer Monsters"	Peter Wellington	Susan Coyne, Bob Martin & Mark McKinney	July 11, 2005
Darren is hired to direct Romeo and Juliet. Geoffrey becomes obsessed with directing Macbeth and begins spending late nights at the theater conversing with Oliver. Ellen worries that his sanity is slipping. Henry undermines Geoffrey's authority in front of the cast and crew at rehearsals. Ellen, unable to cope with Geoffrey's erratic behavior, breaks up with him and he moves out.
10	4	"Fair Is Foul and Foul Is Fair"	Peter Wellington	Susan Coyne, Bob Martin & Mark McKinney	July 18, 2005
Frog Hammer's offensive advertising campaign causes older subscribers to cancel en masse. Richard fears this will ruin the festival, but ad exec Sanjay convinces him to trust the strategy. Darren strips Romeo and Juliet of all its warmth and romance, to the chagrin of his leads, Sarah and Patrick. Ellen is infuriated that her taxes are being audited. Disagreements over how to handle the character of Macbeth leads Geoffrey to fire Henry.
11	5	"Steeped in Blood"	Peter Wellington	Susan Coyne, Bob Martin & Mark McKinney	July 25, 2005
Despite Darren's anti-romance concept, the actors playing Romeo and Juliet have fallen in love. The police inform Richard that Sanjay is a con artist. With all the rebranding money gone, Richard is set to lose his job. Ellen owes a large amount of money in back taxes. After firing Henry, Macbeth goes ahead with understudy Jerry, resulting in a vindication of Geoffrey's unconventional creative choices. Ellen, however, convinces Geoffrey that Henry is the better actor for the role. Henry wants to come back, but he remains egotistical and rude.
12	6	"Birnam Wood"	Peter Wellington	Susan Coyne, Bob Martin & Mark McKinney	August 1, 2005
Young adults respond to Frog Hammer's ad campaign and start buying tickets, saving Richard's job. Geoffrey manipulates Darren into restoring the romance in Romeo and Juliet. To put Henry in his place, Geoffrey makes sudden changes to Macbeth's staging that knock Henry off-kilter. Richard auditions for a musical and learns how difficult rejection can be as an actor. Geoffrey tries to sever his ties with Oliver's ghost once and for all. After Sloan chastises them for breaking up, Geoffrey and Ellen go home together.

=== Season 3 (2006) ===
No. overall	No. in season	Title	Directed by	Written by	Original release date
13	1	"Divided Kingdom"	Peter Wellington	Susan Coyne, Bob Martin & Mark McKinney	July 24, 2006
Geoffrey feels the pressure as creative director, causing emotional issues in his work life and trouble in the bedroom. Richard initially basks in the glory of the New Burbage festival's newfound success, but soon suffers from imposter syndrome. Geoffrey decides to cast the notoriously difficult Charles Kingman as King Lear. In an effort to discover his creative side, Richard decides to act as a creative consultant on the original musical production East Hastings, directed by Darren Nichols.
14	2	"Vex Not His Ghost"	Peter Wellington	Susan Coyne, Bob Martin & Mark McKinney	July 31, 2006
Anna feels she must help Los Perdidos, a Bolivian band that's become stranded at New Burbage due to a coup in their home country. Ellen's friend and fellow actress, Barbara, moves in to Ellen and Geoffrey's home for the duration of King Lear. Rehearsals begin and Charles is a bully to his costars. Geoffrey starts therapy with Minister McTeague, only to have Oliver's ghost reappear. Tensions arise between the younger cast members of King Lear and East Hastings. Charles confides in Geoffrey that he has cancer and only few months to live.
15	3	"That Way Madness Lies"	Peter Wellington	Susan Coyne, Bob Martin & Mark McKinney	August 7, 2006
Geoffrey worries that the role of Lear will be too difficult for the ailing Charles. Oliver, however, believes that fulfilling Charles' dying wish to play the role will be the good deed that allows Oliver to move on to the afterlife. King Lear cast member, Paul, falls for the musical lead, Megan. This aggravates Paul's castmate, Sophie. Barbara and Geoffrey butt heads, leading him to move in with Charles. Geoffrey learns that Charles is addicted to heroin. Richard suggests how to fix the musical's plot, and the changes are well received in previews.
16	4	"Every Inch a King"	Peter Wellington	Susan Coyne, Bob Martin & Mark McKinney	August 14, 2006
Anna continues to juggle the Bolivian band and the troubled King Lear production. Richard, high off his creative success, neglects practical matters. Geoffrey decides to stop going to therapy after an especially difficult session. Ellen considers taking a lucrative TV role. When Charles is a no-show on opening night, the show is canceled. Geoffrey learns that Charles fell, and he can now see and converse with Oliver's ghost. Anna offers to help Geoffrey manage Charles' medications. Richard moves Lear out of the large Rose Theatre and into a smaller venue.
17	5	"All Blessed Secrets"	Peter Wellington	Susan Coyne, Bob Martin & Mark McKinney	August 21, 2006
When Anna gets Charles off of heroin and adjusts his medications, his acting improves. The musical takes Lear's place in the Rose Theater. A drunken Barbara rants about how Ellen's life is depressing. After Charles pushes Ellen down during rehearsal, she quits and breaks up with Geoffrey. He convinces her to come back to the play by revealing that Charles has cancer. Richard shows appreciation for Anna and she's moved, until she learns he's on ecstasy. Charles mentally deteriorates before the show's reopening, leading to another cancelation. Barbara informs Richard about Charles' cancer, which Ellen told her in confidence. Richard cancels Lear's entire run. Sophie confesses to Paul that she's in love with him.
18	6	"The Promised End"	Peter Wellington	Susan Coyne, Bob Martin & Mark McKinney	August 28, 2006
The New Burbage Festival insurance claim for the losses of King Lear is deemed valid on the condition Geoffrey resign, to which he agrees. Ellen and Barbara's friendship has fallen apart. In a brief remission, Charles still wants to perform King Lear. Minister McTeague allows Geoffrey to stage the play in the church, and he gathers the cast and crew. Richard hires Darren as the festival's new creative director. Charles gives a tour de force performance. Barbara and Ellen repair their friendship. Oliver lets go of his ego and moves on to the afterlife. Paul realizes he is in love with Sophie. Charles dies peacefully after the show. After Anna is fired for supporting the unsanctioned performance, she goes to Bolivia to help fight the coup. Richard plans to direct Oklahoma!. Ellen quits the TV show, is sued, and loses her house. She and Geoffrey marry and decide to move to Montreal to restart his old theater company: Théâtre Sans Argent.

== Background and production ==
=== Development and writing ===
In the late 1990s, Tecca Crosby pitched the idea of a half-hour comedy about a theatre festival to producer Niv Fichman. Fichman recruited Susan Coyne to write the pilot, which at the time was called Over The Top. Mark McKinney later joined the project, followed by Bob Martin. Coyne, McKinney, and Martin are listed as the show's creators, and share writing credits on all 18 episodes.

The series was produced by Rhombus Media for The Movie Network and Showcase.

=== Filming ===
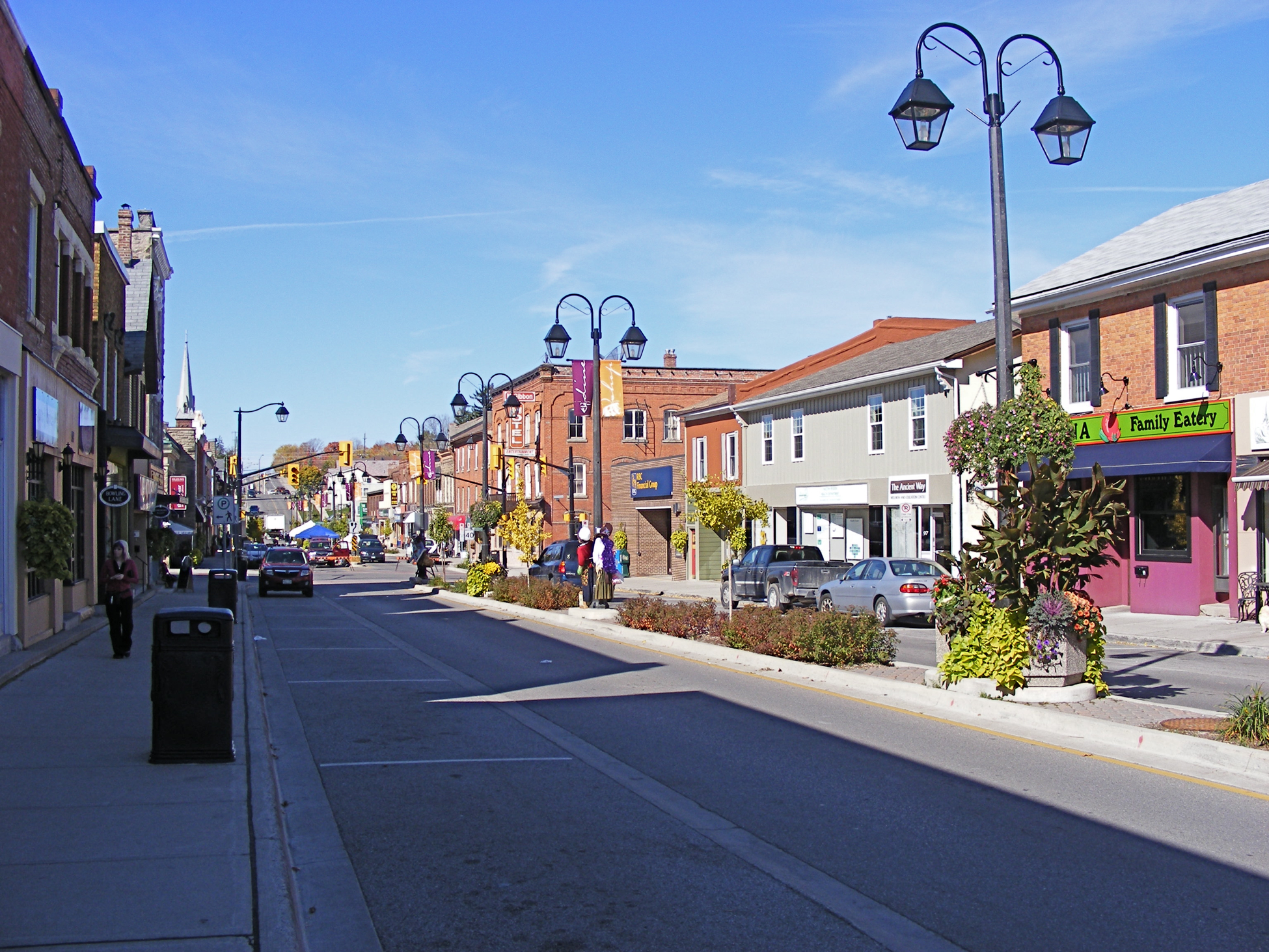
Scenes of the fictional town of New Burbage were filmed on Main Street in Georgetown, Ontario.

Filming took place in southern Ontario, Canada. The lobby of the fictional Swan Theatre is Toronto's Ed Mirvish Theatre. Interior theatre scenes were filmed in Hamilton's Tivoli Theatre in season one and in Brantford's Sanderson Centre in seasons two and three. The Studio Theatre where season three's East Hastings performs is the main stage of Theatre Passe Muraille in Toronto. Other locations included the Blue Goose Tavern in Toronto, and Yong's Restaurant in Georgetown.

=== Remake ===
In 2009, a remake of Slings & Arrows, titled Som & Furia (“Sound & Fury”), aired on Brazil's Rede Globo network. The 12-part Portuguese-language miniseries was produced and co-directed by Fernando Meirelles.

=== Possible prequel ===
As of November 2019, the creators were shopping a prequel to Slings & Arrows called The Amateurs about the origins of The New Burbage Festival in the 1950s.

== Reception ==
=== Awards and nominations ===
In its three seasons, Slings & Arrows was nominated for 50 awards across several categories, and won 22 awards for acting, writing, direction, editing and more.

It won 13 Gemini Awards. It was nominated for Best Dramatic Series every season it aired, and won twice. It won at least two Gemini awards for acting in every season, winning three in each of 2006 and 2007.

In addition to the Gemini Awards, the series swept Best Drama (One Hour) from the Writers Guild of Canada all three times it was nominated, and won Outstanding Television Series – Drama Awards from the Directors Guild of Canada in 2006 and 2007. The Writers Guild of Canada nominated three of its episodes for Best Drama Series in 2004.

Other awards included a Canadian Comedy Award in 2005 for Television – Pretty Funny Writing – Series, and a Satellite Award in 2006 for Best DVD Release of a TV Show.

This table summarizes award wins by cast members:

Actor	Awards won
Paul Gross	Gemini, Best Performance by an Actor in a Continuing Leading Dramatic Role (2004, 2007)
Stephen Ouimette	Gemini, Best Performance by an Actor in a Featured Supporting Role in a Dramatic Series (2007)
Martha Burns	Gemini, Best Performance by an Actress in a Continuing Leading Dramatic Role (2006, 2007)
Mark McKinney	Gemini, Best Performance by an Actor in a Continuing Leading Dramatic Role (2006)
Susan Coyne	Gemini, Best Performance by an Actress in a Featured Supporting Role in a Dramatic Series (2006)
Rachel McAdams	Gemini, Best Performance by an Actress in a Featured Supporting Role in a Dramatic Series (2004)

Many cast members—guests as well as regulars—were Gemini-nominated for their work on Slings & Arrows but did not win, including Jennifer Irwin, Sarah Polley, Chris Leavins, Don McKellar and William Hutt.
