= Deborah Day =

Canadian film director and writer

Deborah Day is a Canadian film director and writer.

She directed and co-wrote the film Expecting (2002), starring Valerie Buhagiar, Colin Mochrie and Debra McGrath which won Most Popular Canadian Film at the 2002 Vancouver International Film Festival and the 2004 Canadian Comedy Award for Best Director.

With Mochrie and McGrath she also directed and co-wrote the CBC TV movie Getting Along Famously (2005), and later also directed the TV show of the same name.
