= Peter Wellington (director) =

Canadian film and television director

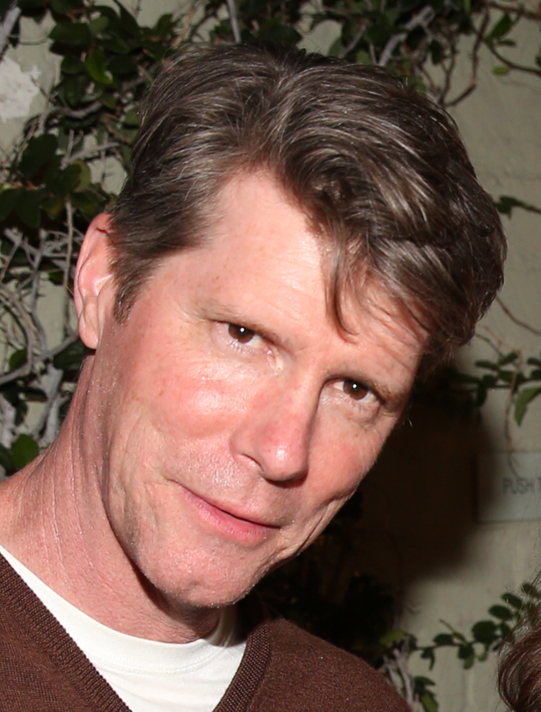
- Peter Wellington at a CFC event
- Occupations: film and television director
- Known for: Joe's So Mean to Josephine, Cottage Country, Slings and Arrows

Peter Wellington is a Canadian film and television director. His films have included Joe's So Mean to Josephine, for which he won the Claude Jutra Award in 1996, Luck (2003) and Cottage Country (2013).

Wellington has also directed the television series Slings and Arrows and episodes of the series 18 to Life (including its pilot), Traders, Exhibit A: Secrets of Forensic Science, The Eleventh Hour, Rent-a-Goalie, Being Erica, Single White Spenny, Rookie Blue, Saving Hope and Kim's Convenience.

His brother David also works in film and television, and has directed eight episodes of the Canadian supernatural medical drama Saving Hope.
