= George Westerholm =

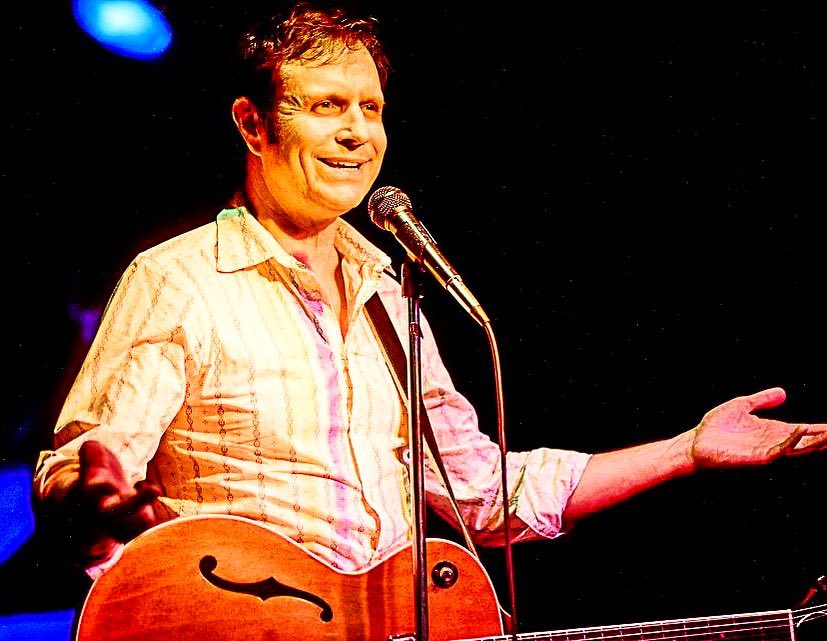
Westernholm photographed by Rob Trick in 2017

George Westerholm is a Canadian musician, singer, comedian and writer. He has won three Canadian Comedy Awards for his work as a writer on This Hour Has 22 Minutes and The Toronto Show.

== Comedy ==
In the 1980s and early 1990s, Westerholm was part of the comedy duo Al & George with Lara Rae (then using the name Al). Following their breakup, he turned his attention primarily to music and writing rather than standup comedy performance.

== Musical career ==
Westerholm was part of a Toronto trio called Sinphonic in the mid-1990s, which released two cassettes and two CDs. He performed on both vocals and guitars, along with John Bowker (vocals, bass) and Dino Naccarato (drums). The group was "called everything from punk/surf to 'suave-garage', with influences from the style of Red Snapper to the recklessness of Link Wray."

Westerholm has also released a self-titled 6-track EP which includes his best-known song, "Trevor", and he was planning to release another one in the fall of 2006. "Trevor" achieved some notoriety after being played nationally on the CBC Radio One program DNTO.

== Discography ==
With Sinphonic

- Music by Sinphonic – cassette
- Ammunition – CD
- Live at the El Mocambo – cassette
- Man Vs. Himself – CD

Solo albums

- George Westerholm
