= The Toronto Show =

The Toronto Show is a Canadian television variety show, which aired from 2003 to 2004 on Toronto's independent station Toronto 1.

The show was taped live before a studio audience at Trinity Studio's in downtown Toronto's distillery district, the Toronto Show features several guest bands, performers, and comedians every night. The show was hosted by Enis Esmer, except for a series of specials hosted by Alan Park, Sean Cullen and others.
