= Children's programming on the American Broadcasting Company =

Historical summary of children's programming aired on ABC

ABC Logo

In regard to children's programming, the American Broadcasting Company (ABC) has aired mostly programming from Walt Disney Television or other producers (most notably, Hanna-Barbera Productions, Warner Bros. Entertainment, Nelvana and DIC Entertainment). This article outlines the history of children's television programming on ABC including the various blocks and notable programs that have aired throughout the television network's history.

== History ==
=== Early programming (1950–1996) ===
In August 1950, the American Broadcasting Company (ABC) produced and aired its first Saturday morning children's shows, Acrobat Ranch and Animal Clinic.

In 1971, as a response to the noncommercial success of Sesame Street, ABC made an attempt to imitate the format commercially with Curiosity Shop, which targeted a slightly older audience.

From 1973 to 1985, ABC aired the award-winning Schoolhouse Rock! series of educational shorts as interstitials. The shorts mixed original songs and animation with lessons on basic school subjects such as mathematics, science, and history. It returned to ABC's Saturday morning schedule in 1992, and a fifth season was released from 1994 to 1996. Schoolhouse Rock! was one of several animated interstitials that aired during this time; others included Time for Timer and The Bod Squad, both of which were discontinued in the 1980s.

In 1975, ABC's Saturday block was branded as "Funshine Saturday." It most famously featured Uncle Croc's Block, an intentionally inept production that was meant to satirize the genre; neither ABC executives nor the viewing audience grasped creator Lou Scheimer's vision, and the show, in a rarity for the Saturday morning block, was cancelled midseason, allowing Scheimer to pocket the rest of the season's budget but, in a Pyrrhic victory, led to Scheimer's company Filmation being dumped from ABC's Saturday lineup. The subsequent revamp in 1976 under incoming network head Fred Silverman (whom Scheimer had respected as the executive who established the Saturday morning cartoon in its familiar form) featured a mix of cartoons from Hanna-Barbera and live-action series, including the 90-minute The Krofft Supershow. As this left Hanna-Barbera with a de facto monopoly on ABC's cartoon output (since Rankin/Bass had largely moved away from the format by 1974 and was focusing on specials by this time), Silverman poached two of Hanna-Barbera's lead writers to produce content of their own, Ruby-Spears Enterprises, in an effort to keep Hanna-Barbera from becoming complacent.

In 1986, ABC made a brief effort to shift its program block to target younger audiences with lighter fare such as Little Clowns of Happytown and The Care Bears Family, shows that were strongly influenced by the consulting firm Q5, which heavily sanitized the scripts. By 1988, the network had fallen to a distant third in the ratings, a problem that ABC executives blamed on the people meter, which had recently been introduced as an audience measurement tool and which ABC believed young children were not capable of operating. ABC responded to the crash by eliminating almost all of its preschool programming and replacing it with programs capable of appealing to a whole family audience, most successfully with The New Adventures of Winnie the Pooh and reviving the Scooby-Doo franchise with A Pup Named Scooby-Doo.

At the start of the 1991–92 season, executive producer Jim Janicek brought the hosted programming block concept, one that he had successfully implemented in the Friday night time slot with TGIF, to Saturday mornings, under the brand More Cool TV. Stars from live-action series aired as part of the Saturday morning lineup, most notably including the cast of ABC's Land of the Lost revival, hosted interstitials every half-hour during the block.

From 1992 to 1995, short 30-second segments from America's Funniest People, which were branded as America's Funniest Kids, ran within commercial breaks during the ABC Saturday morning lineup. These would usually consist of excerpts from longer segments, usually featuring young children telling jokes or engaging in stunts.

=== Disney programming era (1996–2011) ===
ABC Kids

The merger of Capital Cities Communications into The Walt Disney Company in 1996 marked a shift in the network's Saturday morning cartoon output. The merger resulted in Disney increasing the amount of programming content it produced for the network, including in regards to children's programming. Following the merger, in fall 1996, ABC's Saturday Morning lineup debuted the fifth season of Doug (which had been acquired from Nickelodeon that year) the third season of Gargoyles (which had previously aired on The Disney Afternoon), Mighty Ducks, and Jungle Cubs. The following spring, it debuted the original animated series Nightmare Ned and began airing reruns of Ducktales.

Disney's One Saturday Morning debuted on September 13, 1997, formatted as a two-hour sub-block (before expanding to become the sole brand for the Saturday morning lineup in 1998) that originally featured some programs that had already aired on the co-existing ABC Saturday Morning lineup and incorporated live-action and animated interstitials. It was originally scheduled to premiere on September 6, but was delayed by one week due to ABC News' coverage of the funeral of Diana, Princess of Wales. The company's president and CEO Michael Eisner sought to create a Saturday morning block that was different from those carried by its competitors at the time, recruiting Peter Hastings (who had left Warner Bros. Animation in a creative dispute over Animaniacs and Pinky and the Brain, which he had both written for) to help overhaul ABC's Saturday morning lineup. The concept that was developed revolved around the idea that Saturday is different from every other day of the week; Hastings also came up with the idea of utilizing virtual set technology for the hosted interstitial segments. Disney would later create a spin-off block, Disney's One Too, which debuted on UPN on September 6, 1999, which featured many of the programs shown on Disney’s One Saturday Morning. The hosted and animated segments were dropped from One Saturday Morning in 2000 in a cost-cutting measure.

In 2001, ABC entered into a program distribution agreement with sister network Disney Channel to air its original programming as part of the network's Saturday morning lineup. As a result, live-action series were added to the Disney’s One Saturday Morning lineup that September as part of the newly created "Zoog Hour," an hour-long sub-block – named after the cable channel's weekend programming block at the time, Zoog Disney – featuring the Disney Channel sitcoms Lizzie McGuire and Even Stevens (the programming agreement occasionally extended to broadcasts of Disney Channel's made-for-TV movies as part of The Wonderful World of Disney between 2002 and 2008). Additionally, Disney acquired the rights to the Power Rangers franchise after its purchase of Fox Family Worldwide, which included the rights to the majority of the program libraries of Fox Kids, and the outright purchase of the production studio behind Power Rangers and Fox Kids Worldwide part-owner Saban Entertainment (the purchase was primarily designed to acquire the Fox Family Channel, which was rebranded as ABC Family following the sale's completion).

In 2002, Disney’s One Saturday Morning was rebranded as ABC Kids. Upon the relaunch of the block, in addition to the Disney Channel series, ABC Kids contained two original series (Teamo Supremo and Fillmore!) and reruns of a former Disney’s One Saturday Morning series (Recess). ABC also acquired the rights to NBA Inside Stuff through the network's acquisition of broadcast television rights to the NBA from NBC (where the series originally premiered in 1992), which aired alongside the ABC Kids block during the 2002–03 and 2003–04 seasons, before being replaced by NBA Access for the 2004–05 season. NBA Inside Stuff would return on NBA TV in 2013.

However, reruns of Disney Channel original live-action and animated series (with shows such as Kim Possible, The Proud Family, and That’s So Raven joining Lizzie McGuire and Even Stevens) came to dominate the lineup by 2003. To comply with the Children's Television Act, ABC chose to carry only select episodes of Disney Channel series featuring moral lessons and/or educational anecdotes. ABC Kids ceased to import new Disney Channel series onto its schedule after the 2006–07 season, when Hannah Montana, The Emperor's New School, and The Replacements were added to the block. As a result, the block (outside of Power Rangers) relied entirely on repeats of the channel's shows that first aired on ABC Kids from 2005 to 2007 for the remaining three years of its run (all of which, most notably That's So Raven, were out of production by September 2011). Power Rangers ended its run on ABC Kids in 2010 after Haim Saban repurchased the franchise's intellectual rights from Disney and leased the broadcast rights to Nickelodeon, which began airing new seasons and repeat episodes of the series starting in 2011.

=== Litton's Weekend Adventure era (2011–present) ===
Weekend Adventure logo

In 2010, ABC decided that it would no longer provide E/I-compliant programming as part of its Saturday morning network lineup to its affiliates, with the network's affiliate board agreeing to seek a syndication package that would air exclusively on ABC owned-and-operated and affiliate stations. ABC announced a time-lease agreement with Litton Entertainment (now Hearst Media Production Group) to produce a new Saturday morning block, originally titled ABC Weekend Adventure, which was subsequently renamed Litton's Weekend Adventure, prior to its debut in 2011 (ending the entirety of conventional children's programming – animated or otherwise – airing on ABC).

The block, designed by Litton to counterprogramming the then-traditional Saturday morning fare of animated and live-action scripted series, features unscripted and "pro-social programming"; however, the block is not structured as a conventional Saturday morning lineup, in that purchased advertisements within the block are commercials that would otherwise be targeted at the 18–49 demographic and shows within the block, while educational in nature, are marketed for a family audience – although intended to be aimed at teenagers ages 13–16 – rather than just children.

== Programming ==
=== Scheduling issues ===
Programs featured on the current Litton's Weekend Adventure lineup are designed to meet federally mandated educational programming guidelines. However, as with its predecessor network-programmed blocks, programs may be deferred to Sunday daytime slots, or (in the case of affiliates in the Western United States) Saturday afternoons due to breaking news or severe weather coverage or, more commonly, regional or select national sports telecasts (especially in the case of college football games) scheduled in earlier Saturday timeslots as makegoods to comply with the E/I regulations. Some stations may air the entirety of the Weekend Adventure block on tape delay to accommodate local news or other programs of local interest (such as public affairs shows, real estate or lifestyle programs).

Honolulu affiliate KITV (channel 4) aired programs within the former ABC Kids and the current Weekend Adventure lineups over three weekdays (Tuesday, Wednesday and Thursday), with two programs airing each day from 11:00 a.m. to 12:00 p.m., preceding the ABC Daytime lineup (in particular, the network's soap operas prior to 2012). This scheduling is used only in the event of Saturday afternoon sports telecasts broadcast by ABC – which due to the time difference between the Hawaii–Aleutian Time Zone and the United States mainland, may air live as early as five hours behind the game's airtime in the Eastern Time Zone, or six hours during Daylight Saving Time (as Hawaii runs on Standard Time year-round), effectively pre-empting ABC Kids programs from their regular timeslots and forcing the shows to air elsewhere on the station's schedule; this is particularly true of late morning and primetime college football games aired during the fall (for instance, a college football game with a 3:30 p.m. Eastern Time kick off would air in Hawaii at 9:30 a.m. Hawaii–Aleutian Time).

During the college football season, ABC affiliates in the Western U.S. will often realign programming for college football telecasts that have a 9:00 a.m. Pacific Time start (as a noon Eastern Time game is often scheduled). Some affiliates moved the ABC Kids programming to Sunday mornings (something that is still sometimes the case with the Weekend Adventure lineup); however, until all Sunday-afternoon NASCAR races moved to ESPN in 2010, this usually pre-empted the pre-race show ESPN NASCAR Countdown.

=== List of programs ===
- 101 Dalmatians: The Series (1997–1999)
- The ABC Saturday Superstar Movie (1972–1974)
- ABC Weekend Specials (1977–1997)
- Acrobat Ranch (1950–1951)
- The Addams Family (1992–1995)
- The Adventures of Gulliver (1968–1970)
- Adventures of the Gummi Bears (1989–1990)
- Aliens in the Family (1996)
- The All-New Pink Panther Show (1978–1979)
- American Bandstand (1957–1987)
- Animals, Animals, Animals (1976–1981)
- Animal Crack-Ups (1987–1990)
- Annie Oakley (1964–1965; reruns of the 1954-1957 primetime series)
- Beany and Cecil (1962–1968)
- The Beatles (1965–1969)
- Beetlejuice (1989–1992)
- Bewitched (1971–1973; reruns of the 1964–1972 primetime series)
- Bone Chillers (1996–1997)
- The Brady Kids (1972–1974)
- Buffalo Bill, Jr. (1964–1965; reruns of the 1955–1956 primetime series)
- The Bugs Bunny Show and later incarnations (1960–1968, 1973–1975, 1985–2000)
- Bump in the Night (1994–1996)
- Buzz Lightyear of Star Command (2000–2001)
- The Buzz on Maggie (2005–2006; reruns of Disney Channel series)
- Captain Caveman and the Teen Angels (1977–1979)
- The Care Bears Family (1986–1988)
- The Cattanooga Cats (1969–1971)
- Cro (1993–1995)
- Curiosity Shop (1971–1972)
- Darkwing Duck (1991–1993)
- Devlin (1974–1976)
- Disney's Doug (1996–2001)
- DuckTales (1997)
- Dudley Do-Right (1969–1970)
- Dumb and Dumber: The Animated Series (1995–1996)
- Dynomutt, Dog Wonder (1976–1978)
- The Emperor's New School (2006–2011; reruns of Disney Channel series)
- Even Stevens (2001–2002, 2005; reruns of Disney Channel series)
- Fangface (1978–1980)
- Fantastic Four (1967–1970)
- Fantastic Voyage (1968–1970)
- Fillmore! (2002–2005)
- Flash Forward (1996)
- The Flintstone Kids (1986–1990)
- Fonz and the Happy Days Gang (1980–1982)
- Free Willy (1994–1996)
- Fudge (1995–1996)
- The Funky Phantom (1971–1973)
- Gargoyles: The Goliath Chronicles (1996–1997)
- George of the Jungle (1967–1970; 1995; 1997)
- Goldie Gold and Action Jack (1981–1982)
- Goober and the Ghost Chasers (1973)
- Goof Troop (1992–1993)
- The Great Grape Ape Show (1975–1976)
- Groovie Goolies (reruns from 1971–1972 CBS series) (1975–1976)
- Hammerman (1991–1992)
- Hannah Montana (2006–2011; reruns of Disney Channel series)
- The Hardy Boys (1969–1971)
- Heathcliff (1980–1982)
- Hercules: The Animated Series (1998–1999)
- Here Come the Double Deckers (1970–1972)
- Hong Kong Phooey (1974–1976)
- Hoppity Hooper (1964–1967)
- Hot Wheels (1969–1971)
- House of Mouse (2001–2002)
- H.R. Pufnstuf (1972–1973; reruns of the 1969 NBC series)
- Jabberjaw (1976–1978)
- Jackson 5ive (1971–1973)
- The Jetsons (1963–1964; reruns of the 1962–1963 primetime series)
- Jonny Quest (1970–1972; repeats of the 1964–1965 primetime series)
- Journey to the Center of the Earth (1967–1969)
- Jungle Cubs (1996–1998)
- Junior Almost Anything Goes (1976–1978)
- Kid Power (1972–1974)
- Kim Possible (2002–2006; reruns of Disney Channel series)
- The King Kong Show (1966–1969)
- Krofft Supershow (1976–1978)
- Laff-A-Lympics (1977–1979, 1986)
- Lancelot Link, Secret Chimp (1970–1972)
- Land of the Lost (1991–1994)
- Lassie's Rescue Rangers (1973–1975)
- Laverne & Shirley in the Army (1981–1982)
- Lidsville (1971–1973)
- Lilo & Stitch: The Series (2003–2006)
- Linus the Lionhearted (1966–1969; repeats of the 1964–1966 CBS series)
- Little Clowns of Happytown (1987–1988)
- The Little Rascals (1982–1984)
- Little Rosie (1990–1991)
- The Littles (1983–1986)
- Lizzie McGuire (2001–2005; reruns of Disney Channel series)
- Lloyd in Space (2001–2002)
- The Lost Saucer (1975-1976)
- Madeline (1995)
- The Magic Land of Allakazam (1962–1964)
- Magic Ranch (1961–1962)
- The Magilla Gorilla Show (1965–1967)
- Make a Face (1962–1963)
- Make a Wish (1971–1976)
- Mary-Kate and Ashley in Action! (2001–2002)
- Matty's Funday Funnies (1960–1962)
- The Mickey Mouse Club (1955–1959)
- Mickey Mouse Works (1999–2000)
- Mighty Ducks (1996–1997)
- Mighty Morphin Power Rangers (2010)
- Mighty Orbots (1984–1985)
- Milton the Monster (1965–1968)
- Mission: Magic! (1973–1974)
- Monchichis (1983–1984)
- The Monkees (1972–1973; repeats of the 1966–1968 NBC series)
- Mork & Mindy/Laverne & Shirley/Fonz Hour (1982–1983)
- The Mumbly Cartoon Show (1976–1977)
- My Friend Flicka (1962–1964; repeats of the 1956–1957 primetime series)
- My Pet Monster (1987–1988)
- NBA Inside Stuff (2002–2004)
- The New Adventures of Beany and Cecil (1988)
- The New Adventures of Gilligan (1974–1977)
- The New Adventures of Winnie the Pooh (1988–1993, 1995–2002)
- The New Casper Cartoon Show (1963–1970)
- New Kids on the Block (1990–1991)
- Nightmare Ned (1997)
- The Oddball Couple (1975–1977)
- On Your Mark (1961–1962)
- The Osmonds (1972–1974)
- The Oz Kids (1996)
- Pac-Man (1982–1984)
- Pepper Ann (1997–2001)
- Peter Potamus (1966–1967; new episodes combined with repeats of the 1964 syndicated series)
- Phil of the Future (2004–2006; reruns of Disney Channel series)
- The Pirates of Dark Water (1991–1992)
- The Plastic Man Comedy/Adventure Show (1979–1981)
- Pound Puppies (1985–1989)
- Power Rangers Dino Thunder (2004–05)
- Power Rangers Jungle Fury (2008–09)
- Power Rangers Mystic Force (2006–07)
- Power Rangers Ninja Storm (2003–04)
- Power Rangers Operation Overdrive (2007–08)
- Power Rangers RPM (2009)
- Power Rangers SPD (2005–06)
- Power Rangers Wild Force (2002–03)
- The Proud Family (2002–2006; reruns of Disney Channel series)
- The Puppy's Further Adventures (1982–1984)
- The Real Ghostbusters (1986–1992)
- ReBoot (1994–1995)
- Recess (1997–2004)
- The Reluctant Dragon & Mr. Toad Show (1970–1971)
- The Replacements (2006–2011; reruns of Disney Channel series)
- Richie Rich (1980–1984)
- The Road Runner Show (1971–1973; repeats of the 1966–1968 CBS series)
- Rocky and Bullwinkle (1959–1961; 1964–1973)
- Rubik, the Amazing Cube (1983–1985)
- Sabrina: The Animated Series (1999–2001)
- Science Court (1997–2000)
- Scooby-Doo (all series from The Scooby-Doo/Dynomutt Hour to A Pup Named Scooby-Doo; 1976–1986; 1988–1993)
- Shenanigans (1964–1965)
- Skyhawks (1969–1971)
- The Smokey Bear Show (1969–1971)
- Sonic the Hedgehog (1993–1995)
- Speed Buggy (1975,1976; reruns of the 1973 CBS series)
- Spider-Man (1967–1970)
- Spider-Woman (1979–1980)
- Squigglevision (1998–1999)
- Star Wars: Droids (1985–1986)
- Star Wars: Ewoks (1985–1987)
- Star Wars Rebels (2014)
- The Suite Life of Zack & Cody (2005–2011; reruns of Disney Channel series)
- Super Friends (1973–1986)
- Tales From the Cryptkeeper (1993–1995)
- Teacher's Pet (2000–2002)
- Teamo Supremo (2002–2003)
- Tennessee Tuxedo and His Tales (1964–1966; repeats of the 1963–1964 CBS series)
- That's So Raven (2003–2011; reruns of Disney Channel series)
- These Are the Days (1974–1976)
- Thundarr the Barbarian (1980–1982)
- The Tom and Jerry Show (1975–1977)
- Top Cat (1962–1963; repeats of the 1961–1962 primetime series)
- Turbo Teen (1984–1985)
- Uncle Croc's Block (1975–1976)
- The Weekenders (2000–2002)
- What-a-Mess (1995–1996)
- Wild West C.O.W.-Boys of Moo Mesa (1992–1994)
- Will the Real Jerry Lewis Please Sit Down? (1970–1972)
- W.I.T.C.H. (2005; reruns of 2004–2006 Toon Disney series)
- The Wizard of Oz (1990–1991)
- Wolf Rock TV (1984)
- The Wuzzles (1986–1988; repeats of the 1985–1986 CBS series)
- Yogi's Gang (1973–1975)

=== Interstitial series ===
- ABC Funfit (1985–1986)
- America's Funniest Kids (1992–1995)
- The Bod Squad (1975–1991)
- Computer Critters (1984–1990)
- Dear Alex and Annie (1978–1981)
- Dough Nuts (1980–1983)
- From Me to You (1983–1984)
- The Fun Fact with Yakov Smirnoff (1988–1990)
- H.E.L.P. (1979–1983)
- Joking Around with the Little Clowns (1987–1990)
- Manny the Uncanny
- The Monkey Boys
- Menudo on ABC (1983–1985)
- Nutrition Series (1980–1993)
- O.G. Readmore (1983–1990)
- One to One (1988–1991)
- Posse Philosophy (1990–1992)
- Schoolhouse Rock! (1973–1985, 1992–2000)
- Time for Timer (1975–1992)
- Toy Story Treats (1996–1997)
- Willie Survive (1982–1983)
- Zack of All Trades (1984–1990, 1994)

=== Saturday morning preview specials ===
- 1972 – Preview Special (hosted by The Brady Kids from The Brady Bunch)
- 1973 – Sneak Peek (hosted by Avery Schreiber and Jack Burns)
- 1974 – Funshine Saturday (hosted by Lee Majors from The Six Million Dollar Man)
- 1975 – Funshine Saturday (hosted by Jim Nabors and Ruth Buzzi from The Lost Saucer)
- 1976 – Sneak Peek (hosted by Jimmy Osmond; featuring Chris Kirby, Dick Clark, Kaptain Kool and the Kongs, Marty Allen and The Osmonds)
- 1977 – All-Star Saturday (hosted by Kaptain Kool and the Kongs; featuring Lennie Weinrib, Meadowlark Lemon, Robert Hegyes, Shaun Cassidy and The Krofftettes)
- 1978 – All-Star Saturday (hosted by Jimmy McNichol and Kristy McNichol; featuring Adam Rich, Danielle Spencer, Donny Most, Donny Osmond, Haywood Nelson, Joey Travolta and Maurice Gibb)
- 1982 – Pac Preview Party (hosted by Dick Clark)
- 1983 – (hosted by Dick Clark)
- 1984 – Preview Park (hosted by "Weird Al" Yankovic, featuring Wolfman Jack, Scooby-Doo and Scrappy-Doo)
- 1985 – Saturday Sneak Peek & Fun Fit Test (hosted by Tony Danza; featuring Mary Lou Retton and the droids of Star Wars)
- 1988 – (hosted by the cast of Mr. Belvedere)
- 1989 – Perfectly Strange Saturday Morning Preview (hosted by the cast of Perfect Strangers)
- 1990 – (hosted by Roseanne Barr and cast of Family Matters)
- 1991 – (hosted by the cast of Family Matters)
- 1992 – (hosted by the cast of Step by Step)
- 1993 – (hosted by the cast of Hangin' with Mr. Cooper)
- 1994 – Whole New Level of Fun (hosted by the cast of Boy Meets World)
- 1995 – Saturday Morning Jam (hosted by Gary Owens, Marquise Wilson, Raven-Symoné and Zachery Ty Bryan)
- 1996 – Preview Party (hosted by Melissa Joan Hart; featuring Ian Ziering and the casts of Bone Chillers and Flash Forward)
- 1997 – One Saturday Morning (hosted by Charlie, played by Jessica Prunell)
- 1998 – One Saturday Morning on Friday Night (hosted by Meme, played by Valarie Rae Miller and Salem from ABC's Sabrina, the Teenage Witch)
- 1999 – One Saturday Morning on Friday Night (hosted by Meme, played by Valarie Rae Miller)

== See also ==
- Children's programming on CBS
- Children's programming on NBC
- Lists of United States network television schedules – includes articles on Saturday morning children's programming schedules among the major networks
