= History of ABC =

History of ABC may refer to:

- History of the American Broadcasting Company
- History of the Australian Broadcasting Corporation
