= History of the American Broadcasting Company =

ABC logo since 2021

The American Broadcasting Company (ABC) is an American English-language commercial broadcast television and radio network owned by the Walt Disney Company through its subsidiary, Disney Entertainment. Along with NBC and CBS, ABC is one of the traditional "Big Three" American television networks.

ABC was founded as a radio network in 1943 as the successor to the NBC Blue Network. It extended its operations to television in 1948, following in the footsteps of established broadcast networks CBS, NBC, and the lesser-known DuMont. In the mid-1950s, ABC merged with United Paramount Theatres (UPT), a chain of movie theaters that formerly operated as a subsidiary of Paramount Pictures. In the 1980s, after purchasing an 80 percent interest in cable sports channel ESPN, the network's corporate parent, American Broadcasting Companies, Inc., merged with Capital Cities Communications, owner of several print publications, television, and radio stations. Most of Capital Cities/ABC's assets were purchased by Disney in 1996.

== Blue Network (1927–1945) ==
In the 1930s, radio in the United States was dominated by three companies: the Columbia Broadcasting System (CBS), the Mutual Broadcasting System, and the National Broadcasting Company (NBC). The last was owned by electronics manufacturer Radio Corporation of America (RCA), which owned two radio networks that each ran different varieties of programming, NBC Blue and NBC Red. The NBC Blue Network was created in 1927 for the primary purpose of testing new programs on markets of lesser importance than those served by NBC Red, which served the major cities, and to test drama series.

In 1934, Mutual filed a complaint with the Federal Communications Commission (FCC) regarding its difficulties in establishing new stations in a radio market that was already being saturated by NBC and CBS. In 1938, the FCC began a series of investigations into the practices of radio networks and published its Report on Chain Broadcasting in 1941. This report recommended that RCA give up control of either NBC Red or NBC Blue. At that time, the NBC Red Network was the principal radio network in the United States and, according to the FCC, RCA was using NBC Blue to eliminate any hint of competition. Having no power over the networks themselves, the FCC established a regulation forbidding licenses to be issued for radio stations if they were affiliated with a network which already owned multiple networks that provided content of public interest.

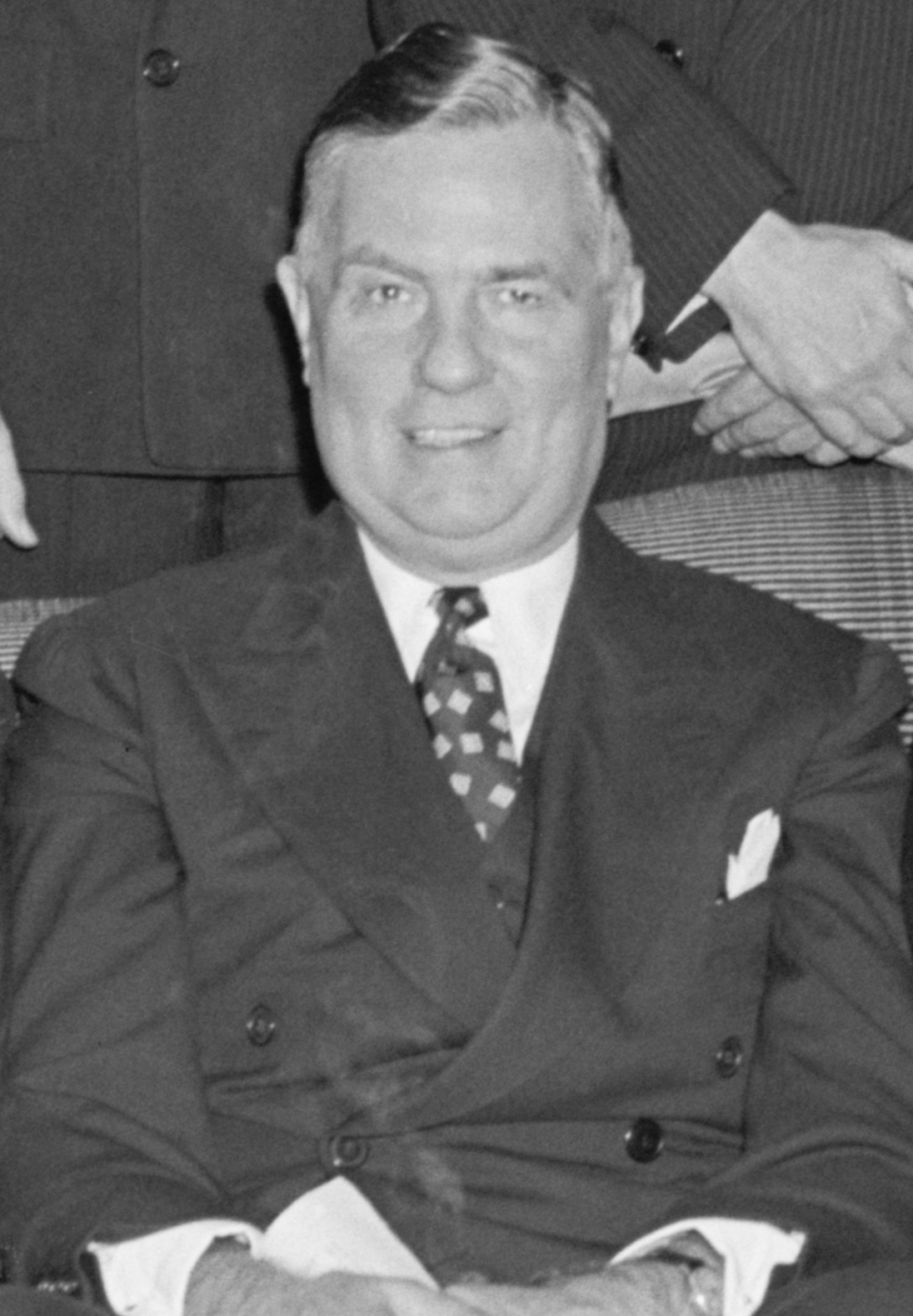
Edward J. Noble, founder of ABC

Once Mutual's appeals against the FCC were rejected, RCA decided to sell NBC Blue in 1941, and gave the mandate to do so to Mark Woods. RCA converted the NBC Blue Network into an independent subsidiary, formally divorcing the operations of NBC Red and NBC Blue on January 8, 1942, with the Blue Network being referred to on-air as either "Blue" or "Blue Network". The newly separated NBC Red and NBC Blue divided their respective corporate assets. Between 1942 and 1943, Woods offered to sell the entire NBC Blue Network, a package that included leases on landlines, three pending television licenses (WJZ-TV in New York City, KGO-TV in San Francisco, and WENR-TV in Chicago), 60 affiliates, four operations facilities (in New York City, Chicago, Los Angeles, and Washington, D.C.), contracts with actors, and the brand associated with the Blue Network. Investment firm Dillon, Read & Co. offered $7.5 million to purchase the network, but the offer was rejected by Woods and RCA president David Sarnoff.

Edward J. Noble, owner of Life Savers candy, drugstore chain Rexall, and New York City radio station WMCA, purchased the network for $8 million. According to FCC ownership rules, the transaction, which was to include the purchase of three RCA stations by Noble, would require him to resell WMCA with the FCC's approval. The Commission authorized the transaction on October 12, 1943. Soon afterward, the Blue Network was purchased by the new company Noble founded, the American Broadcasting System. Noble subsequently acquired the rights to the American Broadcasting Company name from George B. Storer in 1944. Additional broadcasting rights to the American name, including from the moribund American Network, were obtained at the cost of $10,000. The parent company adopted the corporate name American Broadcasting Companies, Inc. Woods retained his position as president and CEO of ABC until December 1949, and was subsequently promoted to vice chairman of the board before leaving ABC altogether on June 30, 1951.

Meanwhile, in August 1944, the West Coast division of the Blue Network, which owned San Francisco radio station KGO, bought Los Angeles station KECA from Earle C. Anthony for $800,000. Both stations were then managed by Don Searle, the vice-president of the Blue Network's West Coast division.

== Entry into television (1945–1949) ==
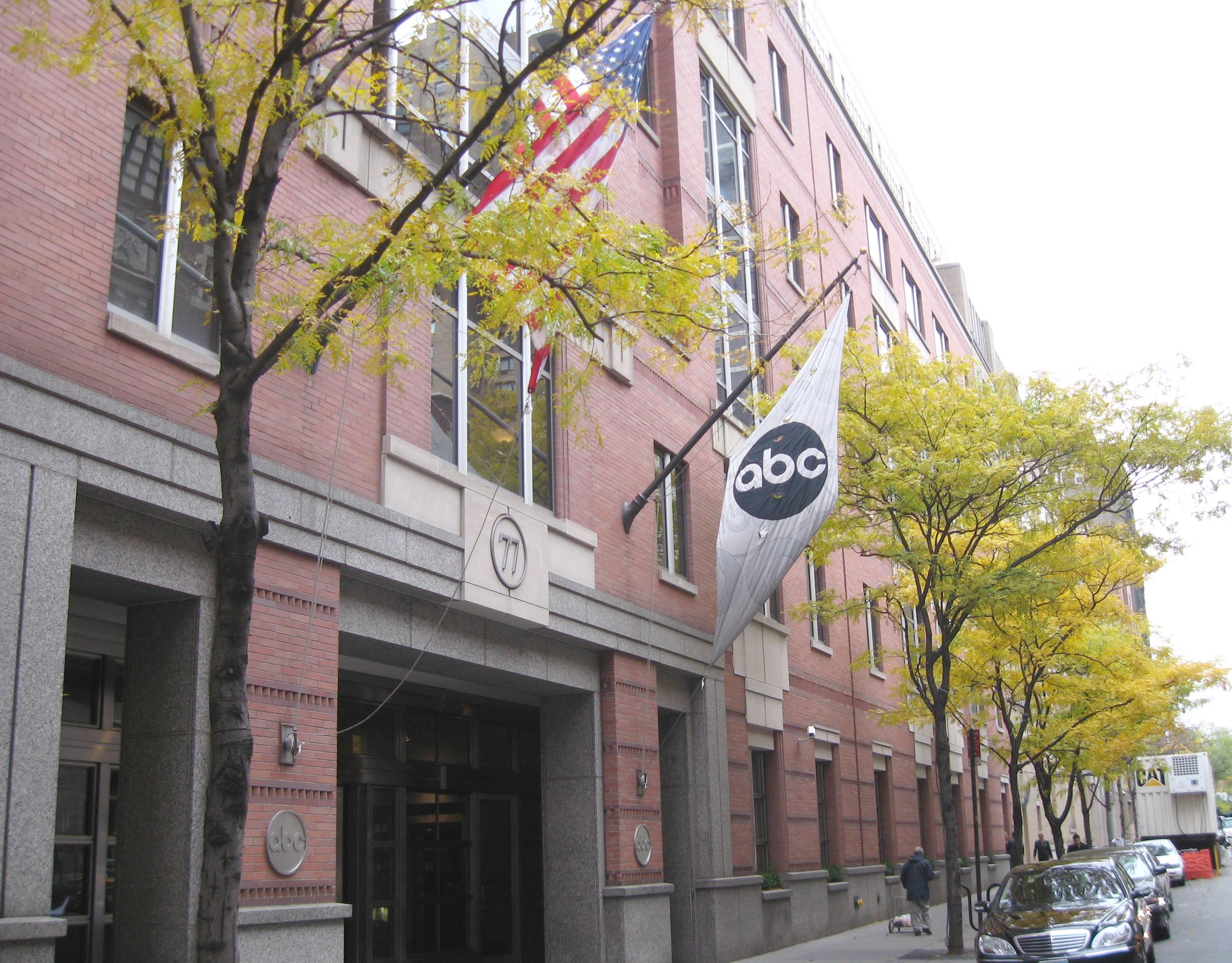
ABC's corporate headquarters formerly at 77 West 66th Street, on the Upper West Side of Manhattan in New York City. The company's business and broadcast operations have moved to 7 Hudson Square in Lower Manhattan.

The ABC Radio Network created its audience slowly. In 1946 it acquired Detroit radio station WXYZ from King-Trendle Broadcasting for a little less than $3 million (the station remained under ABC ownership until 1984).

ABC became an aggressive competitor to NBC and CBS while continuing NBC Blue's traditions of public service. It aired symphony performances conducted by Paul Whiteman, performances from the Metropolitan Opera, and jazz concerts aired as part of its broadcast of The Chamber Music Society of Lower Basin Street announced by Milton Cross. The network also became known for such suspenseful dramas as Sherlock Holmes, Gang Busters and Counterspy, as well as several mid-afternoon youth-oriented programs. However, ABC made a name for itself by using the practice of counterprogramming, with which it often placed shows of its own against the offerings of NBC and CBS, pre-recording its programming with the use of the Magnetophon tape recorder, technology acquired by the United States from post-WWII Germany. With the help of the Magnetophon, ABC was able to provide its stars with greater freedom in terms of time, and also attract several big names, such as Bing Crosby, at a time when NBC and CBS did not allow pre-taped shows.

While its radio network was undergoing reconstruction, ABC found it difficult to avoid falling behind in the new medium of television. To ensure itself a place, ABC submitted five applications for television station licenses in 1947, one for each market where it owned and operated a radio station (New York City, Los Angeles, Chicago, San Francisco, and Detroit). These applications all requested for the stations to broadcast on VHF channel 7, as Frank Marx, then ABC's vice-president of engineering, thought that the low-band VHF frequencies (corresponding to channels 2 through 6) would be requisitioned from broadcasting use and reallocated for the U.S. Army.

The ABC television network was launched on April 19, 1948, and picked up its first primary affiliate, WFIL-TV in Philadelphia, which would later become WPVI-TV. The first program ever broadcast on the network was On the Corner, featuring satirist Henry Morgan. Other stations carrying the original broadcast were WMAR-TV in Baltimore, WMAL-TV in Washington, D.C., and WABD, the DuMont station in New York City, since ABC's New York station had yet to sign on.

The network's flagship owned-and-operated station, WJZ-TV in New York City, signed on the air on August 10, 1948, with its first broadcast running for two hours that evening. ABC's other owned-and-operated stations launched over the course of the next 13 months: WENR-TV in Chicago signed on the air on September 17, while WXYZ-TV in Detroit went on the air on October 9, 1948. In October 1948, as a result of an influx of television station license applications that it had issued as well as a study it undertook on the use of the VHF spectrum for broadcasting purposes, the FCC implemented a freeze on new station applications. However, KGO-TV in San Francisco, which had received its license prior to the freeze, made its debut on May 5, 1949. On May 7, 1949, Billboard revealed that ABC had proposed an investment of $6.25 million, of which it would spend $2.5 million to convert 20 acres (80,937 m^{2}) of land in Hollywood into what would become The Prospect Studios, and construct a transmitter on Mount Wilson, in anticipation of the launch of KECA-TV, which began operations on September 16.

In the fall of 1949, ABC found itself in the position of an outsider, with less coverage than CBS and NBC, even though it was on par with them in some major cities and had a headstart over its third rival at the time, the DuMont Television Network. On November 3, 1949, The Ruggles starring Charlie Ruggles debuted, becoming the first family sitcom on the ABC network.

Before the freeze ended in 1952, there were only 108 television stations in the United States; a few major cities (such as Boston) had only two television stations, many other cities (such as Pittsburgh and St. Louis) had only one, and still many others (such as Denver and Portland) did not yet have television service. The result was an uneven transition period where television flourished in certain areas and network radio remained the sole source of broadcast entertainment and news in others.

== American Broadcasting-Paramount Theatres ==
At the end of 1949, movie theater operator United Paramount Theatres (UPT) was forced by the U.S. Supreme Court to become an independent entity, separating itself from Paramount Pictures. For its part, ABC was on the verge of bankruptcy, with only five owned-and-operated stations and nine full-time affiliates. Its revenues, which were related to advertising and were indexed compared to the number of listeners/viewers, failed to compensate for its heavy investments in purchasing and building stations. In 1951, a rumor spread that the network would be sold to CBS. In 1951, Noble held a 58% ownership stake in ABC, giving him $5 million with which to prevent ABC from going bankrupt; as banks refused further credit, that amount was obtained through a loan from the Prudential Insurance Company of America.

Leonard Goldenson, the president of UPT (which sought to diversify itself at the time), approached Noble in 1951 on a proposal for UPT to purchase ABC. Noble received other offers, including one from CBS founder William S. Paley; however, a merger with CBS would have forced that network to sell its New York City and Los Angeles stations at the very least. Goldenson and Noble reached a tentative agreement in the late spring of 1951 in which UPT would acquire ABC and turn it into a subsidiary of the company that would retain autonomy in its management. On June 6, 1951, the tentative agreement was approved by UPT's board of directors. However, the transaction had to be approved by the FCC because of the presence of television networks and the recent separation between Paramount and UPT. Insofar as Paramount Pictures was already a shareholder in the DuMont Television Network, the FCC conducted a series of hearings to ensure whether Paramount was truly separated from United Paramount Theatres and whether it was violating antitrust laws.

In 1952, when the release of the FCC's Sixth Report and Order announced the end of its freeze on new station license applications, among the issues the commission was slated to address was whether to approve the UPT-ABC merger. One FCC Commissioner saw the possibility of ABC, funded by UPT, becoming a viable and competitive third television network. On February 9, 1953, the FCC approved UPT's purchase of ABC in exchange for $25 million in shares. The merged company, renamed American Broadcasting-Paramount Theatres, Inc. and headquartered in the Paramount Building at 1501 Broadway in Manhattan, owned six AM and several FM radio stations, five television stations and 644 cinemas in 300 U.S. cities. To comply with FCC ownership restrictions in effect at the time that barred common ownership of two television stations in the same market, UPT sold its Chicago television station, WBKB-TV, to CBS (which subsequently changed the station's call letters to WBBM-TV) for $6 million, while it kept ABC's existing Chicago station, WENR-TV. The merged company acquired the WBKB call letters for channel 7, which would eventually become WLS-TV. Goldenson began to sell some of the older theaters to help finance the new television network.

On March 1, 1953, ABC's New York City flagship stations – WJZ, WJZ-FM and WJZ-TV – changed their respective callsigns to WABC, WABC-FM and WABC-TV, and moved their operations to facilities at 7 West 66th Street, one block away from Central Park. The WABC call letters were previously used by the flagship station of CBS Radio (now WCBS) until 1946. The WJZ calls would later be reassigned to the then-ABC affiliate in Baltimore in 1957, in a historical nod to the fact that WJZ was originally established by the Baltimore station's owner at the time, Westinghouse.

However, a problem emerged regarding the directions taken by ABC and UPT. In 1950, Noble appointed Robert Kintner to be ABC's president while he himself served as its CEO, a position he held until his death in 1958. Despite the promise of non-interference between ABC and UPT, Goldenson had to intervene in ABC's decisions because of financial problems and the FCC's long period of indecision. Goldenson added to the confusion when, in October 1954, he proposed a merger between UPT and the DuMont Television Network, which was also mired in financial trouble. As part of this merger, the network would have been renamed "ABC-DuMont" for five years, and DuMont would have received $5 million in cash, room on the schedule for existing DuMont programming, and guaranteed advertising time for DuMont Laboratories receivers. In addition, to comply with FCC ownership restrictions, it would have been required to sell either WABC-TV or DuMont owned-and-operated station WABD in the New York City market, as well as two other stations. The merged ABC-DuMont would have had the resources to compete with CBS and NBC.

Goldenson sought to develop the ABC television network by trying to convince local stations to agree to affiliate with the network. In doing this, he contacted local entrepreneurs who owned television stations themselves, many of whom had previously invested in Paramount cinemas and had worked with him when he undertook the responsibility of restructuring UPT.

=== Hollywood begins to produce television series ===
At the same time he made attempts to help grow ABC, Goldenson had been trying since mid-1953 to provide content for the network by contacting his old acquaintances in Hollywood, with whom he had worked when UPT was a subsidiary of Paramount Pictures. ABC's merger with UPT thus led to the creation of relationships with Hollywood's film production studios, bridging the gap that had existed at that time between film and television, the latter of which had previously been more connected to radio. ABC's flagship productions at the time were The Lone Ranger, based on the radio program of the same title, and The Adventures of Ozzie and Harriet, which held the record for the longest-running prime time comedy in U.S. television until 2003.

Goldenson's efforts paid off, and on October 27, 1954, the network launched a campaign ushering in the "New ABC", with productions from several studios, including Metro-Goldwyn-Mayer (MGM), Warner Bros., and 20th Century Fox.

Warner tried with mixed success to adapt some of its most successful films as ABC television series, and showcase these adaptations as part of the wheel series Warner Bros. Presents, which aired during the 1955–56 season. It showcased television adaptations of the 1942 films Kings Row and Casablanca; Cheyenne (adapted from the 1947 film Wyoming Kid); Sugarfoot (a remake of the 1954 film The Boy from Oklahoma); and Maverick. However, the most iconic of ABC's relationships with Hollywood producers was its agreement with Walt Disney; after the start of the network's bond with the Disney studio, James Lewis Baughman, who worked as a columnist at that time, observed that "at ABC's headquarters in New York, the secretaries [were now] wearing hats with Mickey Mouse ears".

=== First bonds with Disney ===
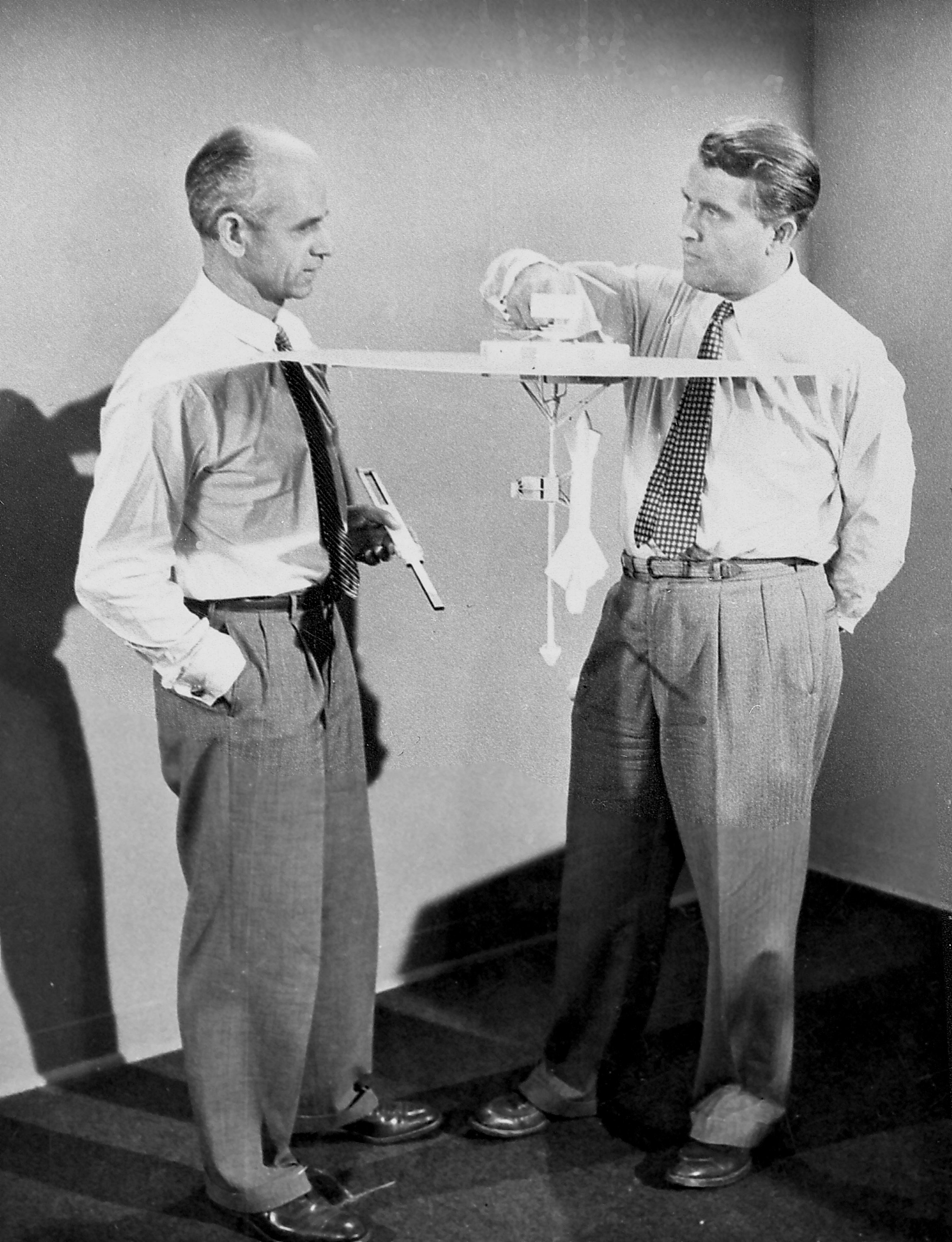
Ernst Stuhlinger (left) and Wernher von Braun in the episode "Mars and Beyond" (1957) from Disneyland, the first of many Walt Disney anthology television series.

Walt Disney and his brother Roy contacted Goldenson at the end of 1953 for ABC to agree to finance part of the Disneyland project in exchange for producing a television program for the network. Walt wanted ABC to invest $500,000 and accrued a guarantee of $4.5 million in additional loans, a third of the budget intended for the park. Around 1954, ABC agreed to finance Disneyland in exchange for the right to broadcast a new Wednesday night program, Disneyland, which debuted on the network on October 27, 1954 as the first of many anthology television programs that Disney would broadcast on all three networks over the course of the next 50 years.

When Disneyland opened on July 17, 1955, ABC aired a special live broadcast commemorating the park's first day of operation, Dateline: Disneyland. Shortly thereafter, on October 3, 1955, a second regularly scheduled program produced by Disney made its debut, The Mickey Mouse Club, a children's program that aired Monday through Friday afternoons, which starred a group of 24 children known as the "Mouseketeers". The two Disney programs made 1955 the year that ABC was first profitable as a network and station owner.

=== Affiliate issues ===
By 1954, all U.S. networks had regained control of their programming, with higher advertising revenues: ABC's revenue increased by 67% (earning $26 million), NBC's went up by 30% ($100 million) and CBS's rose by 44% ($117 million). However that year, ABC had only 14 primary affiliates compared to the 74 that carried the majority of CBS programs and the 71 that were primarily affiliated with NBC. Most markets outside the largest ones were not large enough to support three full-time network affiliates. In some markets that were large enough for a third full-time affiliate, the only available commercial allocation was on the less-desirable UHF band. Until the All-Channel Receiver Act (passed by Congress in 1961) mandated the inclusion of UHF tuning, most viewers needed to purchase a converter to be able to watch UHF stations and the signal quality was marginal at best. Additionally, during the analog television era, UHF stations were not adequately receivable in markets that either covered large areas or had rugged terrain. These factors made many prospective station owners skittish about investing in a UHF station, especially one that would have had to take on an affiliation with a weaker network.

As a result, with the exception of the largest markets, ABC was relegated to secondary status on one or both of the existing stations, usually via off-hours clearances. (Note: A notable exception during this time was WKST-TV in Youngstown, Ohio, now WYTV, despite the small size of the surrounding market and its close proximity to Cleveland and Pittsburgh even decades before the city's economic collapse) According to Goldenson, this meant that an hour of ABC programming reported five times lower viewership than its competitors. The network's intake of money at the time allowed it to accelerate its content production, but ABC's limited reach continued to hobble it for the next two decades. Several smaller markets did grow large enough to support a full-time ABC affiliate until the 1960s, with some very small markets having to wait as late as the 1980s or the advent of digital television in the 2000s (which allowed stations like WTRF-TV in Wheeling, West Virginia, to begin airing ABC programming on a digital subchannel after relegating the network to off-hours clearances decades before).

The DuMont Television Network ceased broadcasting on September 15, 1955, and went bankrupt the next year. ABC then found itself as the third U.S. television network, dubbed the "little third network". That same year, Kintner was forced to resign due to disagreements between Noble and Goldenson, a consequence of Goldenson's many interventions in ABC's management.

=== Counterprogramming ===
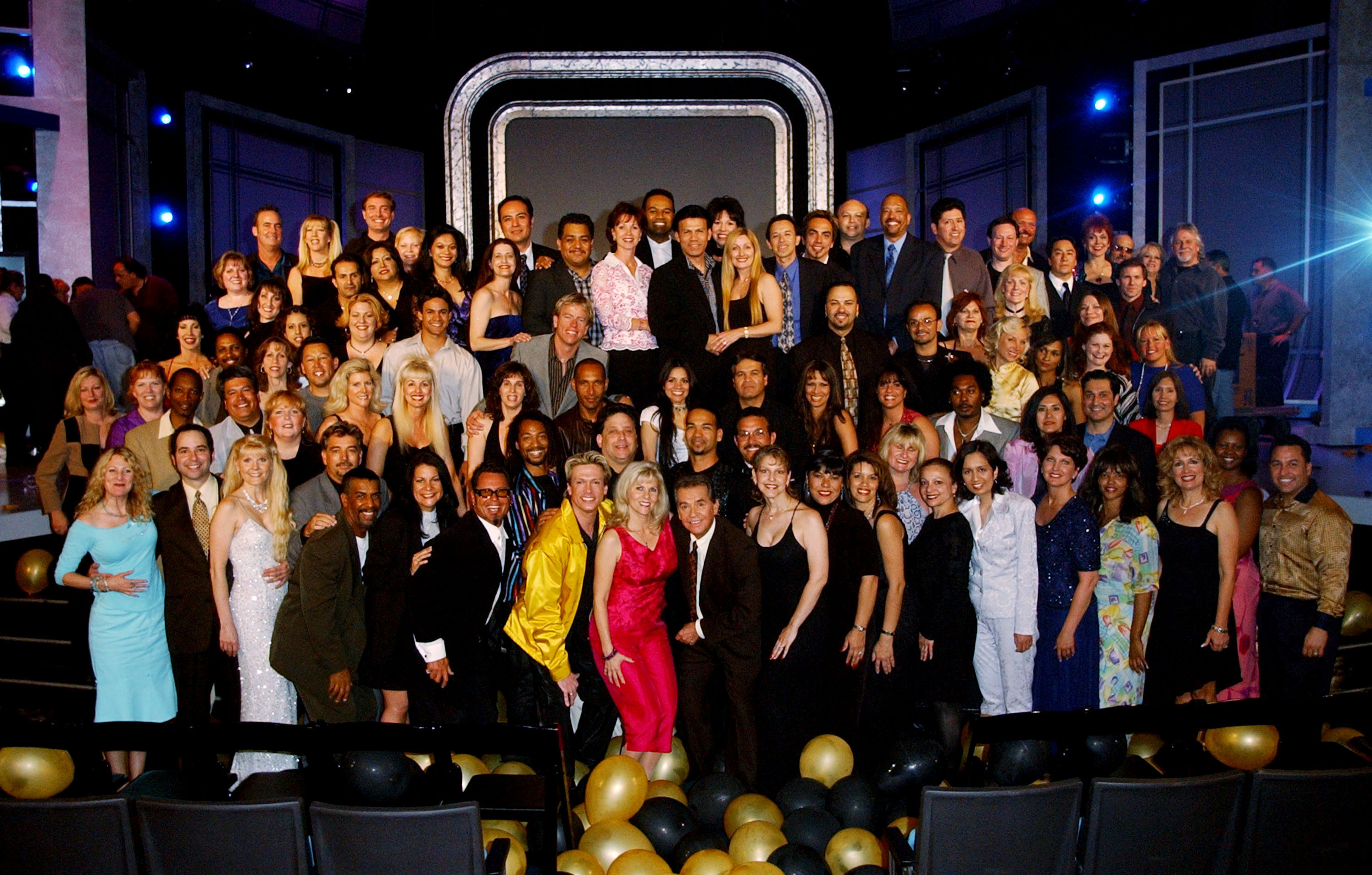
In 2002, dancers and other cast members from the 32-year run of American Bandstand reunited with host Dick Clark to celebrate the 50th anniversary of the show's local television debut.

In the late 1950s the ABC network became a serious contender to NBC and CBS, in large part due to the diverse range of programming that met the expectations of the public, such as westerns and detective series. Despite an almost 500% increase in advertising revenues between 1953 and 1958, the network only reached between 10% and 18% of the U.S. population. In 1957, ABC Entertainment president Oliver Treyz discovered that the locally produced variety show Bandstand had pulled very strong ratings in the Philadelphia market on WFIL-TV; Treyz ultimately negotiated a deal to take the show national, under the revised title American Bandstand; the show quickly became a social phenomenon by presenting new musical talent and dances to America's youth and helped make a star out of its host, Dick Clark.

On September 3, 1958, the Disneyland anthology series was retitled Walt Disney Presents as it became disassociated with the theme park of the same name. The popularity of westerns, which ABC is credited for having started, represented a fifth of all primetime series on U.S. television in January 1959, at which point detective shows were beginning to rise in popularity as well. ABC requested additional productions from Disney. ABC picked up the Desilu Productions detective series The Untouchables (after it was rejected by CBS in late 1958) and debuted it in April 1959. The series quickly become "immensely popular" despite its violent action.

These kinds of programs presented ABC as having a "philosophy of counterprogramming against its competitors", offering a strong lineup of programs that contrasted with those seen on its rival networks, which helped Goldenson create a continuum of programming which bridged film and television. ABC's western series (as well as series such as the actioner Zorro) went up against and defeated the variety shows aired by NBC and CBS in the fall of 1957, and its detective shows did the same in the fall of 1959. To captivate audiences, short 66-minute series were scheduled a half-hour before their hour-long competition. In May 1961, Life criticized the public enthusiasm and sponsorship for these types of shows at the expense of news programming and denounced an unofficial policy "replacing the good programs with the bad ones".

== Transition to color (1960s) ==
During the 1960s, ABC continued its strategies from the mid-1950s by consolidating the network as part of its effort to gain loyalty from the public. The network's finances improved and allowed it to invest in other properties and programming. In May 1960, ABC purchased Farm Progress, owner of Chicago radio station WLS, which had shared airtime with WENR since the 1920s. This acquisition allowed ABC to consolidate its presence in the market. On May 9, 1960, WLS launched a new lineup consisting of ABC Radio programming. Farm Progress also owned farm newspapers such as Prairie Farmer.

In 1960, Canadian entrepreneur John W. H. Bassett, who was trying to establish a television station in Toronto, Ontario, sought aid from ABC. Goldenson agreed to acquire a 25% interest in CFTO-TV; however, legislation by the Canadian Radio-Television Commission (CRTC) prohibited ABC's involvement, resulting in the company withdrawing from the project before the station's launch.

=== Children's programming and the launch of ABC Sports (1960–1965) ===
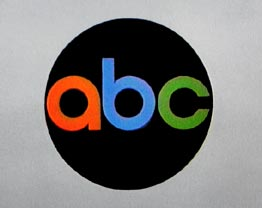
The "ABC Circle" logo, designed by Paul Rand, was introduced in a 1962 identification card.

ABC programming of the 1960s was marked by the rise of family-oriented series in an attempt to counterprogram against its established competitors. The decade was also marked by the network's gradual transition to color and the addition of sports programming.

In 1959, Walt Disney Productions, having improved its financial situation, purchased ABC's shares in the Disneyland theme park for $7.5 million and initiated discussions to renew ABC's television contract for Walt Disney Presents, which was due to expire in 1961. Walt Disney was approached by NBC to produce color broadcasts of his anthology series (which would be renamed Walt Disney's Wonderful World of Color). Goldenson said ABC could not counter the offer, because the network did not have the technical and financial resources to carry the program in the format. As a result, ABC and Disney's first television collaboration ended in 1961. (Note: ABC resumed its relationship with Disney in 1985, when the anthology series returned to the network for a three-season run as the Disney Sunday Movie until it lost the rights to NBC again in 1988; the Disney anthology series would return to ABC in 1996, following the company's purchase of the future Capital Cities/ABC, as The Wonderful World of Disney.)

On September 30, 1960, ABC premiered The Flintstones; although the animated series from William Hanna and Joseph Barbera was filmed in color from the beginning, it was initially broadcast in black and white, as ABC had not made the necessary technical upgrades to broadcast its programming in color at the time. The Flintstones allowed ABC to present a novelty – prime-time animated programming – while filling the hole left by the conclusion of the Disney partnership with family-oriented programming from other producers. Other animated series included Calvin and the Colonel, Matty's Funday Funnies, Top Cat and The Bugs Bunny Show, the latter of which showcased classic Looney Tunes and Merrie Melodies shorts.

In search of new programs for a competitive edge, ABC's management believed that sports could be a major catalyst in improving the network's market share. On April 29, 1961, ABC launched Wide World of Sports, an anthology series created by Edgar Scherick through his company Sports Programs, Inc. and produced by a young Roone Arledge. The series featured a different sporting event each broadcast. ABC purchased Sports Programs, Inc. in exchange for shares in the company, leading it to become the future core of ABC Sports, with Arledge as the executive producer of that division's shows.

Due to pressure from film studios which wished to increase their production, the major networks began airing theatrically released films. ABC launched the ABC Sunday Night Movie in 1962, a year behind similar programs on CBS and NBC and initially in black-and-white. Despite an increase in viewership share to 33% (from 15% in 1953), ABC remained in third place by revenues; the company had total revenue of $15.5 million, a third of that pulled in by CBS for the same period. To catch up, ABC ordered another animated series from Hanna-Barbera, The Jetsons, which debuted on September 23, 1962, as the network's first color series. On April 1, 1963, ABC premiered the soap opera General Hospital, which later became the network's longest-running entertainment program. That year also saw the premiere of The Fugitive, a hit drama series starring David Janssen, centering on a man on the run after being falsely accused of murder.

The 1964–65 season was marked by the debuts of several classic series including Bewitched (on September 17) and The Addams Family (on September 18). Arledge's success with acquiring prime sports content was confirmed in 1964 when he was appointed vice-president of ABC Sports.

=== New regulations and the radio network's recovery (1966–1969) ===
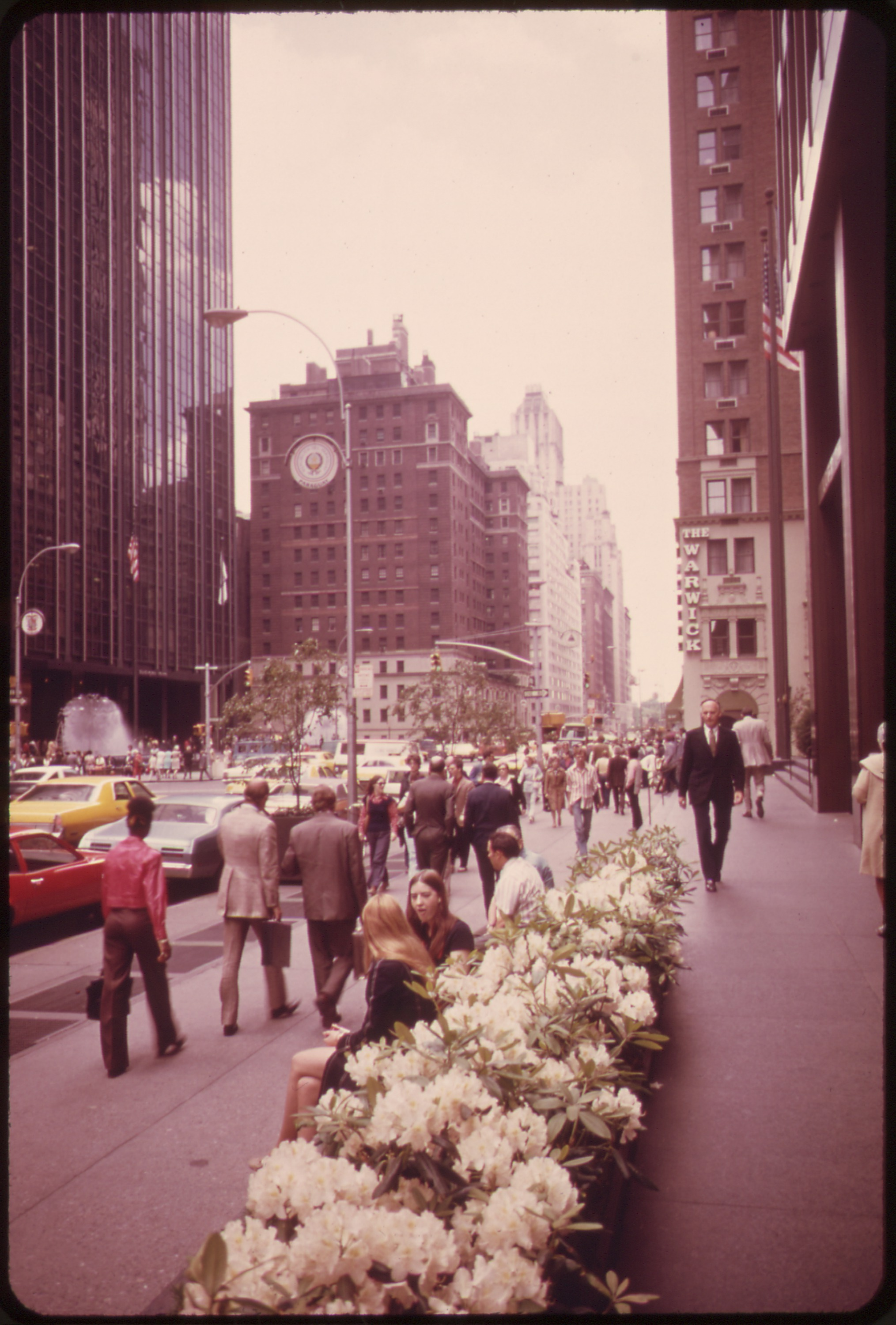
During this period, ABC moved its corporate headquarters to 1330 Avenue of the Americas.

Color became the dominant format for the Big Three networks in the 1965–66 U.S. network television season. ABC remained in third place and required investment to grow into a major competitor, but faced financing issues. In 1964, the network found itself, as Goldenson later wrote in the 1991 book Beating the Odds: The Untold Story Behind the Rise of ABC, "in the middle of a war [where] the battlefield was Wall Street". Many companies sought to take over ABC, including Norton Simon, General Electric, Gulf and Western Industries, International Telephone and Telegraph, and Litton Industries.

In 1965, the corporate entity, American Broadcasting-Paramount Theatres, was renamed as the American Broadcasting Companies, while its cinema division became ABC Theatres; its recording division was renamed ABC Records in 1966. In December of that year, the ABC television network premiered The Dating Game, a pioneer series in its genre, which was a reworking of the blind date concept in which a suitor selected one of three contestants sight-unseen based on the answers to selected questions. This was followed in July 1966 by The Newlywed Game, featuring four recently married couples who guessed the responses to their partner's questions (some of which were fairly risque). As ABC began to outgrow its facilities at 7 West 66th Street, Goldenson found a new headquarters for ABC in a 44-story building located at 1330 Avenue of the Americas in Manhattan, at the corner of 54th Street (now occupied by The Financial Times's New York office). This operation allowed for the conversion of the premises at 66th Street into production facilities for television and radio programs.

On December 7, 1965, Goldenson announced a merger proposal with ITT to ABC management; the two companies agreed to the deal on April 27, 1966. The FCC approved the merger on December 21, 1966; however, the previous day (December 20), Donald F. Turner, head antitrust regulator for the United States Department of Justice, expressed doubts related to such issues as the emerging cable television market, and concerns over the journalistic integrity of ABC and how it could be influenced by the overseas ownership of ITT. ITT management promised that the company would allow ABC to retain autonomy in the publishing business. The merger was suspended, and a complaint was filed by the Department of Justice in July 1967, with ITT going to trial in October; the merger was officially canceled after the trial's conclusion on January 1, 1968.

On January 12, 1966, ABC replaced The Adventures of Ozzie and Harriet with Batman, an action series based on the DC Comics series starring Adam West that was known for its kitschy style. In 1967, WLS radio CEO Ralph Beaudin was appointed as the president of ABC Radio. Under his leadership, ABC Radio was divided into four "networks" devoted to different types of programming: news, informative series, pop music, and talk shows. Two other networks were later created to provide rock music and traffic reporting.

In 1968, ABC took advantage of new FCC ownership regulations that allowed broadcasting companies to own a maximum of seven radio stations nationwide to purchase Houston radio stations KXYZ and KXYZ-FM for $1 million in shares and $1.5 million in bonds. That year, Roone Arledge was named president of ABC Sports; the company also founded ABC Pictures, a film production company which released its first picture that year, the Ralph Nelson-directed Charly. It was renamed ABC Motion Pictures in 1979; the unit was dissolved in 1985. The studio also operated two subsidiaries, Palomar Pictures International and Selmur Pictures. In July 1968, ABC continued its acquisitions in the amusement parks sector with the opening of ABC Marine World in Redwood City, California; that park was sold in 1972 and demolished in 1986, with the land that occupied the park later becoming home to the headquarters of Oracle Corporation.

In July 1968, ABC Radio launched a special programming project for its FM stations called "LOVE Radio". It was spearheaded by Allen Shaw, a former program manager at WCFL in Chicago, to compete with the emerging progressive rock and DJ-helmed stations. The new concept featured a limited selection of music genres and was launched on ABC's seven owned-and-operated FM stations in late November 1968; It replaced nearly all of the programming provided by these stations; however, several affiliates (such as KXYZ) retained the majority of their content. In August 1970, Shaw announced that ABC FM's music choice policy should be reviewed to allow listeners access to many styles of music.

On the television side, in September 1969, ABC launched the Movie of the Week, a weekly showcase aimed at capitalizing on the growing success of made-for-TV movies since the early 1960s. The Movie of the Week broadcast feature-length dramatic films with directors including Aaron Spelling, David Wolper and Steven Spielberg and produced on an average budget of $400,000–$450,000. Successes of the showcase include Duel, which was popular enough to follow with a theatrical release, and A Matter of Humanities, which became the basis for Marcus Welby, M.D., ABC's first show to reach No. 1 in the Nielsen ratings. Other hits for the television network during the late 1960s and early 1970s included the comedies The Courtship of Eddie's Father, The Brady Bunch, The Partridge Family, That Girl, Room 222, and The Mod Squad.

== Success in television (1971–1980) ==
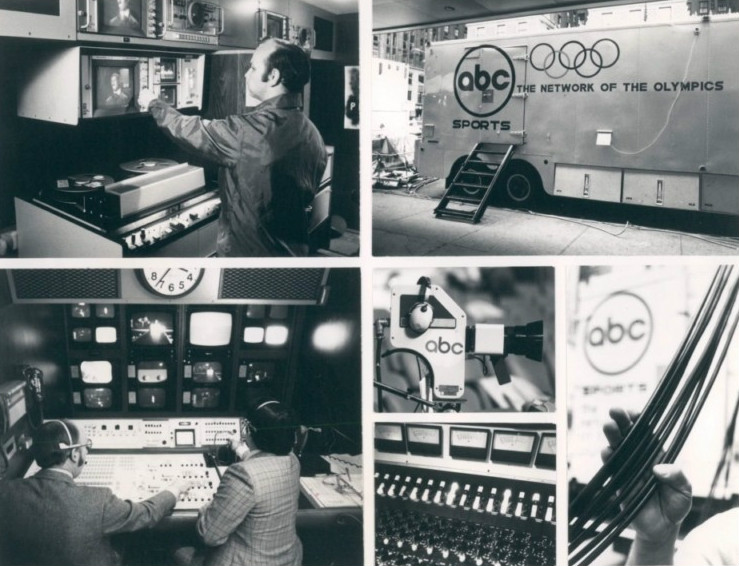
Publicity photo of the mobile studios used by ABC in 1976.

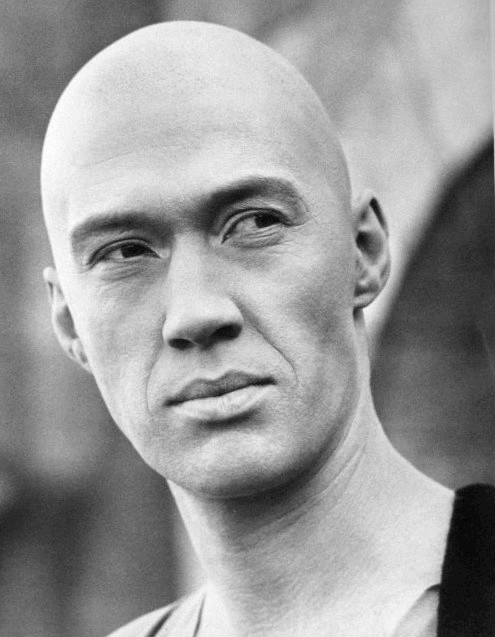
David Carradine, star of Kung Fu.

In the early 1970s, ABC completed its transition to color. The decade as a whole marked a turning point for ABC, which passed CBS and NBC in the ratings to become the first place network. It also began to use behavioral and demographic data to match advertising sponsors with programming, and to develop programming which appealed to specific audiences. ABC's gains in audience share were greatly helped by the fact that several smaller markets had grown large enough to support full-time affiliates from all three networks.

In 1970, ABC debuted Monday Night Football (MNF) as part of its Monday primetime schedule; the program became a hit for the network and served as the National Football League's (NFL's) premier game of the week until 2006, when Sunday Night Football on NBC took over that position in a broadcast deal which moved MNF to ESPN. According to Goldenson, Monday Night Football helped ABC regularly achieve an audience share of 15%–16%; ABC Sports managed the budget for the Monday night time slot to reallocate the weekly budget for ABC's prime time schedule to just six days, as opposed to seven on competing networks. 1970 also saw the premieres of several soap operas including All My Children, which ran on the network for 41 years.

In 1970, the FCC passed the Financial Interest and Syndication Rules, a set of regulations aimed at preventing the major networks from monopolizing the broadcast landscape by barring them from owning any of the prime time programming that they broadcast. In 1972, the new rules resulted in the company's decision to split ABC Films into two separate companies: the existing Worldvision Enterprises, which would produce and distribute programming for U.S. syndication, and ABC Circle Films as a production unit. Worldvision was sold to a consortium of ABC executives for nearly $10 million.

Congress passed the Public Health Cigarette Smoking Act which banned cigarette advertising from all television and radio networks, effective January 2, 1971. Citing limited profitability of its cinemas, ABC Great States, the Central West division of ABC Theatres, was sold to Henry G. Plitt in 1974. On January 17, 1972, Elton Rule was named president and chief operating officer of ABC a few months after Goldenson reduced his role in the company after suffering a heart attack.

In the early 1970s, Michael Eisner, who joined ABC in 1966, became the network's program development manager. He helped bring about ideas for many series including Happy Days (which originated as a segment on the anthology series Love, American Style) and several soap operas. Eisner's main credit at ABC was for developing youth-oriented programming. He was responsible for reacquiring the rights to the Looney Tunes-Merrie Melodies library (which had spent several years on CBS) as well as developing Jackson 5ive animated series and a series about the Osmonds, and greenlighting Super Friends (which was based on DC Comics' Justice League of America series). He also laid ground-work for the development of educational children's programming (predating the 1990 Children's Television Act) through interstitials such as Time for Timer, The Bod Squad and Schoolhouse Rock!. Eisner left ABC in 1976 to become president of Paramount Pictures; he later become the chairman of Disney.

In the spring of 1975, Fred Silverman became the first president and director of programming of ABC Entertainment, the independent television production subsidiary created from the network's namesake programming division. In 1974, ABC premiered the police series S.W.A.T.. That same year, the network decided to compete with NBC's morning news-talk program Today. Its first attempt was AM America; however, that show's success was not straightforward. Boston affiliate WCVB-TV produced morning show Good Day! (initially premiering as Good Morning! in 1973) which was groundbreaking for being entirely produced and broadcast from road locations, while Cleveland affiliate WEWS-TV was producing The Morning Exchange since 1972 and which in summer 1975 was locally pre-empting AM America; this was the first-morning show to use a set modeled after a living room and provided news and weather updates at the top and bottom of each hour. Discovering that these formats appealed to viewers, the network adopted them for a new national morning show, Good Morning America, which debuted on November 3, 1975. In 1975, ABC launched the short-lived late night comedy show "Saturday Night Live with Howard Cosell". The show was not a tremendous success and was cancelled shortly afterward. After the program's cancellation, NBC purchased the rights to the title and rechristened its own comedy sketch show from NBC's Saturday Night to Saturday Night Live.

The 1970s were highlighted by several successful comedy, fantasy, action and superhero-themed series for the network including Kung Fu, The Six Million Dollar Man, Wonder Woman, Starsky & Hutch, What's Happening!!, Charlie's Angels, The Bionic Woman, Fantasy Island, and Battlestar Galactica. Many of these series were greenlit by Silverman, who left ABC in 1978 to become president of NBC's entertainment division. The rousing success of Happy Days also led to a successful spin-off series, Laverne & Shirley, which debuted during the 1975–76 season. Charlie's Angels and Three's Company (which debuted during the 1976–77 season) were two prime examples of a trend among the major networks during the 1970s known as "jiggle TV", featuring attractive, often buxom, women in main and guest roles.

In 1977, Henry Plitt, who at the time was associated with Chicago real estate entrepreneur Thomas Klutznick, purchased the southern division of ABC Theatres, ABC Southern. The sale stripped ABC of control over its theaters as a result of changes in the theater operation sector, mainly the fact that the population was migrating to the suburbs and moving away from older cinemas in larger cities. (Plitt Theatres was later purchased by Cineplex Odeon Corporation in 1987.)

For its part, the television network produced a few new hits during 1977. January saw the premiere of miniseries Roots, one of the highest-rated programs in U.S. television, with unprecedented ratings for its finale. Comedy-drama anthology series The Love Boat, though critically lambasted, became a ratings success and lasted nine seasons. The success of Roots, Happy Days, and The Love Boat allowed the network to achieve first place in the ratings for the first time in the 1976–77 season. On September 13, 1977, the network debuted Soap, a controversial adult parody of daytime soap opera dramas, which became known for being the first U.S. network television series to feature an openly gay main character (played by a then-unknown Billy Crystal); set to debut in September 1977, Soap had TV watchdogs threatening to wash out the network's proverbial mouth. Network censors also took issue with the show’s content, leading to frequent producer battles. A leaked internal report, famously known as "the Soap memo,” was reprinted in its entirety in the Los Angeles Times on June 27, nearly three months before the series' premiere. Propelled by the erroneous report about its content, talk of the new show bubbled up early and led to protests and boycott threats that made it front-page news from June to September. The series last ran on the network on April 20, 1981.

Meanwhile, ABC News, which formed as a separate division, sought to become a global leader in television news. In 1977, Roone Arledge was named president of ABC News in addition to ABC Sports. That same year, ABC launched a major expansion of its office facilities in New York City. The company first constructed a 10-story building on the corner of Columbus Avenue and West 66th Street, nicknamed "7 Lincoln Square" (although it is actually located at 149 Columbus Avenue). Meanwhile, a 15-story building was constructed at 30 West 67th Street. Both buildings were completed in June 1979. WABC-TV moved its operations from offices at 77 West 66th Street to 149 Columbus Avenue, freeing up space for the ABC network to house some of its operations.

In June 1978, Arledge created the newsmagazine 20/20 which debuted as a summer series. After its first episode received harshly negative reviews, the program was revamped to feature a mix of in-depth stories and interviews, with anchor Hugh Downs later joined by Barbara Walters. A month later, ABC revamped its evening newscasts rebranding them from ABC Evening News (since their launch in 1970) to World News Tonight. In February 1979, ABC sold its recording division to MCA Records for $20 million; the label was discontinued by March 5 of that year, and all of its 300 employees were laid off (the rights to the works of ABC Records and all of MCA's other labels have since been acquired by Universal Music Group).

ABC entered the publishing business in the 1970s and formed ABC Publishing in 1977. Acquisitions included: magazines Modern Photography and High Fidelity in 1974, Word Inc. in 1976, properties of CHC Corporation (Los Angeles and the National Insurance Law Service) in 1977, and Chilton in 1979.

== Merger with Capital Cities, purchase of ESPN, and reprogramming Friday nights (1981–1990) ==
ABC dominated the American television landscape during the 1970s and early 1980s (by 1980, the three major networks represented 90% of domestic prime-time television viewership). Several flagship series premiered on the network during the early 1980s, such as Dynasty. The network was also propelled during the early 1980s by the continued successes of Happy Days, Three's Company, Laverne & Shirley, and Fantasy Island, and gained new hits in Too Close for Comfort, Soap spinoff Benson, and Happy Days spinoff Mork & Mindy. In 1981, ABC (through its ABC Video Services division) launched the Alpha Repertory Television Service (ARTS), a cable channel operated as a joint venture with the Hearst Corporation offering cultural and arts programming, which aired as a nighttime service over the channel space of Nickelodeon.

ESPN (logo pictured) was acquired by ABC in 1982.

On August 9, 1982, ABC purchased a 10% stake in the Entertainment and Sports Programming Network (ESPN), which had launched in September 1979, for $20 million; in exchange for the interest, ESPN gained the U.S. television rights to the British Open, which ABC had not been able to broadcast in its entirety. The purchase provided ABC the option of purchasing additional shares of up to 49% under certain conditions, which included the option to purchase at least 10% of Getty Oil's shares in the channel prior to January 2, 1984.

In 1983, ABC sold KXYZ to the Infinity Broadcasting Corporation. On January 4, 1984, The New York Times reported that ABC, through its subsidiary ABC Video Enterprises, had exercised its option to purchase up to 15% (or between $25 million and $30 million) of Getty Oil's shares in ESPN, which would allow it to expand its shares at a later date. In June 1984, ABC's executive committee approved the company's interest acquisition in ESPN, and ABC arranged with Getty Oil to obtain an 80% stake in the channel, while selling the remaining 20% to Nabisco. That year, ABC and Hearst reached an agreement with RCA to merge ARTS and competing arts service, The Entertainment Channel, into a single cable channel called Arts & Entertainment Television (A&E); the new channel subsequently leased a separate satellite transponder, ending its sharing agreement with Nickelodeon to become a 24-hour service. Meanwhile, ABC withdrew from the theme park business when it sold the Silver Springs Nature Theme Park.

In December 1984, Thomas S. Murphy, CEO of Capital Cities Communications, contacted Goldenson about a proposal to merge their respective companies. On March 16, 1985, ABC's executive committee accepted the merger offer, which was formally announced on March 18 with Capital Cities purchasing ABC and its related properties for $3.5 billion and $118 for each of ABC's shares as well as a guarantee of 10% (or $3) for a total of $121 per share. The merger shocked the entertainment industry, as Capital Cities was some 4 times smaller than ABC was at the time. To finance the purchase, Capital Cities borrowed $2.1 billion from a consortium of banks, which sold certain assets that Capital Cities could not acquire or retain due to FCC ownership rules for a combined $900 million and sold off several cable television systems to The Washington Post Company (forming the present-day Cable One). The remaining $500 million was loaned by Warren Buffett, who promised that his company Berkshire Hathaway would purchase 3 million shares at $172.50. Due to an FCC ban on same-market ownership of television and radio stations by a single company (although the deal would have otherwise complied with new ownership rules implemented by the FCC in January 1985, that allowed broadcasters to own a maximum of 12 television stations), ABC and Capital Cities respectively decided to sell WXYZ-TV and Tampa independent station WFTS-TV to the E. W. Scripps Company (although Capital Cities/ABC originally intended to seek a cross-ownership waiver to retain WXYZ and Capital Cities-owned radio stations WJR and WHYT); New Haven affiliate WTNH was not part of the deal as that station had significant overlap with WABC-TV. The deal was, at the time, the largest non-oil merger in world business history. This records surpassed later that year by the merger of General Electric and RCA (the latter company then being the parent company of NBC).

The merger between ABC and Capital Cities received federal approval on September 5, 1985. After the merger was finalized on January 3, 1986, combined company Capital Cities/ABC, Inc. added four television stations (WPVI-TV/Philadelphia, KTRK-TV/Houston, KFSN-TV/Fresno, and WTVD/Raleigh) and several radio stations to ABC's broadcasting portfolio, and also included Fairchild Publications and four newspapers (including The Kansas City Star and Fort Worth Star-Telegram). It also initiated several changes in its management: Frederick S. Pierce was named president of ABC's broadcasting division; Michael P. Millardi became vice president of ABC Broadcasting and president of ABC Owned Stations and ABC Video Enterprises; John B. Sias was appointed president of the ABC Television Network; Brandon Stoddard became president of ABC Entertainment' (Note: a position to which he had been appointed in November 1985) and Roone Arledge became president of ABC News and ABC Sports. In February 1986, Thomas S. Murphy, who had been CEO of Capital Cities since 1964, was appointed chairman and CEO emeritus of ABC. Jim Duffy stepped down as ABC Television president for a management position at ABC Communications, a subsidiary that specialized in community service programming, including shows related to literacy education.

Four of ABC's top shows of the 1970s ended their runs during the mid-1980s: Laverne & Shirley in 1983, Happy Days and Three's Company in 1984 (with the latter producing a short-lived spinoff that year), and The Love Boat in 1986. After nearly a decade of ratings trouble, NBC had regained the ratings lead among the Big Three networks in 1984 on the success of series such as The Cosby Show, Cheers, and Miami Vice. In the mid-1980s, to counteract NBC, ABC decided to refocus itself on family-oriented comedies, including: Who's the Boss?, Mr. Belvedere, Growing Pains, Perfect Strangers, Head of the Class, Full House, The Wonder Years, Just the Ten of Us, and Roseanne. After the initial successes of these series, ABC revamped its Friday night schedule in the late 1980s, revolving around family-friendly comedies, culminating in the point where it launched the "TGIF" block (the initialism of which the stars in promotions touted as "Thank Goodness It's Funny") in 1989. Many of the series featured during the run of the block were produced by Miller-Boyett Productions, which briefly programmed the entire Friday lineup during the 1990–91 season. ABC also claimed successes with dramas and action series throughout the mid- and late 1980s, such as Moonlighting, MacGyver, Thirtysomething, and China Beach.

Despite this, several affiliates were disappointed with ABC's largely underperforming programming lineup during the network's decline in the mid-1980s, WSAV-TV in Savannah and KOMU in Columbia, Missouri, owned by News-Press & Gazette Company and University of Missouri, respectively, disaffiliated from ABC in 1985 (with WJCL-TV and KMIZ respectively replacing those stations as ABC affiliates), citing the network's weaker program offerings, which they claimed were hampering viewership of their stronger syndicated slate.

In 1987, ABC Entertainment partnered with Italian broadcaster RAI to develop three made-for-television movies, for $10–12 million each, for roughly the same licensing cost as a standard telefilm at that time, and the network would get first crack at English-language films, which will be released theatrically by RAI overseas, concurrent with their network debuts on ABC, and the two projects were identified as The Primitive and Danger Adrift. In 1988, ABC constructed a new headquarters building near the studios of WABC-TV on West 66th Street. The television network's restructuring program, launched in 1974, helped with the purchases and exchanges of nearly 70 stations during the late 1980s, and aided in increasing its ratings by more than 2 million viewers.

In 1989, ABC sold High Fidelity and Modern Photography to Diamandis Communications, which merged them with other magazines.

== Sale to Disney (1991–2000) ==
In 1990, Daniel B. Burke took over Thomas S. Murphy's position as president, but Murphy remained ABC's chairman and CEO. Capital Cities/ABC reported revenues of $465 million. Now at a strong second place, ABC entered the 1990s with more major successes targeted at families, such as America's Funniest Home Videos (which later became ABC's longest-running prime time entertainment program), Family Matters, Hangin' with Mr. Cooper, Step by Step, Coach, Boy Meets World , Doogie Howser, M.D., Life Goes On, cult favorite Twin Peaks and The Commish. In September 1991, ABC premiered the sitcom Home Improvement starring comic Tim Allen, which lasted eight seasons and led ABC to greenlight additional sitcom projects helmed by comedians, including The Drew Carey Show, Me and the Boys, Grace Under Fire, and Ellen – which became notable for a 1997 episode with the coming out of its star.

In 1992, ABC sold Word Inc. to Thomas Nelson.

In 1993, the FCC repealed the Financial Interest and Syndication Rules, allowing networks to hold interests in television production studios. That same year, Capital Cities/ABC formed a limited partnership with DIC Animation City known as DIC Entertainment LP. It also signed an agreement with Time Warner Cable (TWC) to carry its owned-and-operated television stations on the provider's systems in those markets. By that year, ABC had a total viewership share of 23.63% of American households, just below the limit of 25% imposed by the FCC.

Daniel Burke departed from Capital Cities/ABC in February 1994, with Thomas Murphy taking over as president before ceding control to Robert Iger. September 1993 saw the premiere of NYPD Blue, a gritty police procedural from Steven Bochco; lasting twelve seasons, the drama became known for its boundary pushing of broadcast standards (particularly its occasional use of graphic language and rear nudity), which led some affiliates to initially refuse to air the show's first season.

To compete with CNN, ABC proposed a 24-hour news channel called ABC Cable News, with plans to launch the network in 1995; however, this plan was shelved by company management. ABC returned to the concept in July 2004 with the launch of ABC News Now, a 24-hour news channel distributed for viewing on the Internet and mobile phones.

On August 29, 1994, ABC purchased Flint, Michigan, affiliate WJRT-TV and WTVG in Toledo, Ohio, from SJL Broadcast Management, with the latter switching to ABC once its contract with NBC expired in early 1995. Both stations were acquired as a contingency plan in the event that CBS reached an affiliation deal with WXYZ-TV (to replace WJBK, which switched to Fox as a result of that network's group affiliation agreement with New World Communications) to allow the network to retain some over-the-air presence in the Detroit market (the E. W. Scripps Company and ABC would reach a group affiliation deal that renewed affiliation agreements with WXYZ and WEWS, and switch four other stations, including two whose Fox affiliations were displaced by the New World deal, with the network). Besides Scripps, ABC signed major station agreements with River City Broadcasting, McGraw Hill and Allbritton Communications to switch several stations to ABC.

In May 1995, Capital Cities was interested in selling ABC to multiple companies including Disney and more media companies.

On August 1, 1995, the Walt Disney Company announced its intent to acquire and merge with ABC from Capital Cities for $19 billion. Disney shareholders approved the deal at a special conference in New York City on January 4, 1996, with the acquisition being completed on February 9, 1996; following the sale, Disney formed Disney Enterprises Inc., and renamed its new subsidiary ABC Inc. In addition to the ABC network, the Disney acquisition integrated into the company: ABC's ten owned-and-operated television and 21 radio stations; its 80% interest in ESPN, ownership interests in The History Channel, A&E Television Networks, and Lifetime Entertainment, DIC Productions L.P.; and Capital Cities/ABC's magazine and newspaper properties. Following the acquisition, Thomas S. Murphy departed from ABC while Robert Iger took his position as president and CEO.

Disney sold several ABC divisions after the merger. To comply with FCC ownership rules, Disney sold Los Angeles independent station KCAL-TV to Young Broadcasting for $387 million. Farm Progress was sold to the Australian company Rural Press. NILS was sold to Wolters Kluwer. Also, Disney sold the newspapers that Capital Cities had operated to Knight Ridder.

Around the time of the merger, Disney's television production units had already produced series for ABC such as Home Improvement, Sister, Sister and Boy Meets World, while the deal also allowed ABC access to Disney's children's programming library for its Saturday morning block. In 1998, ABC premiered the Aaron Sorkin-created sitcom Sports Night, centering on the travails of the staff of a SportsCenter-style sports news program; despite earning critical praise, the series was cancelled after two seasons.

On May 10, 1999, Disney reorganized its publishing division, the Buena Vista Publishing Group, renaming it as Disney Publishing Worldwide; this became a subsidiary of Disney Consumer Products while Hyperion Books became affiliated with ABC. On July 8, 1999, Disney consolidated Walt Disney Television Studio, Buena Vista Television Productions, and ABC's primetime division into the ABC Entertainment Television Group. In 1998, ABC moved its primary offices to Burbank in the Disney studio lot.

In August 1999, ABC premiered a special series event, Who Wants to Be a Millionaire?, based on the British game show of the same title. Hosted throughout its ABC tenure by Regis Philbin, the program became a major ratings success and was renewed as a regular series. At its peak, the program aired as frequently as six nights a week. Buoyed by Millionaire, during the 1999–2000 season, ABC became the first network to move from third to first place in the ratings during a single television season. Millionaire ended its run on ABC's primetime lineup after three years. In September 2002, Buena Vista Television relaunched the show as a syndicated program; that version's first and longest-serving host, Meredith Vieira, became the first woman to win multiple Emmy Awards for hosting a game show. Millionaire ended its original run in 2019 after 20 seasons.

In 2000, Disney sold Los Angeles to Emmis Communications.

On September 14, 2023, in response to the potential sale of ABC to Nexstar Media Group, the Walt Disney Company issued the following statement saying "While we are open to considering a variety of strategic options for our linear businesses, at this time the Walt Disney Company has made no decision with respect to the divestiture of ABC or any other property and any report to that effect is unfounded.”

== New century, new programs; divisional restructuring (2001–2009) ==
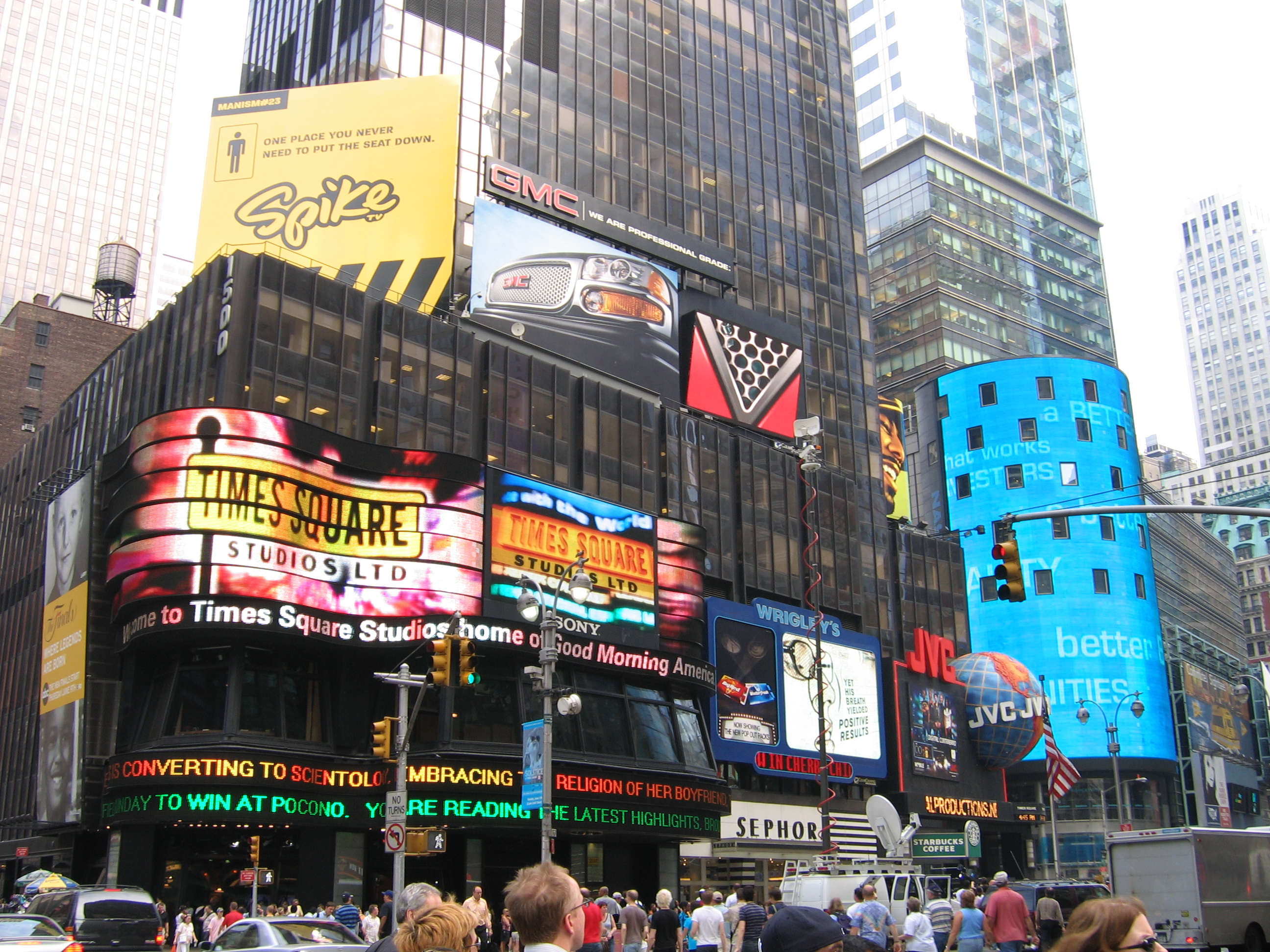
ABC's Times Square Studios in New York City in 2005.

In addition to Who Wants to Be a Millionaire, ABC entered the 2000s with hits held over from the previous decade such as The Practice, NYPD Blue and The Wonderful World of Disney and new series such as My Wife and Kids starring Damon Wayans and Tisha Campbell and According to Jim starring Jim Belushi, which managed to help ABC stay ahead of the competition in the ratings. 2000 saw the end of the original "TGIF", which could not find new hits following the loss of Family Matters and Step by Step to CBS, and the loss of Sabrina the Teenage Witch to The WB. Outside of 20/20, Friday nights remained a weak spot for ABC for the next 11 years.

On April 30, 2000, as a result of a carriage dispute with ABC, Time Warner Cable removed ABC owned-and-operated stations from the cable provider's systems in four markets (WABC-TV in New York City, KABC-TV in Los Angeles, KTRK in Houston and WTVD in Raleigh-Durham). ABC had earlier reached an eleventh-hour deal to renew its agreement with the provider on December 31, 1999. ABC filed an emergency petition to the FCC on May 1 to force TWC to restore the affected stations; the FCC ruled in favor of ABC, ordering TWC to restore the stations, doing so on the afternoon of May 2. ABC ended the 2000–01 season as the most-watched network, ahead of NBC.

In the 2001–02 television season, ABC began airing the drama series Alias and comedies According to Jim and George Lopez, as well as ABC's first hit reality series, The Bachelor, which spawned a number of spinoffs. Later that season marked the end of the original run of Who Wants to Be a Millionaire, which moved to syndication for the 2002–03 season. The ending of Millionaire and the failure of The Wayne Brady Show, along with the cancellations of Dharma & Greg, Spin City, and Once and Again, contributed to ABC's decline from second to third place between the 2000–01 and the 2002–03 seasons.

In October 2002, Disney chairman/CEO Michael Eisner outlined a proposed realignment of the ABC broadcast network with its cable channel counterparts: ABC Saturday mornings with Disney Channels (Toon and Playhouse), ABC daytime with Soapnet and ABC prime time with ABC Family.

Following the 2003–04 season (which coincided with the end of The Practice after eight seasons), ABC's average viewership declined by ten ratings points, landing ABC in fourth place, behind NBC, CBS, and Fox (by the following year, the combined season-ending average audience share of ABC, NBC and CBS represented only 32% of U.S. households). However, during the 2004–05 season, ABC experienced unexpected success with new series such as Desperate Housewives, Lost and Grey's Anatomy as well as reality series Dancing with the Stars. These helped ABC rise to second place behind Fox. On April 21, 2004, Disney announced a restructuring of its Disney Media Networks division with Marvin Jacobs being named president of ABC parent Disney–ABC Television Group, and ESPN president George Bodenheimer becoming co-CEO of the division with Jacobs, as well as president of ABC Sports. On December 7, 2005, ABC Sports and ESPN signed an eight-year broadcast-rights agreement with NASCAR, allowing ABC and ESPN to broadcast 17 NASCAR Cup Series races each season (comprising just over half of the 36 races held annually).

=== Separation of the radio network ===
Between May and September 2005, rumors circulated that Disney–ABC was considering a sale of ABC Radio, with Clear Channel Communications and Westwood One (which had earlier purchased NBC's radio division) as potential buyers. On October 19, 2005, ABC announced the restructuring of the group into six divisions: Entertainment Communications, Communications Resources, Kids Communications, News Communications, Corporate Communications, and International Communications.

On February 6, 2007, the Walt Disney Company announced an agreement with Citadel Broadcasting to merge the ABC Radio Network with Citadel. The new entity, Citadel Communications, was majority owned (52%) by Disney, in conjunction with Forstmann Little (32%) and former shareholders of Citadel Broadcasting (16%). Citadel eventually merged with Cumulus Media in September 2011.

==== Entertainment reorganization and WGA strike (2007–2009) ====
In February 2007, Disney announced that it would rename its Touchstone Television production unit as the ABC Television Studio (simplified to ABC Studios by that summer), as part of its groupwide initiative to drop secondary production brands such as Buena Vista. In May 2007, ABC unveiled a new image campaign, revolving around the slogan "Start Here", which highlighted the multi-platform availability of ABC's program content.

The Writers Guild of America strike halted production of network programs for much of the 2007–08 season and affected network programming into 2009, as various ABC shows that premiered in 2007, such as Dirty Sexy Money, Pushing Daisies, Eli Stone and Samantha Who?, did not continue to a third season; other series such as Boston Legal and the U.S. version of Life on Mars suffered from low viewership. One of the network's strike-replacement programs during that time was the game show Duel, which premiered in December 2007 and became a minor success in its initial six-episode run, but failed to recapture its audience as a regular series in April 2008. On August 15, 2008, Disney denied rumors that it would be selling the ten ABC owned-and-operated stations.

In early 2009, Disney–ABC Television Group merged ABC Entertainment and ABC Studios into a new division, ABC Entertainment Group, to oversee both production and broadcasting operations. During this reorganization, the group announced that it would cut 5% of its workforce. On April 2, 2009, Citadel Communications announced that it would rebrand ABC Radio as Citadel Media; however, ABC News continued to provide news content for Citadel. On December 22, Disney–ABC Television Group announced a partnership with Apple Inc. to make individual episodes of ABC and Disney Channel programs available for purchase on iTunes.

== Current state (2010–present) ==
In March 2010, reports suggested that the Walt Disney Company was considering spinning off ABC into an independent company because "it [did not] add a lot of value to Disney's other divisions". Disney entered advanced negotiations with two private equity firms to sell ABC; however, the planned sale was cancelled as a result of an FBI investigation into allegations of attempted insider trading by an ex-employee which they later denied.

ABC had declining ratings by 2010. That year, the final season of Lost became the drama's lowest-rated season since its debut in 2004. Ratings for the once-hit Ugly Betty collapsed dramatically after it was moved to Fridays in the fall of 2009; an attempt to recapture ratings by moving the dramedy to Wednesdays failed, with its ultimate cancellation by ABC eliciting negative reaction from the public and the show's fanbase. ABC's remaining top veteran shows Desperate Housewives and Grey's Anatomy, and former hit drama Brothers & Sisters, all ended the 2009–10 season having recorded their lowest ratings.

Among the few bright spots during this season were the midseason crime dramedy Castle and two family sitcoms that anchored ABC's revamped Wednesday comedy lineup, The Middle and Modern Family, the latter of which was both a critical and commercial success. Shark Tank (based on the Dragon's Den reality format) became a midseason sleeper hit in the spring of 2010; the following season, it became the tentpole of the network's Friday night schedule, paired with 20/20 and the later addition of sitcom Last Man Standing to gradually help make ABC a strong competitor against CBS's Friday drama-reality lineup.

ABC's troubles with sustaining existing series and gaining new hits spilled over into its 2010–11 schedule: ABC's dramas during that season continued to fail, with the midseason forensic investigation drama Body of Proof being the only new drama renewed for a second season. ABC also struggled to establish new comedies to support the previous year's debuts, with only late-season premiere Happy Endings earning a second season. Meanwhile, the new lows hit by Brothers & Sisters led to its cancellation, and the previous year's only drama renewal, V, also failed to earn another season after a low-rated midseason run. Despite this and another noticeable ratings declines, ABC increased its third-place ratings lead over NBC from the previous year.

With relatively little buzz surrounding its 2010–11 pilots, compounded by a sexual harassment lawsuit against him, Stephen McPherson resigned as ABC Entertainment Group president in July 2010. Paul Lee (who previously served as the president of sister cable channel ABC Family) was announced as his replacement.

On November 3, 2010, Broadcasting & Cable magazine announced that SJL Broadcasting, now owned by the principal owners of Lilly Broadcasting, made an agreement with Disney to buy back WJRT and WTVG, the two smallest stations in ABC's O&O portfolio. Both stations would retain their affiliations with ABC. SJL teamed up with a new private equity partner, Bain Capital, whose affiliated offshoot Sankaty Advisors provided the capital for the purchases (which amounted to $13.2 million and $16.8 million on WJRT and WTVG's end of the $30 million deal, respectively). The sale was completed on April 1, 2011.

On April 14, 2011, ABC canceled the long-running soap operas All My Children and One Life to Live after 41 and 43 years on the air, respectively. (Note: Following backlash from fans, ABC sold the rights to both shows to Prospect Park, which revived the soaps on Hulu for one additional season in 2013 and with both companies suing one another for allegations of interference with the process of reviving the shows, failure to pay licensing fees and issues over ABC's use of certain characters from One Life to Live on General Hospital during the transition.) The talk-lifestyle show that replaced One Life to Live, The Revolution, failed to generate satisfactory ratings and was canceled after seven months. The 2011–12 season saw ABC drop to fourth place in the 18–49 demographic despite renewing a handful of new shows, including dramas Scandal, Revenge and Once Upon a Time.

In 2012, ABC News and Univision Communications announced a partnership to launch an English-language cable news channel primarily aimed at younger English-speaking Hispanics; the new network, Fusion, launched on October 28, 2013. The 2012–13 season failed to live up to the previous year, with only one drama, Nashville, and one comedy, The Neighbors, earning a second season renewal.

The 2013–14 season was a slight improvement for ABC with three new hits in The Goldbergs, Agents of S.H.I.E.L.D. and Resurrection. NBC, which had lagged behind ABC for eight years, finished the season in first place in the 18–49 demographic for the first time since 2004, and in second place in total viewership behind long-dominant CBS. ABC finished the season in third place while Fox fell to fourth in both demographics.

The 2014–15 season saw moderate hits in Black-ish (the first series on the four major U.S. networks to feature a predominantly African-American cast since 2006) and major successes in How to Get Away with Murder – which, alongside Grey's Anatomy and Scandal, comprised a new Thursday drama lineup executive produced by Shonda Rhimes. Other notable new shows were comedy Fresh Off the Boat, drama Secrets and Lies and low-rated but critically acclaimed American Crime, all of which were renewed.

The 2015–16 season saw breakout hits such as Quantico, The Real O'Neals, The Catch, and Dr. Ken. After eight seasons, Castle was cancelled following an announcement that one of its stars would not return. With the success of Celebrity Family Feud as a summer series in 2015, ABC started a summer game show block on Sundays, ABC Fun and Games, consisting of Family Feud, $100,000 Pyramid and Match Game.

The 2016–17 season saw a successful expansion of the network's Tuesday night comedy line-up by an extra hour, with long-time Wednesday staple The Middle leading the night, along with the returning Fresh Off the Boat and The Real O'Neals, and new series American Housewife, Imaginary Mary, and Downward Dog. Wednesday's comedy block, led by The Goldbergs, introduced Speechless. Both American Housewife and Speechless were renewed for second seasons. This season also saw the cancellation of long-running sitcom Last Man Standing and Dr. Ken. The former cancellation stirred controversy due to allegations that it was due to the show and star's right-leaning viewpoints. ABC also saw the success of freshman series Designated Survivor, while ratings declined for the previous season's breakout hit Quantico.

The 2017–18 season saw ABC acquire a breakout hit with The Good Doctor. ABC revived former Fox series American Idol for the mid-season. As a result, veteran dramas Once Upon a Time and Marvel Agents of S.H.I.E.L.D. were displaced to Friday nights, while Shark Tank was moved to Sunday nights. This season also saw veteran series The Middle, Once Upon a Time, and Scandal conclude their runs. ABC revived Roseanne (which had originally run from 1988 to 1997) for a successful tenth season. However, the series' eleventh season was abruptly cancelled due to a scandal involving its star Roseanne Barr, and was retooled without her character as The Conners.

A major reshuffle in executive leadership also occurred after Disney announced its acquisition of 21st Century Fox. On November 16, 2018, Freeform President Karey Burke succeeded Channing Dungey as head of ABC Entertainment. It was also announced that former head of 20th Century Fox Television Dana Walden had been appointed to take over as head of ABC, Freeform, and all other Disney television-studio operations. Former Fox executive Peter Rice was assigned to manage non-sports television programming for ABC and other Disney networks.

In addition to The Conners, the 2018–19 season saw ABC premiere the drama series The Rookie and A Million Little Things, as well as the comedies Schooled and Single Parents; all four of those series would be renewed for additional seasons, but the latter two would be canceled following the 2019–20 season. The 2018–19 season also saw the expansion of the network's summer game show block as Press Your Luck, Card Sharks, and Holey Moley premiered, with all three shows being renewed for additional seasons.

In the 2019–20 season, ABC began showing the comedy series Mixed-ish (a spin off of Black-ish) and the drama series Stumptown and For Life; the 2019–20 season served as the final season for Fresh Off the Boat, How to Get Away with Murder, Agents of S.H.I.E.L.D., and Modern Family, all of which had been airing for at least six seasons. Shortly after the February 2020 sweeps period, production of most of ABC's programming was temporarily suspended as a result of the COVID-19 pandemic; as a result, Stumptown (which was initially renewed for a second season) was canceled after a single season due to production delays.

In a July 2023 interview with CNBC amid the 2023 Hollywood labor disputes, Disney CEO Bob Iger stated that the company was reconsidering its ownership of linear television properties (aside from ESPN), citing that "the creativity and content they create is core to Disney, but the distribution model, the business model that forms the underpinning of that business, and that has delivered great profits over the years, is definitely broken." In September 2023, Nexstar Media Group senior advisor Tom Carter stated that the company could acquire ABC's portfolio of owned-and-operated stations, stating that "we're in eight of the top 10 markets already with a CW station. We could buy a second station in that market and not increase our household footprint. There may be a few stations that would require divestiture of either a Nexstar station or an ABC station, but we could onboard those with relatively little friction." In response to the statement, Disney denied that it had made any decisions on divesting its properties, and was keeping strategic options open. However, it was reported that on September 15, 2023, Byron Allen had made an unsolicited offer to acquire ABC and its owned-and-operated stations, FX, and National Geographic for $10 billion. On November 29, 2023, Iger announced that Disney was no longer interested in a potential sale of any linear television assets-including ABC-effectively rejecting Nexstar and Bryon Allen's respective offers.

In the 2023–24 broadcast season, Shrek the Halls, an animated holiday special which has aired on ABC during the Christmas season since 2007, would move to NBC on November 30, 2023, as a result of NBCUniversal's acquisition of DreamWorks Animation in 2016, while the television series 9-1-1 moved from Fox to ABC for its seventh season on March 14, 2024, while ABC Signature was folded to 20th Television on October 1, 2024; ABC has produced 20th Television shows since October 1, 2024.

On September 17, 2025, ABC pulled late-night host and comedian Jimmy Kimmel’s Jimmy Kimmel Live! off the air indefinitely over comments he made in reference the assassination of Charlie Kirk. Earlier that week, Kimmel had spent a portion of his opening monologue complaining that "the MAGA gang" was "desperately trying to characterize this kid who murdered Charlie Kirk as anything other than one of them, and doing everything they can to score political points from it". The late-night host went on to discuss the phenomenon of flags being flown at half-mast in honor of Kirk, which got some criticism at the time, and mocked US President Donald Trump's reaction to the shooting. Kimmel condemned the attack and sent "love" to his family on the day of Kirk’s killing. A spokesperson for the network shared the show "will be pre-empted indefinitely". This occurred after the FCC chair openly threatened to revoke the licenses of ABC affiliates earlier that day if Kimmel was not suspended or canceled.

== Bibliography ==
- Barnouw, Erik (1968). The Golden Web: A History of Broadcasting in the United States, 1933 to 1953. New York: Oxford University Press. ISBN 978-0-7351-0258-3.
- Baughman, James Lewis Baughman, James Lewis (1983). "ABC and the Destruction of American Television, 1953-1961". In Atack, Jeremy (ed.). Business and Economic History: Second Series. Vol. 12. pp. 57–73. Archived from the original on July 31, 2013.( at archive.org)
- Boddy, William (1992). Fifties Television: The Industry and Its Critics. University of Illinois Press.
- Bronson, Fred (2003). Billboard's hottest hot 100 hits. Billboard Books. ISBN 0-8230-7738-1.
- Brown, Les (1977). The New York Times Encyclopedia of Television. Times Books. ISBN 0-8129-0721-3.
- Castleman, Walter J.; Podrazik, Harry (1982). Watching TV: Four Decades of American Television. McGraw-Hill. ISBN 0-07-010269-4.
- Childers, Scott (2008). Chicago's WLS Radio. Arcadia Publishing. ISBN 978-0-7385-6194-3.
- Cotter, Bill (1997). The Wonderful World of Disney Television: A Complete History. Hyperion Books. ISBN 0-7868-6359-5.
- Cox, Jim (2009). American Radio Networks: A History. McFarland. ISBN 978-0-7864-4192-1.
- Croteau, D.; Hoynes, W. (2006). The Business of Media: Corporate Media and the Public Interest. Thousand Oaks, California: Pine Forge Press.
- Ford, Luke (2004). The Producers: Profiles in Frustration. iUniverse. ISBN 0-595-32016-3.
- Freeman, Michael (2002). ESPN: The Uncensored History. New York: Taylor Trade Publishing. ISBN 0-87833-270-7.
- Goldenson, Leonard H.; Wolf, Marvin J. (1991–1993). Beating the Odds: The Untold Story Behind the Rise of ABC. New York City: Charles Scribner's Sons. ISBN 0-684-19055-9.
- Grant, Tina (1988). International Directory of Company Histories. Vol. 48. St. James Press. ISBN 1-55862-466-X.
- Hagstrom, Robert G. (1994–1997). The Warren Buffett Way: Investment Strategies of the World's Greatest Investor. John Wiley & Sons. ISBN 0-471-17750-4.
- Holt, Alisa; Perren, Jennifer (2009). Media Industries: History, Theory, and Method. Wiley-Blackwell. ISBN 978-1-4051-6342-2.
- Howard, Herbert H. (1979). Multiple Ownership in Television Broadcasting: Historical Development and Selected Case Studies. New York: Ayer Publishing. ISBN 0-405-11759-0.
- Hyatt, Wesley (2012). Television's Top 100. McFarland. ISBN 978-0-7864-4891-3. Archived from the original on March 26, 2011.
- Kahn, Ashley (2006). The House That Trane Built: The Story of Impulse Records. London: Granta Books.
- Karol, Michael (January 11, 2008). The ABC Movie of the Week Companion: A Loving Tribute to the Classic Series. iUniverse. ISBN 978-1-60528-023-3.
- Kiska, Tim (2009). A Newscast for the Masses: The History of Detroit Television News. Wayne State University Press. ISBN 978-0-8143-3302-0.
- Lasar, Matthew (2000). Pacifica Radio: The Rise of an Alternative Network. Temple University Press. ISBN 1-56639-777-4.
- Legrand, Laurent; Lherminier, Jacques; Mannoni (1992). Chronique du cinéma [Chronicles of the Cinemai] (in French). Éditions Chronique. ISBN 978-2-905969-55-2.
- Long, Stewart (1979). The Development of the Television Network Oligopoly: Dissertations in Broadcasting. Ayer Publishing. ISBN 0-405-11764-7.
- Murray, Michael (1999). Encyclopedia of Television News D. Greenwood Publishing Group. ISBN 1-57356-108-8.
- Murray, Michael D.; Godfrey, Donald G., eds. (1997). Television in America: Local Station History from Across the Nation. Ames, Iowa: Iowa State Press. ISBN 0-8138-2969-0.
- Pasiuk, Laurie (2005). Vault Guide to the Top Media and Entertainment Employers. Vault, Inc. ISBN 978-1-58131-337-6.
- Quinlan, Sterling (1979). Inside ABC: American Broadcasting Company's Rise to Power. New York: Hastings House. ISBN 0-8038-6765-4.
- Smith, Dave (1998). Disney A to Z: The Updated Official Encyclopedia. New York City: Hyperion Books. ISBN 0-7868-6391-9.
- Stabile, Mark; Harrison, Carol A. (2003). Prime Time Animation: Television Animation and American Culture. Routledge. ISBN 0-415-28326-4.
- Sterling, Christopher (2004). The Museum of Broadcast Communications Encyclopedia of Radio. New York: Taylor & Francis. ISBN 1-57958-249-4.
- Vane, Lynne S.; Gross, Edwin T. (1994). Programming for TV, Radio, and Cable. Focal Press. p. 181. ISBN 0-240-80128-8.
- Walker, Jesse (2004). Rebels on the Air: An Alternative History of Radio in America. NYU Press. ISBN 0-8147-9382-7.
- Weinstein, David (2006). The Forgotten Network: DuMont and the Birth of American Television. Temple University Press. ISBN 1-59213-499-8.
- Wittebols, James H. (2004). The Soap Opera Paradigm: Television Programming and Corporate Priorities. Rowman & Littlefield. ISBN 0-7425-2002-1.
