= Acrobat Ranch =

- Genre: Children's television series
- Country of origin: United States
- Original language: English

Production
- Running time: 30 minutes

Original release
- Network: ABC
- Release: August 19, 1950 – May 12, 1951

Acrobat Ranch is an American children's television series that aired on ABC on Saturday morning from August 19, 1950, to May 12, 1951. The program is notable for being one of ABC's first Saturday morning children's shows. It was also "ABC's entry into the morning TV field".

== Summary ==
The program consisted of circus acts, audience participation games, and stunts. Acrobat Ranch had a circus theme. Placed against a Western backdrop, acrobats Tumbling Tim and Flying Flo lent an air of spectacle to Acrobat Ranch. In one segment, host Uncle Jim presided over a game in which children from the studio audience competed for merchandise prizes.

== Cast ==
The cast included:

- Valerie Alberts as Flying Flo
- Billy Alberts as Tumbling Tim
- Jack Stillwell as Uncle Jack

== Production ==
Acrobat Ranch was broadcast live and originated from WENR in Chicago. Norm Heyne was the director. General Shoe Corporation sponsored the program.
