= The Bod Squad =

Television series of animated public service announcements

- Written by: Lynn Ahrens
- Country of origin: United States
- Original language: English
- No. of seasons: 2
- No. of episodes: 7

Production
- Running time: 30 seconds 1 minute ("Chopper")
- Production companies: DePatie–Freleng Enterprises; ABC

Original release
- Network: ABC
- Release: 1974 – 1977

The Bod Squad is a series of short public service announcements broadcast on Saturday mornings on the ABC television network, from 1974 through 1994. These thirty-second and one-minute segments promoted healthy nutrition and personal hygiene through humorous animation and catchy music with clever lyrics. The shorts were written by Lynn Ahrens and animated by DePatie–Freleng Enterprises.

The segments generally appeared at half-hour intervals, interspersed with regular commercials, between Saturday morning cartoon programs. While many were not labeled as such, the first four segments ended with an announcement, "Another nutritional message from the ABC Television Network", and accompanying stock animation identifying the series as The ABC Bod Squad.

The same original segments produced in the 1970s repeated every Saturday morning for several years, so that many if not most American TV-watching children during that period are familiar with them. Throughout the 1970s and 1980s ABC broadcast several other series of educational public service cartoon spots as well, including Time for Timer and, perhaps the most famous of all, Schoolhouse Rock.

== Episodes ==
- Yuk Mouth: Yuk Mouth (Scatman Crothers) doesn't brush his teeth and eats junk food, causing him to get a cavity.
- The Munchies: encourages children to do other things instead of letting "the Munchies" make them eat more.
- Quickfast: suggesting pre-made or leftover foods for breakfast, or easily prepared foods such as toast, for children who don't have much time to eat breakfast.
- Nutty Gritty: Scatman Crothers sings about making a "Nutty Gritty" snack with nuts and raisins.

Three more Bod Squad shorts were produced in 1977:

- Chopper: The Chopper, a Fonzie lookalike, reminds you to exercise your teeth with healthy food.
- Make A Saturdae: about using healthy foods such as bananas and yogurt to make a "Saturdae", which is like a sundae.
- Don't Drown Your Food: Louis the Lifeguard (Arnold Stang) rescues a drowning potato and encourages children not to overuse condiments, such as gravy, ketchup and salad dressing, and learn to enjoy the natural flavors of vegetables, eggs, etc.

Additional ABC nutritional spots, by the production team of Schoolhouse Rock

- Beans and Rice: (sung by Jack Sheldon and Bob Dorough)
- Gimme Some Skin: The health benefits of potatoes (sung by Jack Sheldon)
- Slow Food: About not eating too fast
- Love Won't Add Weight: Parents should reward or console their children with affection, rather than desserts
- Pop Corn: A snack that doesn't load you down with calories.
- Water: The Best No Calorie Drink: (sung by Bob Dorough)
- Wrappers: Fruits that come in their own wrappers (sung by Bob Dorough)
