= Time for Timer =

ABC series of animated PSAs (1975–1992)

- Timer in "Eat Some Kind of Breakfast"
- Written by: John Bradford; Larry Spiegel
- Starring: Lennie Weinrib
- Composer: Dean Elliott
- Country of origin: United States
- Original language: English
- No. of seasons: 1
- No. of episodes: 7

Production
- Running time: 30 seconds–1 minute
- Production companies: DePatie–Freleng Enterprises; ABC

Original release
- Network: ABC
- Release: 1975

Related
- The Bod Squad

Time for Timer is a series of seven short public service announcements broadcast on Saturday mornings on the ABC television network starting in 1975. The animated spots feature Timer, a tiny cartoon character who is an anthropomorphic circadian rhythm, the self-proclaimed "keeper of body time." The series was produced by the cartoon studio DePatie-Freleng Enterprises.

Timer first appears in the 1973 ABC Afterschool Special "The Incredible, Indelible, Magical, Physical Mystery Trip", where he was voiced by Len Maxwell, and aired on the network on February 7, 1973. In this special, he works inside the body of a man named Uncle Carl.

Timer also appears in the 1974 ABC Afterschool Special "The Magical Mystery Trip Through Little Red's Head", working inside a teenaged Red Riding Hood, and aired on the network on May 15, 1974. In this special, and in all future appearances, Timer's voice was provided by actor Lennie Weinrib.

Time for Timer ran until 1992 concurrently with ABC's other educational spots, primarily The Bod Squad and Schoolhouse Rock! They generally appeared during cartoon programs at the end of commercial breaks. The shorts included a Consultant credit for Dr. Roslyn B. Alfin-Slater, UCLA School of Public Health.

== Episodes ==
- "I Hanker Fer a Hunk O Cheese": Timer, recast as a cowboy with a thick Western accent, suggests "wagon wheels", sandwiches made with cheese slices and crackers, as an easy and nutritious snack. When Timer prepares one on a kitchen counter, he rolls it down the counter on its edge and exclaims, "Look! A wagon wheel!"
- "Take Care of Yourself": Timer shows how to brush teeth to protect them from cavities.
- "You Are What You Eat": Roving reporter Timer is at the digestive system to provide a simplified explanation of nutrients and how the body uses them.
- "Have A Carrot": Timer, channeling W. C. Fields, assembles some nutritious in-between meal snacks like carrot sticks for a boy. At the end of the short, Timer literally changes the boy into a banana as a gag.
- "Eat Some Kind of Breakfast": Timer shows that if people don't have time for breakfast, their stomach will be empty and angry; leftovers and other premade foods for breakfast is better than none at all.
- "Sunshine on a Stick": Timer suggests making ice pops with fruit juice, an ice tray, and toothpicks.
- "Don't Knock It Till You Try": Timer suggests trying new foods by eating a smorgasbord of smidgens of different foods.
