= The Pendulum, the Pit and Hope =

- Directed by: Jan Švankmajer
- Written by: Jan Švankmajer
- Based on: "The Pit and the Pendulum" by: Edgar Allan Poe; "A Torture by Hope"; Auguste Villiers de l'Isle-Adam
- Produced by: Klára Stoklasová
- Starring: Jan Záček
- Cinematography: Miloslav Špála
- Edited by: Helena Lebdušková
- Production company: Krátký film Praha
- Release date: July 28, 1983
- Running time: 15 minutes
- Country: Czechoslovakia
- Language: Czech

The Pendulum, the Pit and Hope (Czech: Kyvadlo, jáma a naděje) is a 1983 Czechoslovak animated short film directed by Jan Švankmajer, adapted from Edgar Allan Poe's 1842 short story "The Pit and the Pendulum" and Auguste Villiers de l'Isle-Adam's story "A Torture by Hope".

== Awards ==
- Montréal World Film Festival 1984 – Won Jury Prize (Short Films)
- Kraków Film Festival 1984 – Won FICC Award
- International Short Film Festival Oberhausen 1985 – Won Grand Prize and FIPRESCI Award
- Fantasporto 1985 – Won Critics' Award - Special Mention
