= The Iron Shroud =

1830 short story by William Mudford

"The Iron Shroud" or less commonly known as the "Italian Revenge" is a short story of Gothic fiction written by William Mudford in 1830 and published in Blackwood's Edinburgh Magazine and also as a twenty four page chapbook. It is a classic predicament story about a noble Italian hero who is confined in a continuously and imperceptibly contracting iron torture chamber. In the story, the chamber walls and ceiling are slowly contracting, day by day, through mechanical means, to the point of eventually crushing and enveloping the victim, thus metaphorically becoming his iron shroud. The story is considered to have provided Edgar Allan Poe with the idea of the shrinking cell in his short story "The Pit and the Pendulum" and it is viewed as Mudford's most famous tale.

== Plot summary ==
"As he lay gathered up in lessened bulk, the bell beat loud and frequent--crash succeeded crash -- and on, and on, and on came the mysterious engine of death, till Vivenzio's smothered groans were heard no more! He was horribly crushed by the ponderous roof and collapsing sides--and the flattened bier was his Iron Shroud."
William Mudford in the "Iron Shroud"

The story takes place in the torture chamber of Tolfi castle in Sicily. The hero of the story is Vivenzio who is confined into an iron cell built deep inside solid rock by the revenge-seeking Prince of Tolfi. Vivenzio is portrayed as a noble man, a warrior and hero of Naples, but one who fell out of favour with the Prince of Tolfi and is now about to be subjected to the subtle and remorseless punishment of the Prince. Unbeknownst to the victim, the ceiling and walls of the cell, made of smooth black iron, are imperceptibly contracting through mechanical action. At first the noble victim is unaware of the contracting action of the walls. With the passage of time however the prisoner becomes aware through visual cues that something is afoot. He notices that the irregularly spaced windows of the chamber start decreasing in number each passing day. With only two days left Vivenzio notices an inscription on the iron walls of his cell. The message was written by the engineer of the iron cell, Ludovico Sforza. Sforza explained in his message that at the command of the prince of Tolfi he created the mechanical cell in three years' time. When the chamber was completed, Tolfi ordered the incarceration and death of Sforza in the very chamber he had created. Through a deadly countdown the windows continue decreasing in number, from seven at the beginning of the story, until the end when only one window is left and the iron walls and ceiling contract around him enveloping him in a lethal embrace; the bed in his cell having transformed through mechanical spring action into a "funeral couch or bier". Ominously a large bell starts tolling loudly and frequently near the end, as his death approaches. The victim's ears are pierced by the sound and the bier gets crushed as the walls reach their final contraction. The flattened bier becomes the iron shroud of Vivenzio's dead body.

== Analysis ==
Edith Birkhead mentions that the "Iron Shroud" belongs in a type of horror story which is all the more striking because it is based on natural effects and not on the supernatural. She describes the suspense in the story as "ingeniously maintained" as the windows disappear one by one until the walls and the "ponderous roof", all finally collapse upon the victim.

In the "Iron Shroud" the hero, Vivenzio, is aware that he will eventually die. The only remaining question is the mode of his death. The uncertainty over the method of the execution and the manner of death creates the narrative tension. As he observes the windows disappearing one by one, he finally realises the method of his death:

"Yes, yes, that is to be my fate! Yon roof will descend!--these walls will hem me round--and, slowly, slowly, crush me in their iron arms! Lord God! look down upon me, and in mercy strike me with instant death! Oh, fiend--oh, devil--is this your revenge?"

The "iron arms" analogy is apt because in the end the mechanical cell will replace everything Vivenzio knew while incarcerated, including his body. His bed, his bier, his iron shroud and even his skeleton which will eventually turn to dust, will disappear because they will all be crushed. Everything will be replaced in the end by the iron walls of the cell, as if there were an exchange of bodies between Vivenzio and the iron cell. In fact the mind of the victim collapses in fear and enacts his death before it actually happens, thus in itself becoming an instrument of oppression and torture.

== Response and critical reception ==
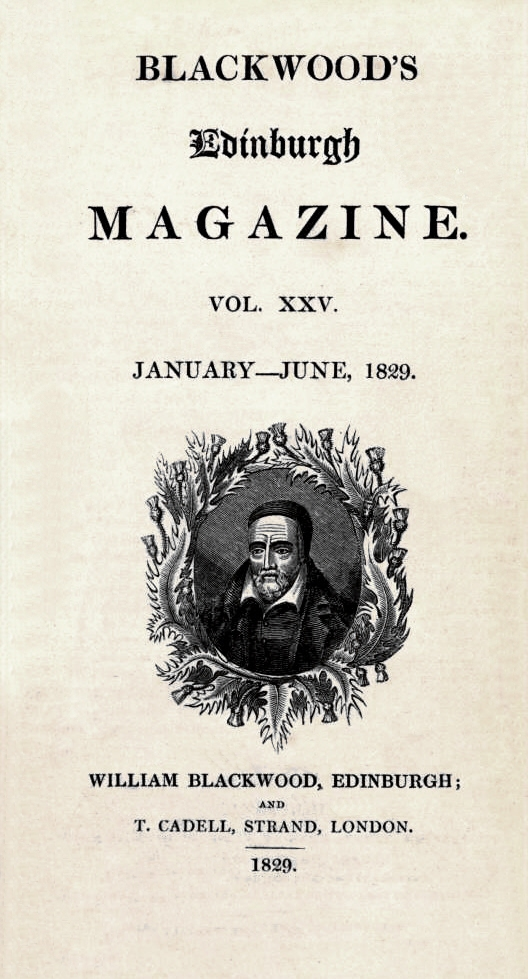
The Iron Shroud was published in Blackwood's Edinburgh Magazine

J. M. S. Tompkins in her 1927 work "Jane Eyre's 'Iron Shroud'" attributes the metaphor used by Charlotte Brontë in the thirty-fourth chapter of her work Jane Eyre:

My iron shroud contracted round me; persuasion advanced with slow sure step.

— Charlotte Brontë, Jane Eyre

to the direct influence of Mudford's story. Jerrold E. Hogle in The Cambridge Companion to Gothic Fiction comes to the same conclusion as Tompkins and adds that the young Brontës were avid readers of Blackwood's Magazine.

John H. Collins, analysing the influence of Mudford's work, comments that "the Shroud story is a first rate piece of writing comparable to the best half-dozen works by Poe" and that "it should not just be dismissed as a mere potboiler which the genius of Poe transformed." He goes on to mention that he thinks many readers mistakenly think that the "Iron Shroud" is one of Poe's works thus further strengthening Poe's reputation by attributing to him a story that he actually plagiarised.

Edith Birkhead calls the "Iron Shroud" a "skillfully constructed" story and mentions that Mudford has been described by Sir Walter Scott as an author who "loves to play at cherry-pit with Satan."; a Shakespearean expression used to indicate familiarity with the Devil.

Alexander Hammond, Associate Professor and Vice Chair of the Department of English at Washington State University, in his essay "Subverting Interpretation: Poe’s Geometry in “The Pit and the Pendulum”" suggests that Mudford's countdown of windows in the "Iron Shroud" may have influenced Poe in using numerical and geometrical clues in the "Pit and the Pendulum" to confuse and frighten his narrator.

Elizabeth Gaskell, in Mary Barton describes an Italian torture chamber where the victim is afforded many luxuries at first but in the end the walls of the cell start closing in and finally they crush him. It is believed that the story has been influenced by the "Iron Shroud". Stephen Derry mentions that Gaskell uses the concept of the shrinking cell to describe John Barton's state of mind but also added the element of luxury in order to further enhance it:

I have somewhere read a forcibly described punishment among the Italians, worthy of a Borgia. The supposed or real criminal was shut up in a room, supplied with every convenience and luxury; and at first mourned little over his imprisonment. But day by day he became aware that the space between the walls of his apartment was narrowing, and then he understood the end. Those painted walls would come into hideous nearness, and at last crush the life out of him. And so day by day, nearer and nearer, came the diseased thoughts of John Barton. They excluded the light of heaven, the cheering sounds of earth. They were preparing his death.

— Mrs. Gaskell, Mary Barton

Derry further mentions that Mrs. Gaskell's readers were familiar with the story of "The Iron Shroud" as was Charlotte Brontë.

The abolitionist and author, Lydia Maria Child, likened the closing walls to the oppression of slavery and republished the story in the December 1842 edition of the National Anti-Slavery Standard:

Again and again have we thought of this thrilling story in connection with slavery; and never so much as within the last two years. It becomes more and more obvious that the walls are closing in upon the foul system and that it must inevitably be crushed.

In the September 1929 issue of Popular Mechanics an article by Harold T. Wilkins titled "Secrets of Ancient Torture Chambers" describes the [fictitious] shrinking torture chamber at the Tolfi castle in Sicily as an example of an ancient torture chamber and proposes a mechanical model to account for the contracting action of the chamber.
