= Jail Madrassa =

Religious seminary in Karachi, Pakistan

- Type: Religious seminary
- Location: Karachi, Pakistan

Jail Madrassa is a religious seminary in Karachi, Pakistan that was used as a faith-based religious center for rehabilitation of drug addicts, juvenile criminals, and religious training for a fee.

This seminary came into limelight due to its brutal treatment of students for chaining, beatings, lashes, and deprival of food like in a torture chamber. Apparently, parents voluntarily paid for their children to attend 'Jail madrassa' to morphe themselves from the addiction of drugs or for the crimes, children have committed.

== Criticism ==
Upon meeting the teenagers by Hasan Kazmi, a BBC Urdu service's scribe, the inmates complained that they were forced to study all hours with no adequate food nor clothing. Another boy complained, Taliban visited the seminary to get prepared for battle.

According to Pakistan's police, they arrested the head of the seminary for subjecting students to torture and abuse under the basement of seminary. At least 18 of the teenagers aged under 20 were rescued. Some critics questioned the rationale behind the arrest of inmates in religious centre, which is also common in private jails run by feudal lords in Pakistan and drug-addict rehabilitation centers where inmates are chained to prevent them from escape.

Few reports also suggest that almost 50 students under the age of 18 were kept chained in the basement of seminary for sexual abuse. According to Rehman Malik, Pakistan's Interior Minister, he asked the police to investigate if the seminary had any links to the terrorist organisations like Tehreek-e-Taliban in imparting terrorist training.

According to CNN affiliate GEO News, the students were beaten and shocked with electric wires. According to police, some parents enrolled the students for religious training with no knowledge of harsh treatment to their children.
