= The Pit and the Pendulum =

Short story by Edgar Allan Poe

- Short story by Edgar Allan Poe
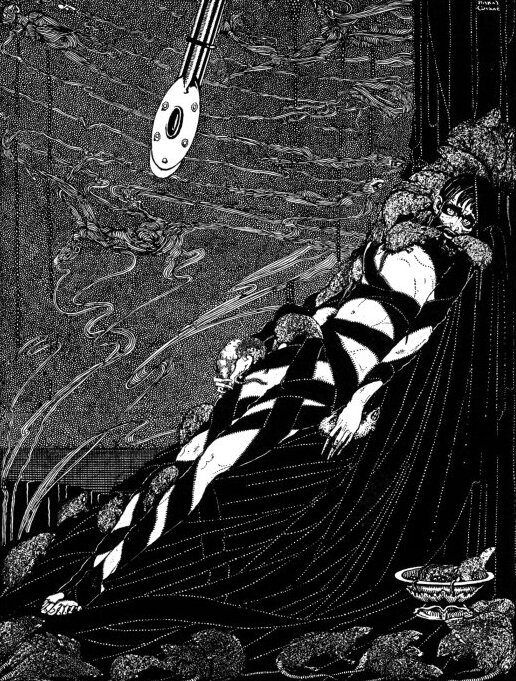
- Illustration by Harry Clarke, 1919.

Text available at Wikisource
- Country: United States
- Language: English
- Genres: Horror; Short story

Publication
- Published in: The Gift: A Christmas and New Year's Present for 1843
- Publication type: Periodical
- Publisher: Carey & Hart
- Media type: Print
- Publication date: 1842

"The Pit and the Pendulum" is a short story by American writer Edgar Allan Poe and a work of horror fiction. It was first published in 1842 in the literary annual The Gift: A Christmas and New Year's Present for 1843. The story is about the torments endured by a prisoner of the Spanish Inquisition, and is set very loosely during the Peninsular War between Spain and Napoleonic France (1808–1814), although it invokes the feared Inquisition of earlier centuries. The narrator of the story describes his experience of being tortured. The story inspires fear in the reader via its heavy focus on the senses, such as sound, emphasizing the inescapable reality of the coming doom. In this, it is unlike Poe's stories which invoke the supernatural. The tale has been adapted to film several times.

== Plot summary ==
The unnamed narrator is brought to trial before sinister judges of the Spanish Inquisition, charged with offenses that are never stated. As seven tall white candles on a table slowly burn down, the narrator feels his hopes of survival diminishing as well. He is condemned to death, whereupon he faints and later awakens to find himself in a totally dark room. At first the prisoner thinks that he is locked in a tomb, but then he discovers that he is in a cell. He decides to explore the cell by placing a scrap of his robe against the wall so that he can count the paces around the room, but he faints before he can measure the whole perimeter.

When he reawakens, he discovers food and water nearby. He tries to measure the cell again, and finds that the perimeter measures one hundred steps. While crossing the room in the darkness, he trips on the hem of his robe and falls, his chin landing at the edge of a deep pit. He realizes that had he not tripped, he would have fallen into this pit.

After losing consciousness again, the narrator discovers that the prison is slightly illuminated and that he is strapped to a wooden frame on his back, facing the ceiling. Above him is a picture of Father Time, holding a razor-edged pendulum measuring "a foot in length from horn to horn." The pendulum is swinging back and forth and slowly descending, designed to kill the narrator eventually. However, he smears his bonds with the meat left for him to eat, which attracts rats. The rats chew through the straps, and he slips free just before the pendulum would have begun to slice into his chest.

The pendulum is withdrawn into the ceiling, and the walls become red hot and start to move inward, forcing him slowly toward the center of the room and into the pit. As he loses his last foothold and begins to topple in, he hears a roar of voices and trumpets, the walls retract, and an arm pulls him to safety. The French Army has captured the city of Toledo and the Inquisition has fallen into its enemies' hands.

== Publication and response ==
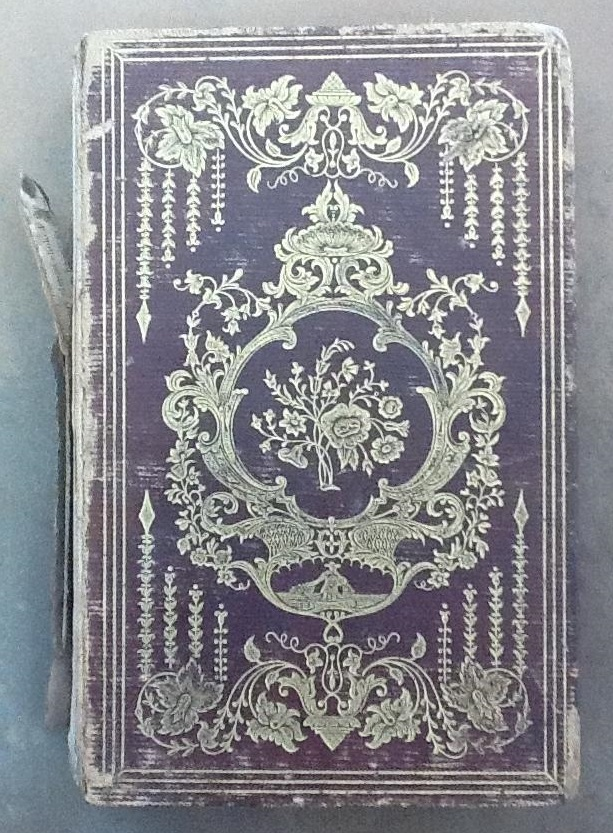
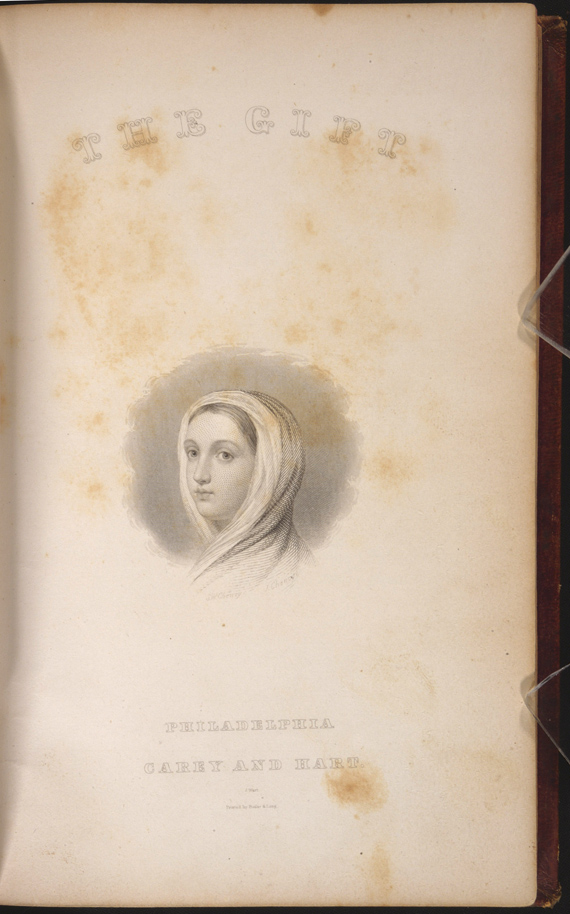
"The Pit and the Pendulum" was first published in The Gift, Carey and Hart, Philadelphia, 1843.

"The Pit and the Pendulum" was included in The Gift: A Christmas and New Year's Present for 1843, edited by Eliza Leslie and published by Carey & Hart. It was slightly revised for a republication in the May 17, 1845 issue of the Broadway Journal.

William Butler Yeats was generally critical of Poe, calling him "vulgar". Of "The Pit and the Pendulum" in particular he said it does "not seem to me to have permanent literary value of any kind... Analyse the Pit and the Pendulum and you find an appeal to the nerves by tawdry physical affrightments."

== Analysis ==
"The Pit and the Pendulum" is a study of the effect terror has on the narrator, starting with the opening line, which suggests that he is already suffering from death anxiety ("I was sick — sick unto death with that long agony"). However, there is an implicit irony in the reference to the black-robed judges having lips "whiter than the sheet upon which I trace these words", which shows that he has survived and is writing the story after the events. Unlike much of Poe's work, this story has no supernatural elements. The "realism" of the story is enhanced through Poe's focus on reporting sensations: the dungeon is airless and unlit; the narrator is subject to thirst and starvation; he is swarmed by rats; the razor-sharp pendulum threatens to slice into him; and the closing walls are red hot. The narrator experiences the blade mostly through sound as it "hissed" while swinging. Poe emphasizes this element of sound with such words as "surcingle", "cessation", "crescent", and "scimitar", and various forms of literary consonance.

Poe was following an established model of terror writing of his day, often seen in Blackwood's Magazine (a formula he mocks in "A Predicament"). Those stories, however, often focused on chance occurrences or personal vengeance as a source of terror. Poe may have been inspired to focus on the purposeful impersonal torture in part by Juan Antonio Llorente's History of the Spanish Inquisition, first published in 1817. It has also been suggested that Poe's "pit" was inspired by a translation of the Qur'an (Poe had referenced the Qur'an also in "Al Aaraaf" and "Israfel") by George Sale. Poe was familiar with Sale, and even mentioned him by name in a note in his story "The Thousand-and-Second Tale of Scheherazade". Sale's translation was a part of commentary and, in one of those notes, refers to an allegedly common form of torture and execution by "throwing [people] into a glowing pit of fire, whence he had the opprobrious appellation of the Lord of the Pit." In the Koran itself, in Sura (Chapter) 85, "The Celestial Signs", a passage reads: "...cursed were the contrivers of the pit, of fire supplied with the fuel... and they afflicted them for no other reason, but because they believed in the mighty, the glorious God." Poe may have been influenced to include a shrinking chamber by William Mudford's The Iron Shroud, a short story about an iron torture chamber which eventually crushes the victim inside. Mudford's story was published in Blackwood's magazine in 1830.

== Historical authenticity ==
Poe makes no attempt to describe accurately the operations of the Spanish Inquisition, and takes considerable dramatic license with the broader history premised in this story. The rescuers are led by Napoleon's General Antoine Charles Louis de Lasalle (who was not, however, in command of the French occupation of Toledo) and this places the action during the Peninsular War (1808–14), centuries after the height of the Spanish Inquisition. The elaborate tortures of this story have no historic parallels in the activity of the Spanish Inquisition in any century, let alone the nineteenth when under Charles III and Charles IV only four persons were condemned. The Inquisition was, however, abolished during the period of French intervention (1808–13).

The original source of the pendulum torture method is one paragraph in the preface of the 1826 book The history of the Inquisition of Spain by the Spanish priest, historian and activist Juan Antonio Llorente, relating a second-hand account by a single prisoner released from the Inquisition's Madrid dungeon in 1820, who purportedly described the pendulum torture method. Most modern sources dismiss this as fantasy. One theory is that Llorente misunderstood the account he heard; the prisoner was actually referring to another common Inquisition torture, the strappado (garrucha), in which the prisoner has his hands tied behind his back and is hoisted off the floor by a rope tied to his hands. This method was also known as the "pendulum".

Poe places a Latin epigraph before the story, describing it as "a quatrain composed for the gates of a market to be erected upon the site of the Jacobin Club House at Paris". The epigraph was not Poe's invention; such an inscription had been reported, no later than 1803, as having been composed with the intention (possibly facetious) of having it placed on the site, and it had appeared, without attribution, as an item of trivia in the 1836 Southern Literary Messenger, a periodical to which Poe contributed. It does not appear, however, that the market was ever built as intended. Charles Baudelaire, a French poet who translated Poe's works into French and who viewed Poe as an inspiration, said that the building on the site of the Old Jacobin Club had no gates and, therefore, no inscription.

== Adaptations ==
- Several film adaptations of the story have been produced, including the early French-language film Le Puits et le pendule in 1909 by Henri Desfontaines. The first English-language adaptation was in 1913, directed by Alice Guy-Blaché.
- The 1935 film The Raven, starring Boris Karloff and Bela Lugosi, features a pendulum torture device in the dungeon underneath the house of the Poe-obsessed Dr. Vollin, played by Lugosi.
- The 1943 episode of the radio drama Suspense, starring Henry Hull
- The 1961 film The Pit and the Pendulum, directed by Roger Corman and starring Vincent Price and Barbara Steele, like the other installments in the Corman/Price "Poe Cycle", bears minimal resemblance to the Poe story. The torture apparatus of the title makes its appearance only in the final ten minutes of the film. The reason for this is that the story is too short to be made into a feature-length film. The plan was to have a third act, which would be faithful to Poe, while the other two would be written in a manner that the cast and crew hoped would be similar to a Poe plot. A novelization of the film was written by Lee Sheridan, adapted from Richard Matheson's screenplay in 1961, and published by Lancer Books in paperback.
- The 1964 French film The Pit and the Pendulum was directed by Alexandre Astruc and stars Maurice Ronet.
- In The Flintstones season 5, episode 8, "Dr. Sinister", aired in 1964, Fred and Barney are menaced by a pendulum torture device until Barney discovers that he can use the blade to cut the bindings on his wrists. Later, Fred and Barney narrowly escape being thrown into a pit, which Dr. Sinister says is bottomless, hence anyone thrown in for crossing him would just keep falling for all eternity.
- A 1967 West German film adaptation of Poe's story called The Blood Demon was directed by Harald Reinl and stars Christopher Lee.
- In 1970, Vincent Price included a solo recitation of the story in the anthology film An Evening of Edgar Allan Poe.
- In a 1970 episode from the animated cartoon series The Perils of Penelope Pitstop, titled "London Town Treachery", the Hooded Claw has captured Penelope and attempts to kill her using a pendulum that swings lower and lower, as in Poe's story.
- In 1983, Czech Surrealist Jan Švankmajer directed a 15-minute live-action short film called The Pendulum, the Pit and Hope, based on this story and the short story "A Torture by Hope" by Villiers de l'Isle-Adam. It is a fairly faithful adaptation of both stories, featuring a unique first-person camera perspective and segments produced in Švankmajer's trademark stop-motion and cut-out animation. Most of the art design was done by his wife, Eva Švankmajerová.
- In 1989, the opening episode of the fifth season of the U.S. TV series MacGyver shows the protagonist strapped down as the intended victim of a Poe-like pendulum.
- In 1991, a film version of the story directed by Stuart Gordon and starring Lance Henriksen was released. The plot was altered to a love story set in Spain in 1492.
- The operatic metal band Nightwish released the 5-part epic song "The Poet and the Pendulum" on their 2007 album Dark Passion Play that draws much inspiration from Poe's work.
- The 2009 horror film directed by David DeCoteau bears little resemblance to the original story but, like the 1961 version, utilizes the large swinging pendulum in the penultimate scene. The film follows a group of university students who visit a hypnotherapy institute lorded over by a sinister hypnotist who wants to use the students to experiment with the possibility of breaking the pain threshold.
- The 2012 horror/mystery film The Raven, starring John Cusack in the role of Edgar Allan Poe, contains multiple reenactments of Poe's horror stories. Included is a scene where the "Pit and the Pendulum" scenario is re-created and successfully kills its victim.
- In 2013, the guitarist Buckethead produced an ekphrastic representation of "The Pit and the Pendulum" on an album called The Pit.
- The 2013 animated anthology Extraordinary Tales includes "The Pit and the Pendulum", narrated by Guillermo del Toro.
- The seventh episode of the Mike Flanagan directed Netflix miniseries The Fall of the House of Usher is titled "The Pit and the Pendulum" and features plot points loosely based on the short story.
