= Hugues Destrem =

French politician (1754–1804)

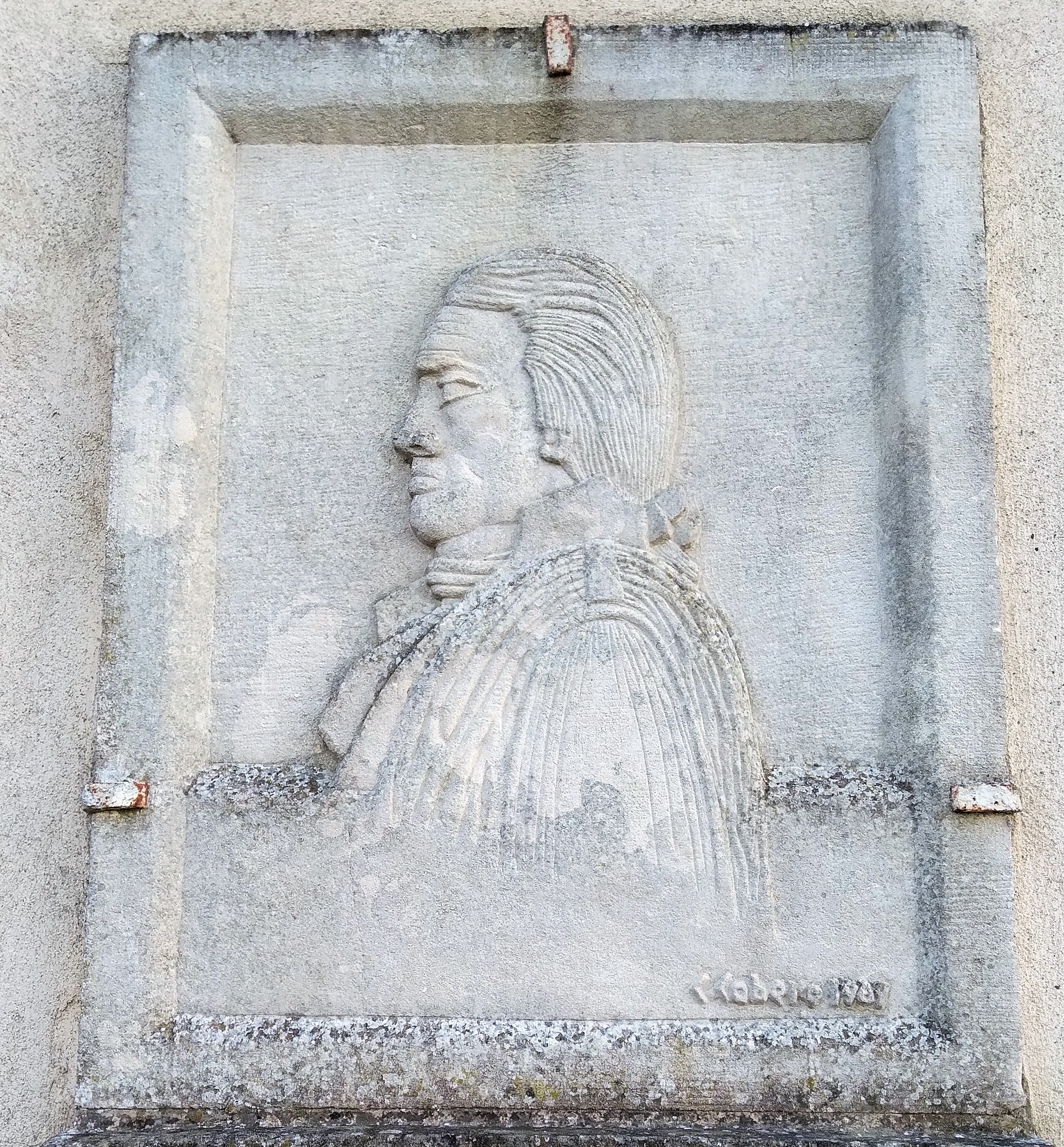

Hugues Destrem (8 February 1754 - 20 July 1804) was a French revolutionary and politician.

== Life ==
Born in Fanjeaux to Marie Holier and her merchant husband Louis Destrem, at the age of 17 Hugues married Anne Albarel and became a businessman in Fanjeaux. On the outbreak of the French Revolution he was elected mayor of the town. On 18 May 1791, in the name of the business committee, he published a report on creating a tax office at the Beaucaire fair, thus avoiding the need to go to Fourques or Arles.

On 1 September 1791 he became deputy for Aude in the Legislative Assembly, third out of eight candidates, with 139 out of 252 votes. He joined the moderate party and basically limited himself to commercial concerns. On 13 May 1792 he energetically opposed decrees banning the foreign export of wild animals, having them annulled. On the following 7 June, in the name of the extraordinary committees for finance and commerce, he issued an urgent decree allocating the necessary funds for the département of Aisne to buy grain in the districts not suffering from scarcity then affecting other countries.

After the fall of the monarchy and the end of the session, he was made government commissioner to the municipal administration of Toulouse. On 14 April 1798 he was elected deputy for Haute-Garonne at the Council of Five Hundred, with 276 out of 295 votes. He was elected secretary to the assembly on 21 December the same year alongside Quirot, Joubert and Rollin, dealing with financial and administrative questions. In August 1799 he communicated the details of the royalist uprising around Toulouse.

Hostile to the Coup of 18 Brumaire, he demanded explanations on the extraordinary convocation of the Council at the château de Saint-Cloud and the permanence of the moving sitting of 19. When Bonaparte entered the meeting room, Destrem raised his fist at him and said "So is that why you've won so many victories?". After the general left, Destrem supported Michel-Louis Talot's motion. Nevertheless, the soldiers entered the room and expelled the deputies. Also in 1799, François Gonord produced an etching of Destrem.

Destrem was proscribed the following day, but the new regime commuted the punishment to house arrest. Retiring to Fanjeaux, he was included on the list of Jacobins proscribed on 5 January 1801 after the plot of the rue Saint-Nicaise and exiled to Oléron. At the end of his three years' internment, he sailed for Guyana. His son successfully petitioned Napoleon for a pardon for him, but in the meantime he had escaped from Cayenne aboard an American ship with Étienne Michel, who had been exiled at the same time. He stopped off in Barbados before landing at Gustavia on 10 July 1804, dying there of yellow fever ten days later, aged fifty.

In 1908 a bronze bust of Destrem was made by Frédéric Brou for his birthplace, but Vichy France took it down as part of the 'mobilisation of non-ferrous metals' and sent it to Germany, where it was melted down.

== Sources ==
- (in French) "Base Sycomore entry".
- (in French) « Hugues Destrem », in Adolphe Robert and Gaston Cougny, Dictionnaire des parlementaires français, Edgar Bourloton, 1889–1891, volume 2, p. 371-372
- (in French) « Notes de lecture », Généalogie et Histoire de la Caraïbe, no 62, July–August 1994, p. 1097
- (in French) Amédée Gabourd, Histoire de la Révolution et de l'Empire : Consulat, Paris, Victor Lecoffre, 1863, volume 1, p. 411-412

== Bibliography ==
- (in French) Jean Destrem, Les Déportations du Consulat & de l'Empire d'après les documents inédits. Index biographique des déportés, Paris, Jeanmaire, 1885
- (in French) Jean Destrem, Le Dossier d'un déporté de 1804 (Hugues Destrem, Membre de l'Assemblée Législative et du Conseil des Cinq-Cents. Fanjeaux 1754 - Gustavia 1804), Paris, J. Dangon, 1904, 197 p.
- (in French) Jean Destrem, Les Fêtes de Fanjeaux, 23 août 1908. Inauguration du monument élevé à Hugues Destrem, maire de Fanjeaux, représentant du peuple, déporté à Cayenne par Bonaparte pour avoir combattu le coup d'État du 18 brumaire, Paris, Imprimerie de J. Dangon, 1909, 36 p.
- (in French) Guy Pujol, Guy Peyrot and Henri Gleizes, Hugues Destrem, illustre citoyen de Fanjeaux, 1754-1804, Mairie de Fanjeaux/Savary, 1989, 141 p. ISBN 2950097197
