= Glory Pulling Auguste de Villiers de l'Isle Adam From His Eternal Sleep =

Sculpture by Frédéric Brou

Coordinates: 48°51′27″N 2°21′44″E

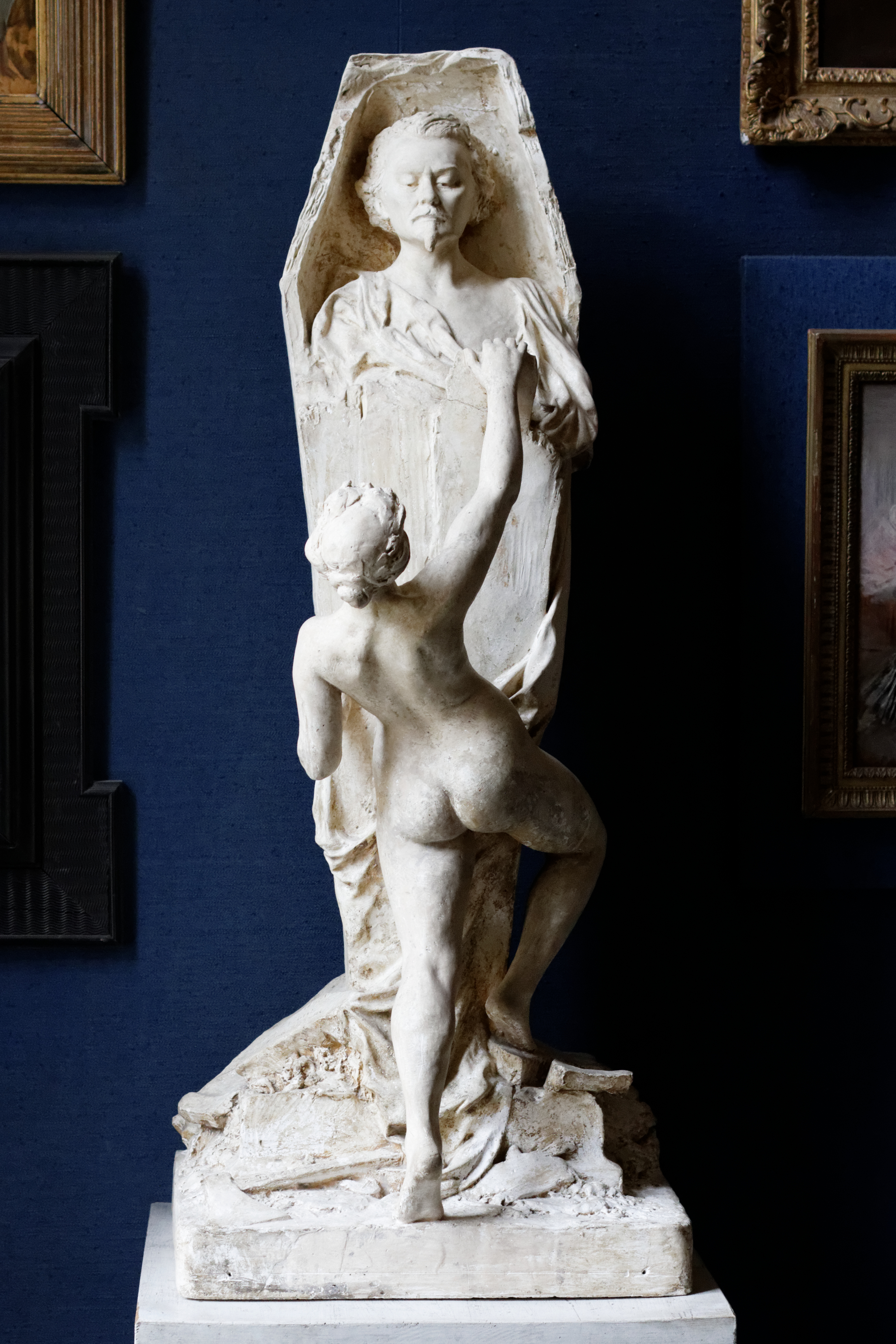

Glory Pulling Auguste de Villiers de l'Isle Adam From His Eternal Sleep is a 1906 maquette by Frédéric Brou for a tomb monument to the writer Auguste de Villiers de L'Isle-Adam.

== History ==
=== Burial and committee ===
The writer died on 18 August 1889 and was buried three days later in the cimetière des Batignolles. On 15 October 1895, his remains were moved to the 97th division of the cimetière du Père-Lachaise, where a new tomb was inaugurated on 15 December the same year. It consisted of a single Vire granite slab, on which was engraved his coat of arms and an inscription which translates as "A. de VILLIERS de l'ISLE ADAM, born at St. Brieuc on 7 November 1838, died in Paris on 18 August 1889".

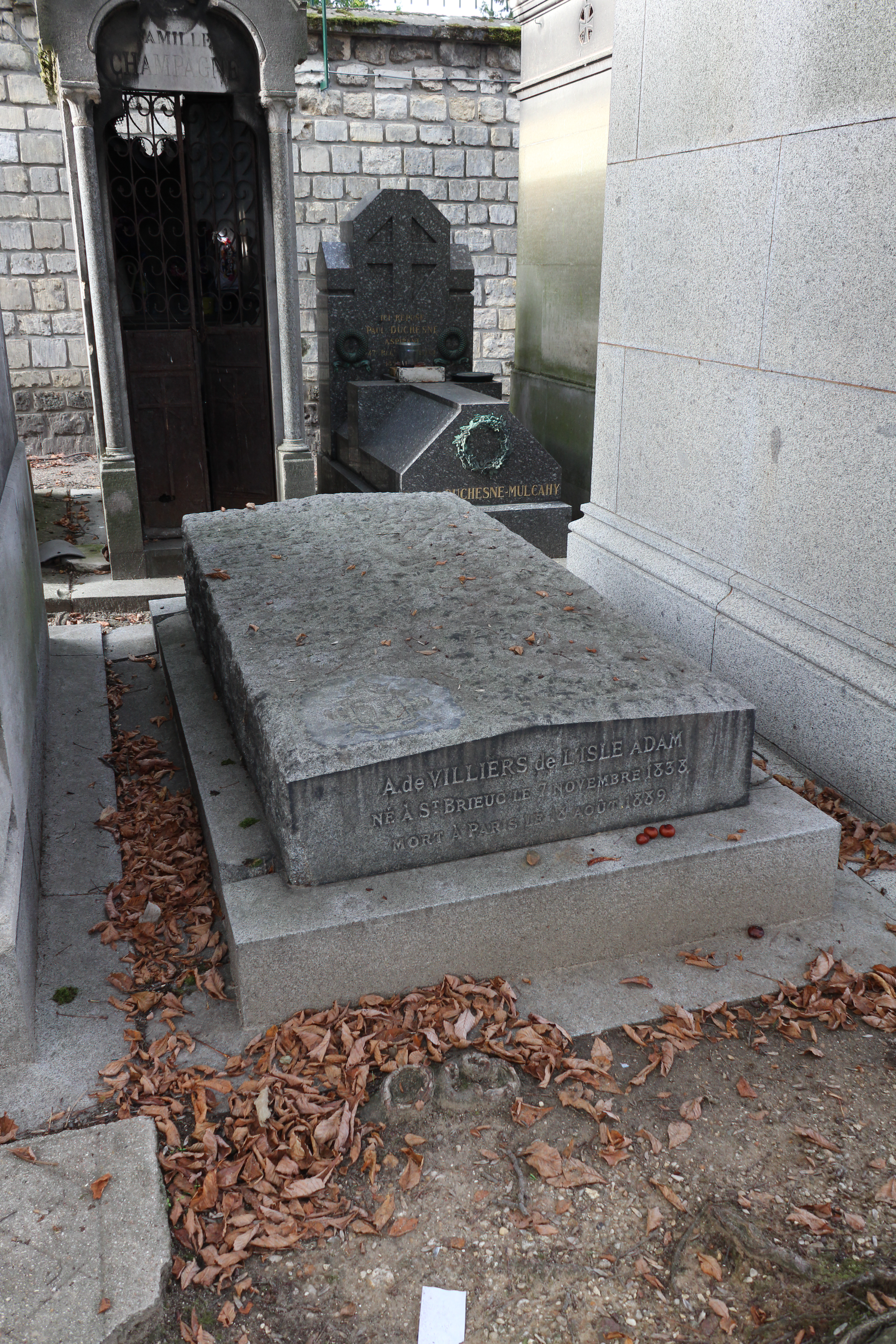

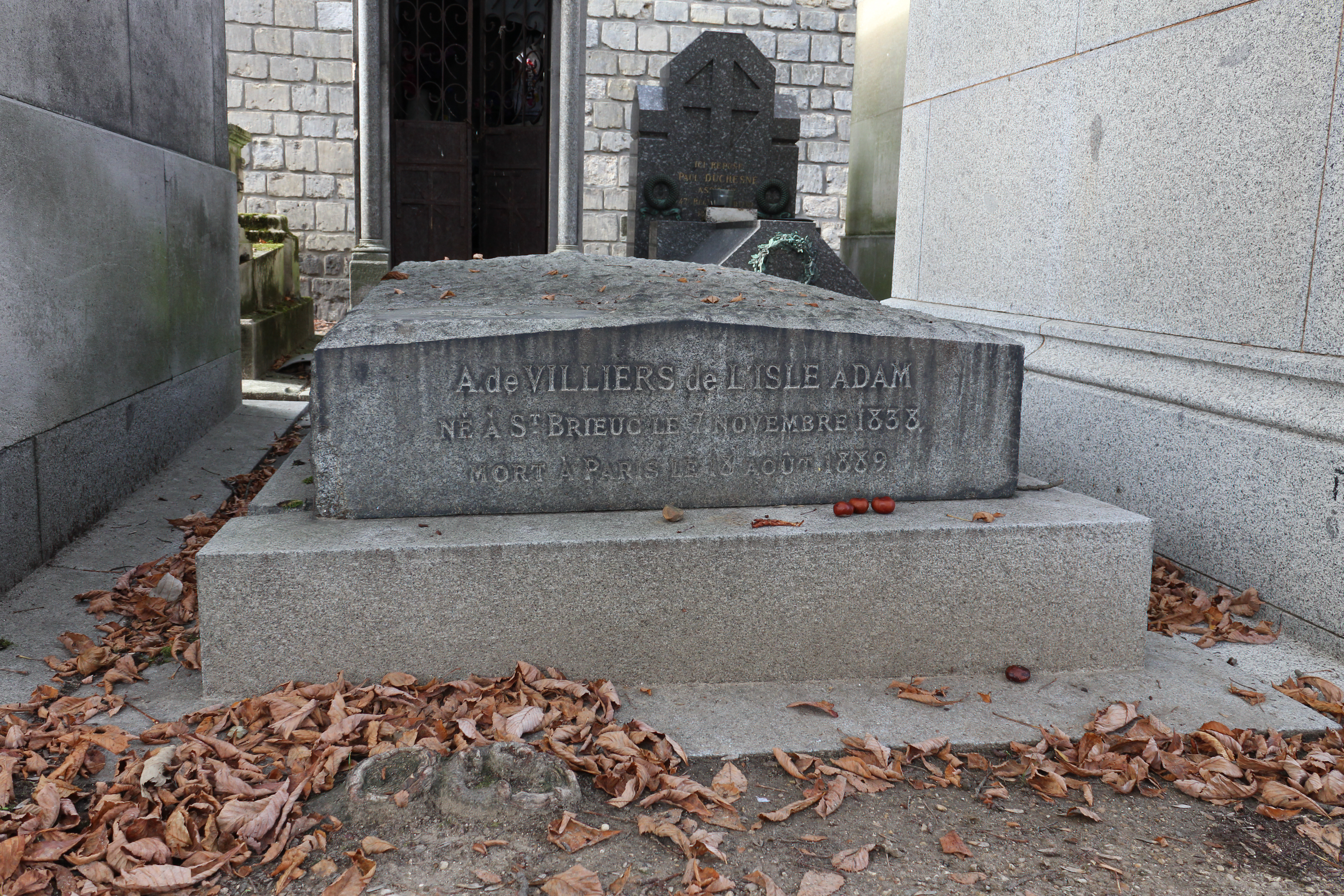

A committee was formed to plan a larger tomb monument, with Jean Richepin as its president and Auguste Blaizot as its treasurer. Its members were countess A. de Chabanes-La Palice, ([Madame ?] Daniel Lesueur), Judith Gautier, countess Mathieu de Noailles, princess Edmond de Polignac, R. Raoul-Duval, duchess de Rohan, G. Roussel-Despierres, MM. René Aubert, Léon Bloy, Jules Bois, Henry Bordeaux, René Boylesve, Adolphe Brisson, count de Chabannes-La Palice, Armand Dayot, Ernest Delahaye, Lucien Descaves, Jean Destrem, Léon Dierx, Anatole France, Alexandre Georges, Louis de Garamont, Gustave Guiche, Edmond Haraucourt, Lucien Hubert, Gustave Kahn, Georges Lemaire, count Léonce de Larmandie, Henri Lavedan, Pierre Louÿs, Maurice Maindron, Maurice Maeterlinck, Gustave de Malherbe, Paul Margueritte, René Martineau, Roger Marx, Massenet, Octave Mirbeau, Frédéric Mistral, count Robert de Montesquiou-Fézensac, general count du Pontavice de Heussey, Jacques Reboul, Henri de Régnier, Xavier de Ricard, Gustave Rouault, Camille de Sainte-Croix, Saint-Georges de Bouhélier, Saint-Saëns, Pierre Termier, Henri Turot, Alfred Vallette and Jean Veillon.

=== Brou ===
Brou produced several maquettes for the monument. A sculpture was presented to the Salon des artistes français in 1907, showing a nude woman tearing open Villiers de l'Isle Adam's coffin. A one-third size model is now in the musée Carnavalet and another at the same size as the final sculpture is in the musée d'art et d'histoire de Saint-Brieuc.

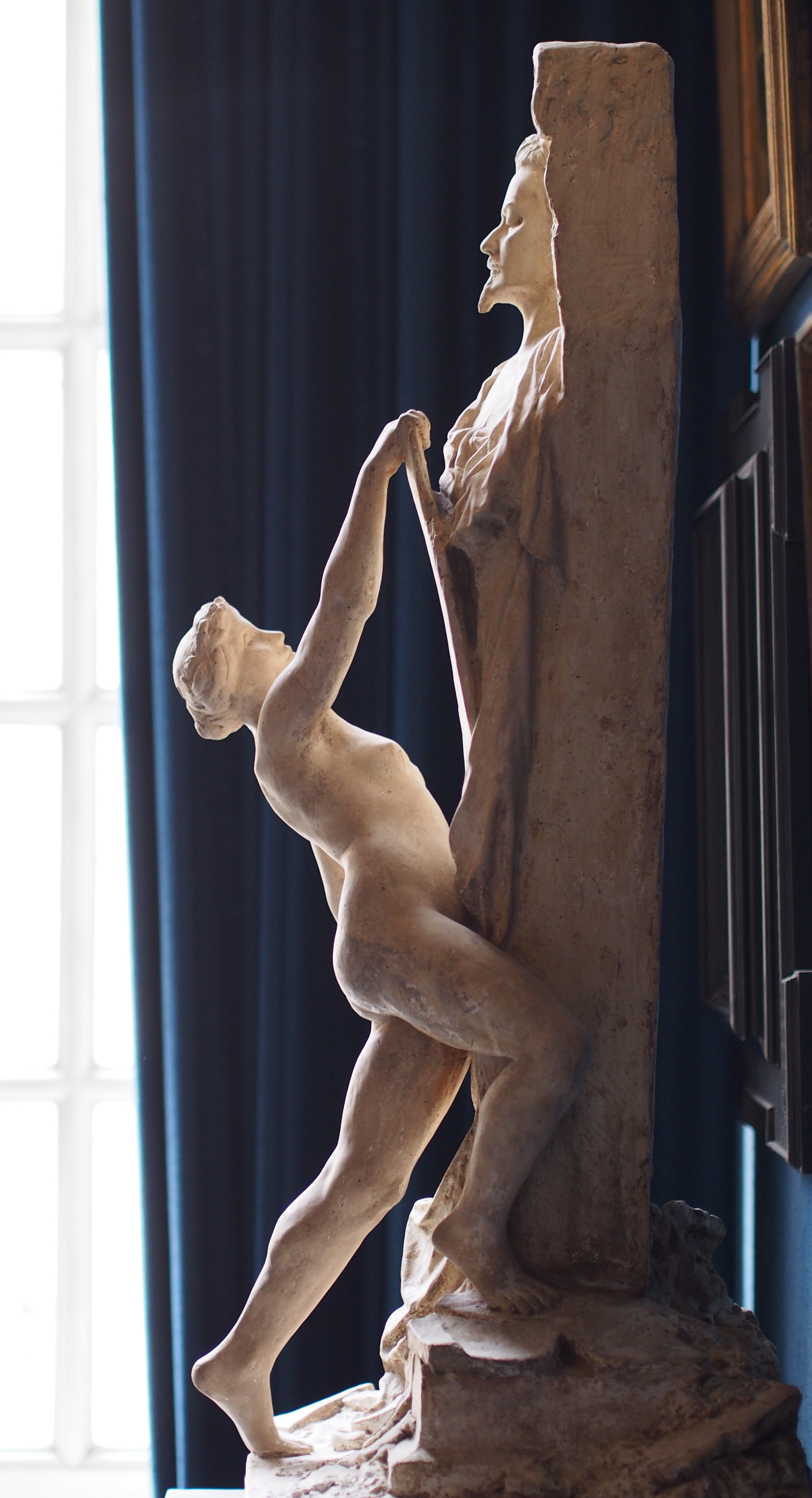

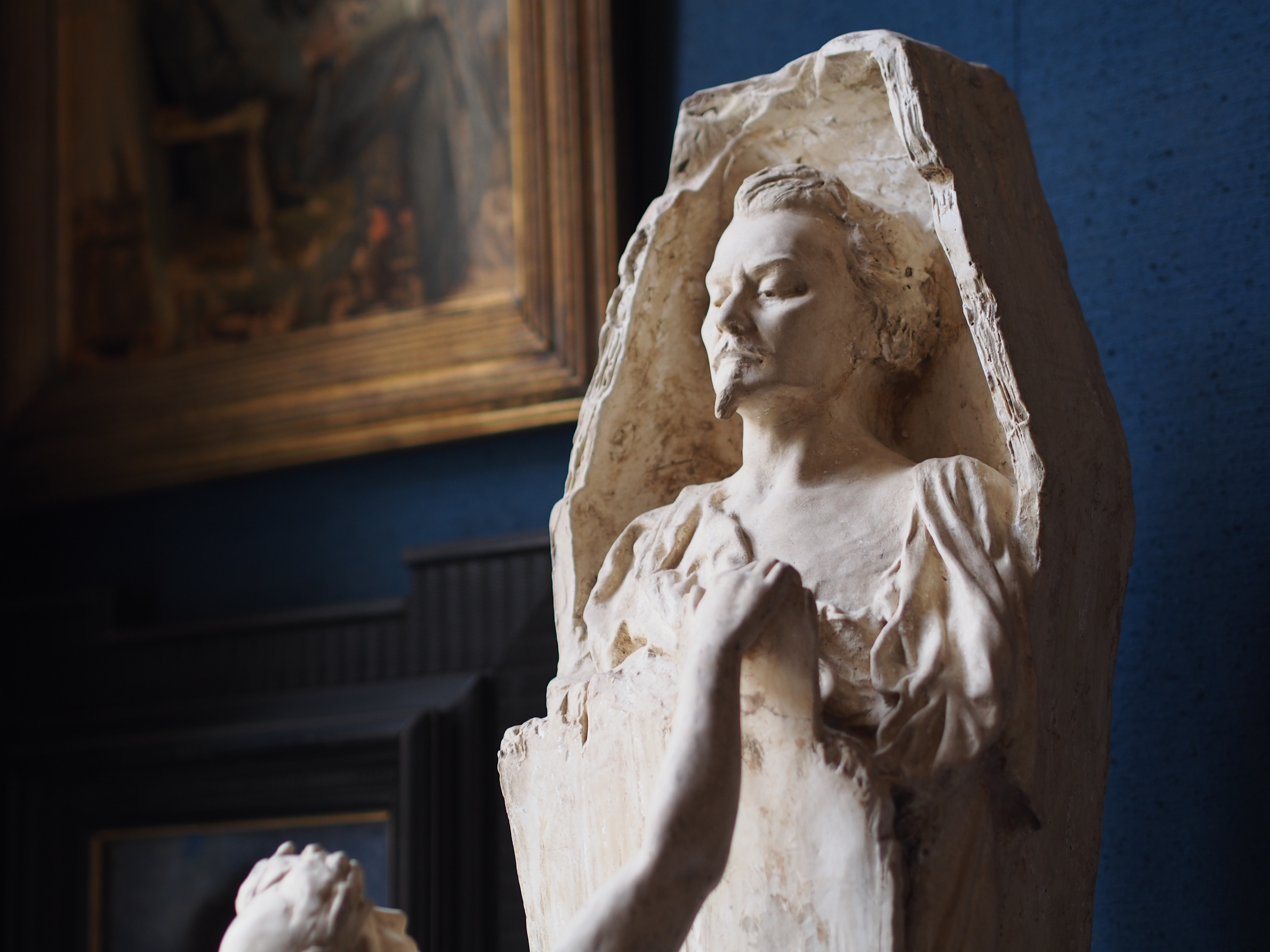

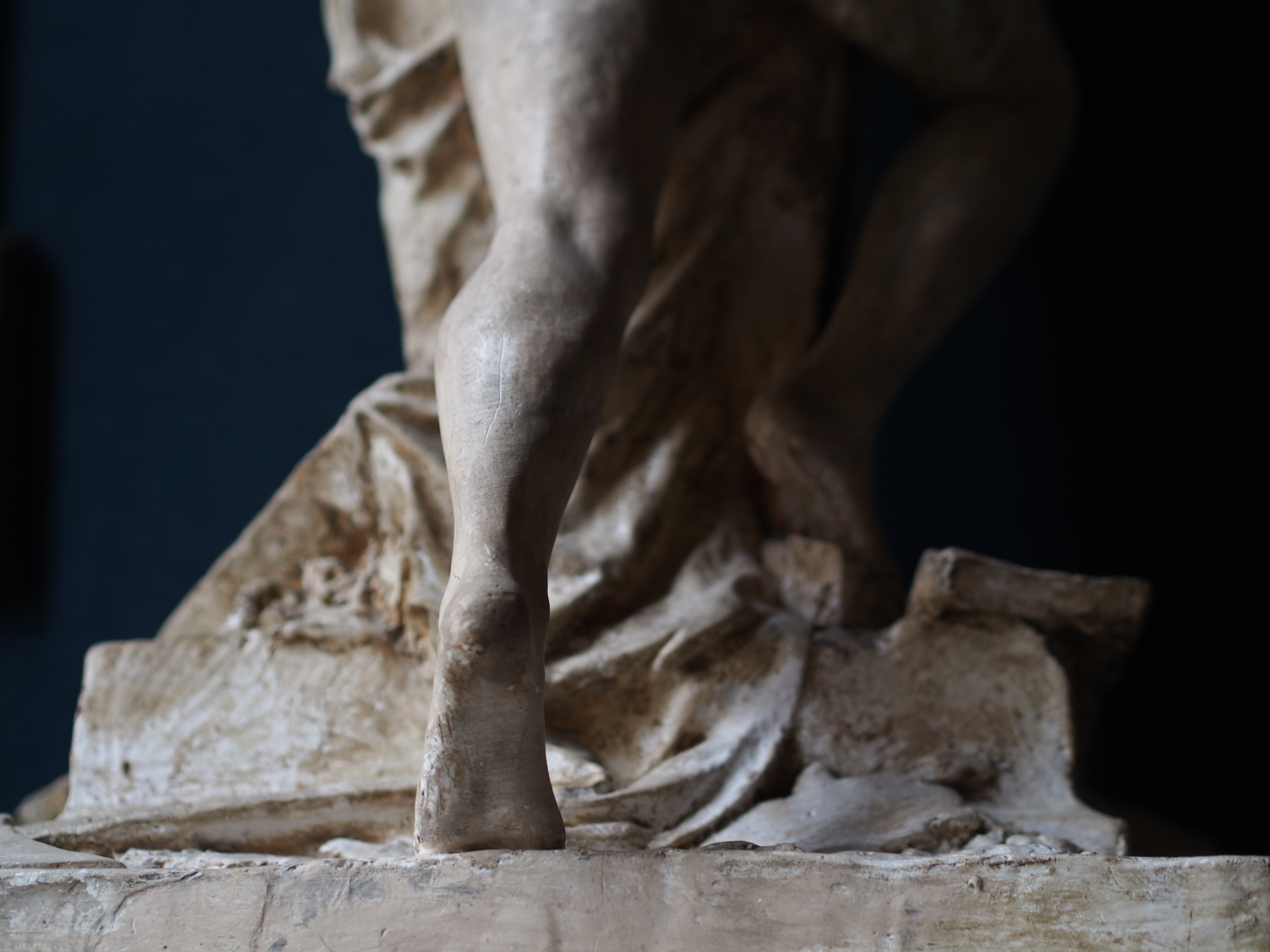

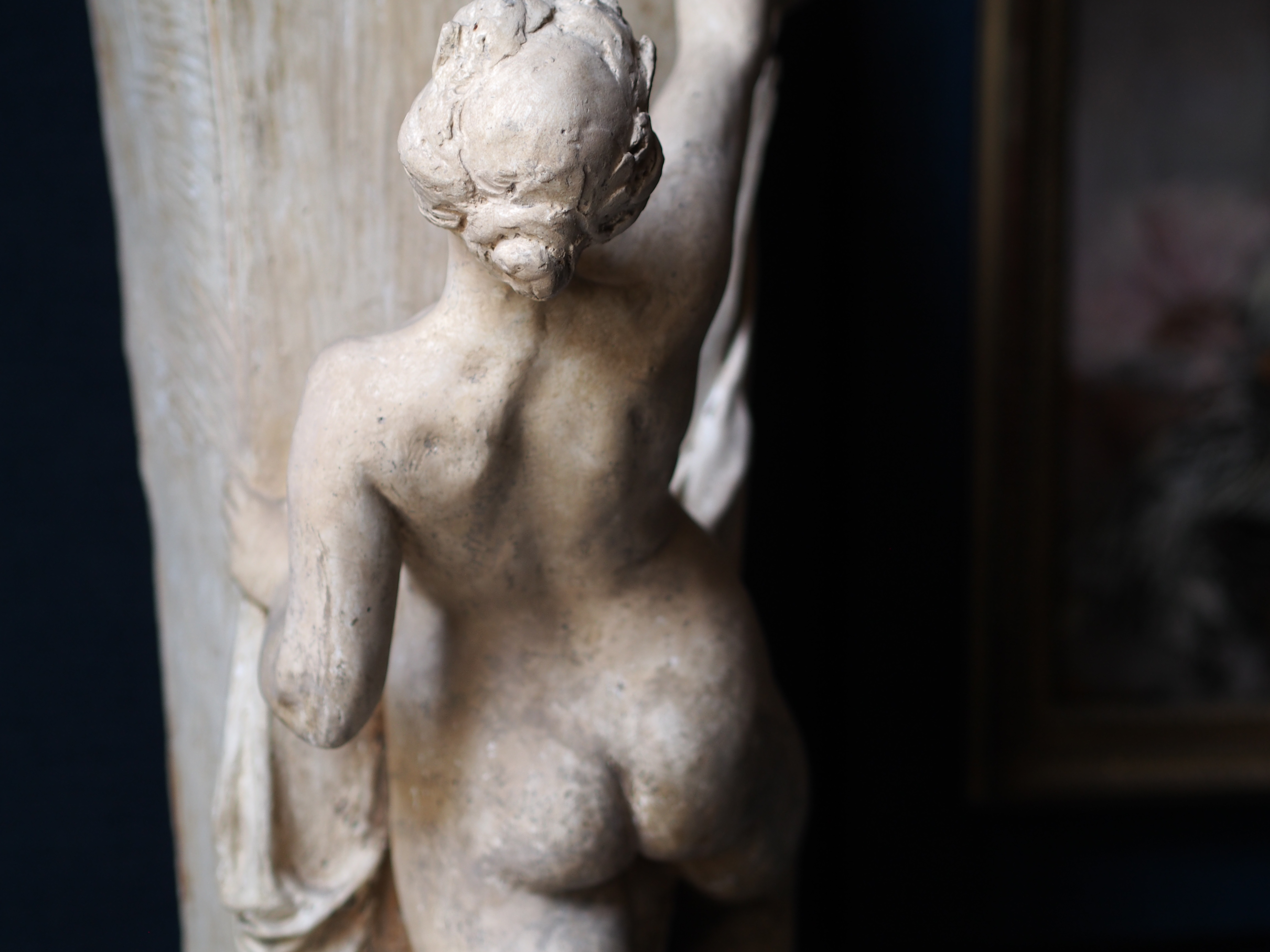

Léon Bloy said of it "Consider that the group is, in reality, I am not saying three people, but three figures. As I've said, there are Glory, glory the exciter, - such as Villiers could understand. She calls herself Tullia Fabriana, Claire Lenoir, Ellen, Morgane, Sara, Akédysséril; a unique woman, in both senses of the word. There is then Villiers awaking and, finally, there is Death signified by this coffin, standing like a man, trying to resist Glory!".

Bloy went on to say "The monument to Villiers de L'Isle-Adam is complete. If this is not a masterpiece, I shall abolish by decree this meaning of the word. However, other members of the committee were more critical - René Martineau wrote:

Brou, whose quite limited talent was that of a realist, brought back with much effort a fantastical conception of Bloy at an exhibition all the more sinister for giving him his exact proportions. He stood up a real coffin, in front of which is a lifesize nude woman, unpinning with an inexpert hand the topmost planks of the funerary engine from which a pomaded bust of Villiers, almost-smiling, not ironically - alas! - deigning to reappear like this on the most ungrateful of planets! The woman is as heavy as the vulgarity itself and immodest like a blasphemy. Jehan Rictus said "If only she still had wings on her back!"

whilst Lucien Descaves wrote "There are like that, in effigy, a few dead in the earth. All they needed was to erect the coffin there, like a night watchmen's sentry box. I know well that Paris is full of workshops, but this is no reason to make them guard our great men." The plan for the monument was definitively abandoned 1910.
