= Frédéric Brou =

French painter and sculptor (1862–1925)

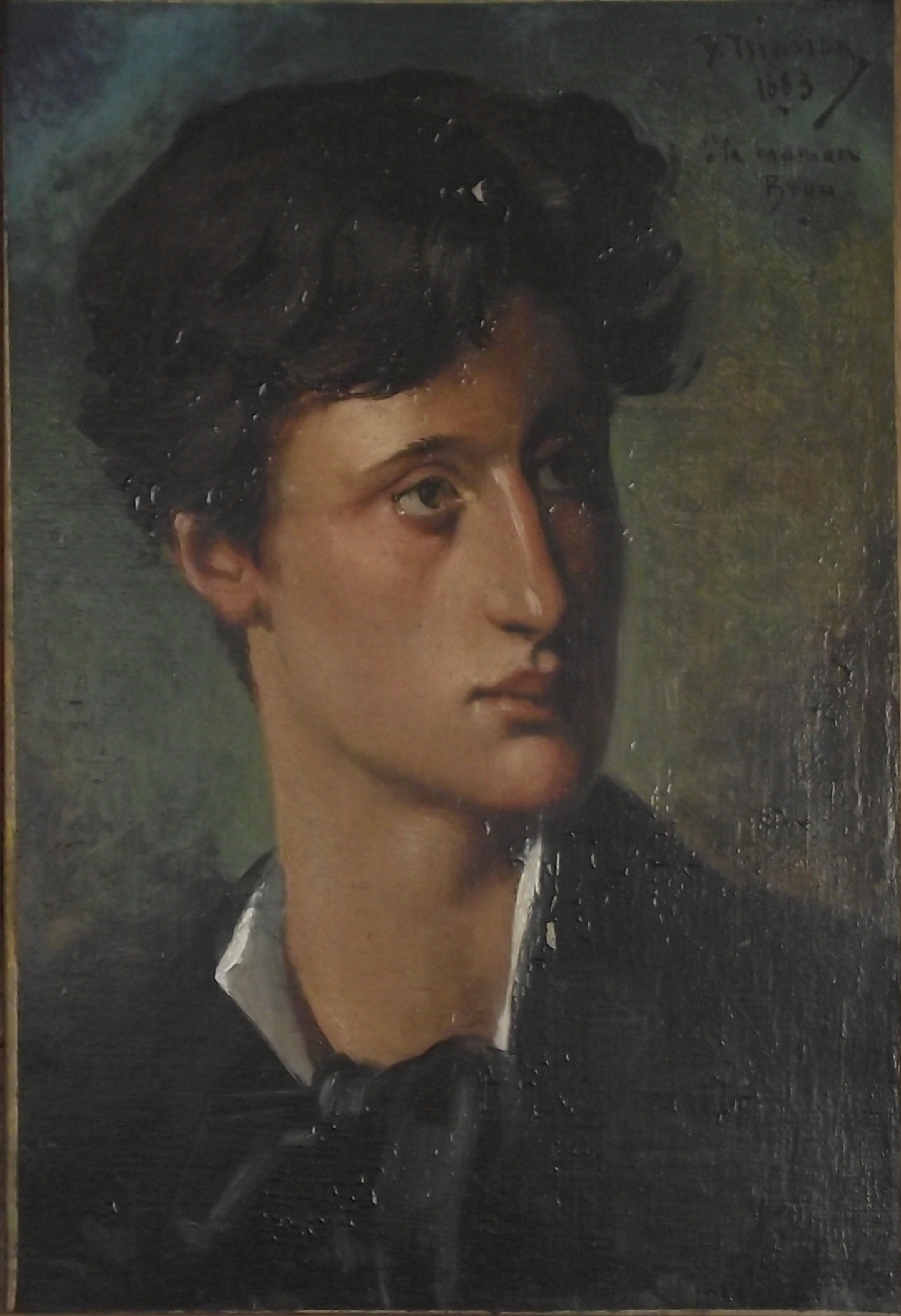
- Frédéric Brou
- Born: 1862; Mauritius
- Died: 1925 (aged 62–63)
- Occupation: Painter

Frédéric Brou (11 December 1862 - 15 May 1925) was a self-taught French painter and sculptor.

== Life ==
Born in Mauritius, he sculpted and exhibited in Boutteville from 1887 onwards. There he received advice from Antonin Larroux and Georges Lemaire. He exhibited the plaster modello for his sculpture Eve at the 1897 'salon des artistes français', exhibiting the finished work in marble at the same venue two years later, where it faced off against Rodin's work on the same subject. The French state commissioned a bust of Jules Ferry from him in 1899 and he regularly exhibited at the Société des artistes français. He died in Pleumeur-Bodou.

== Selected works ==
- Fanjeaux : Monument to Hugues Destrem
- Paris :
  - musée Carnavalet : Monument to Villiers de l'Isle Adam, also known as Glory Pulling Auguste de Villiers de l'Isle Adam From His Eternal Sleep, 1906, plaster maquette for the poet's tomb, never realised
  - square de Yorktown : Franklin Received at Court. 1778 and Signing of the Treaty of Paris. 1783, 1898, bronze bas-reliefs on the pedestal of the Monument to Benjamin Franklin by John J. Boyle
- Saint-Maur-des-Fossés, square Hameln : Eve, 1899, marble statue, the plaster modello for which was exhibited at the Paris Salon of 1897
Bas-reliefs by Brou on the pedestal of the Monument to Benjamin Franklin

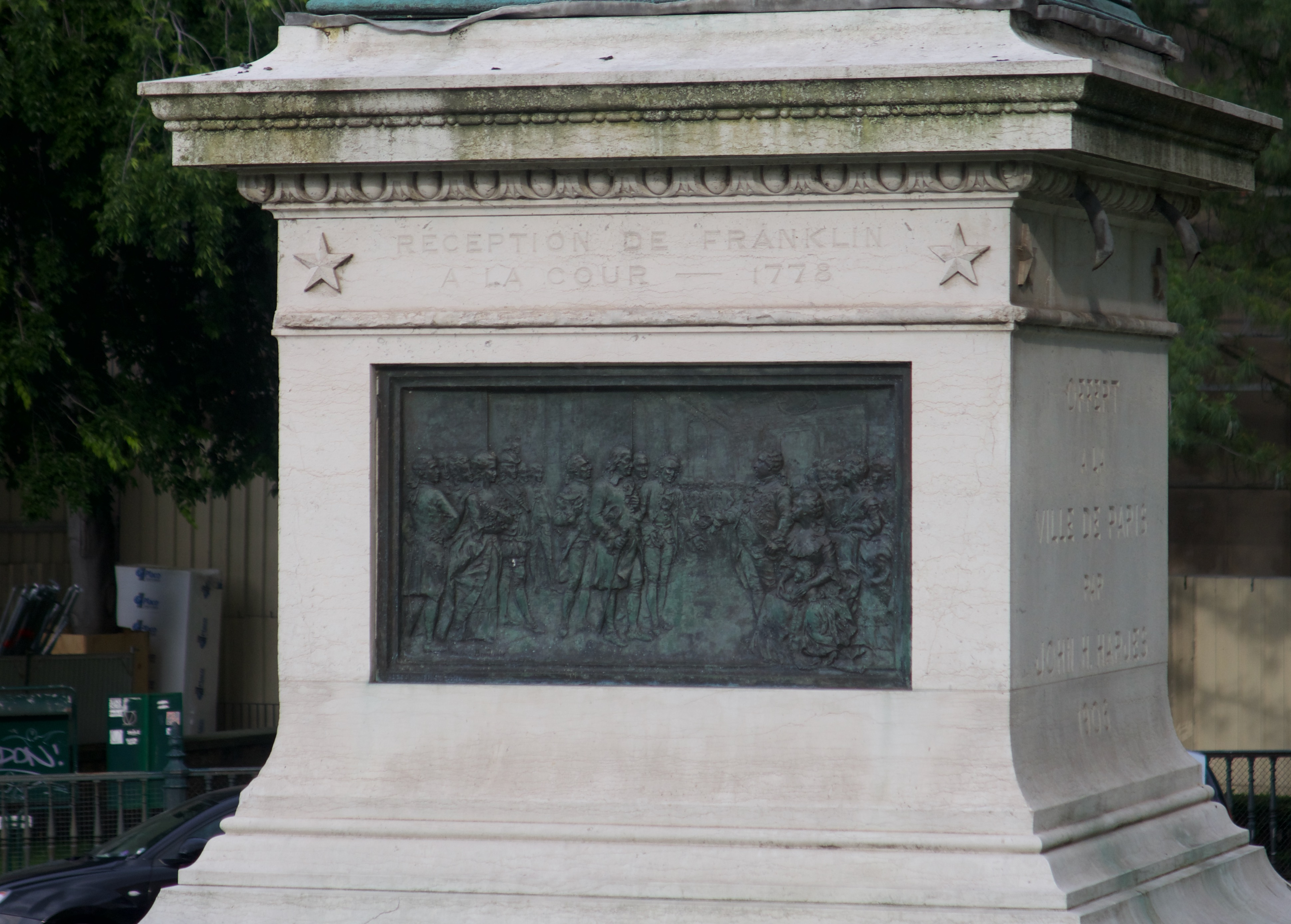
Franklin Received at Court. 1778

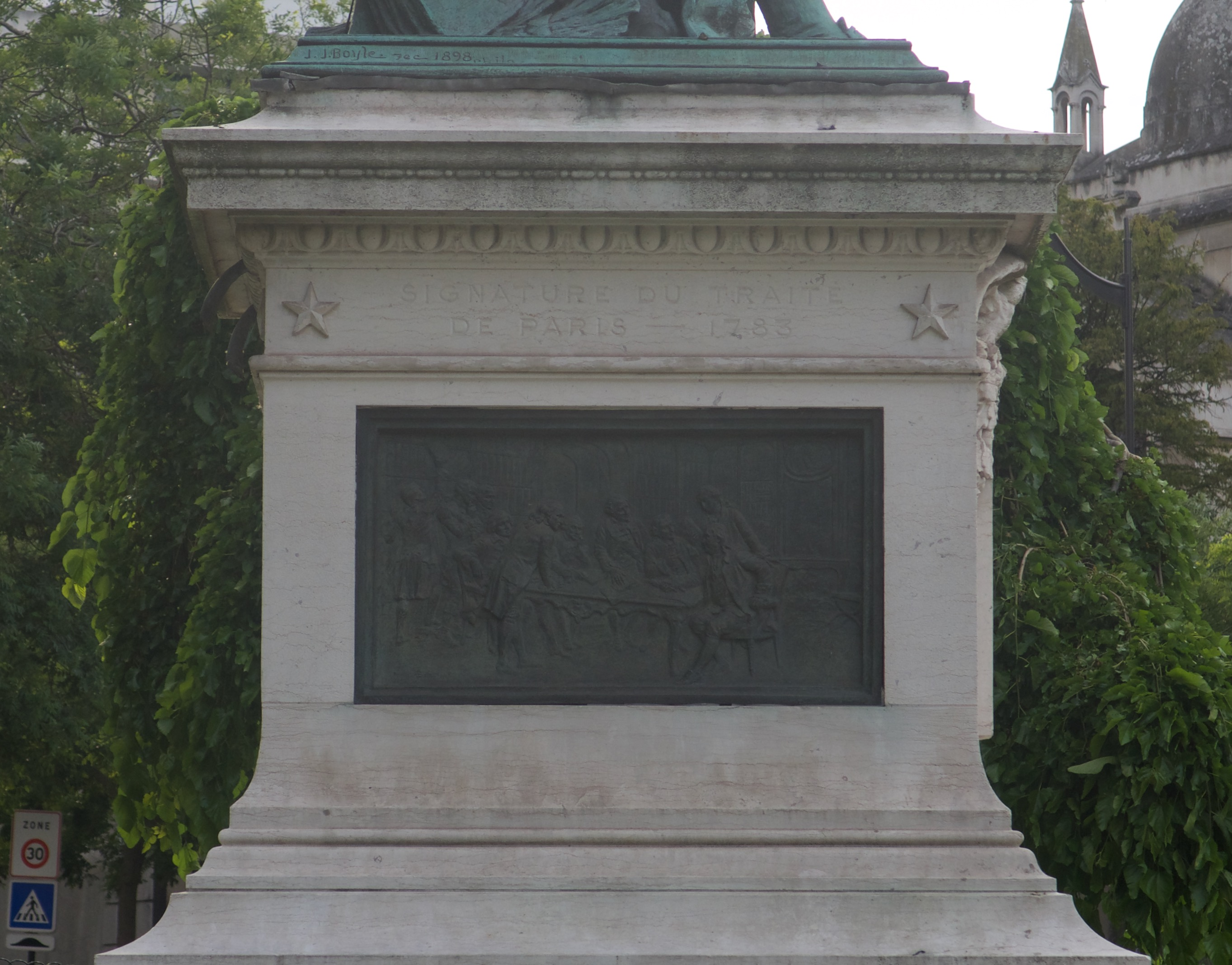
Signing of the Treaty of Paris. 1783

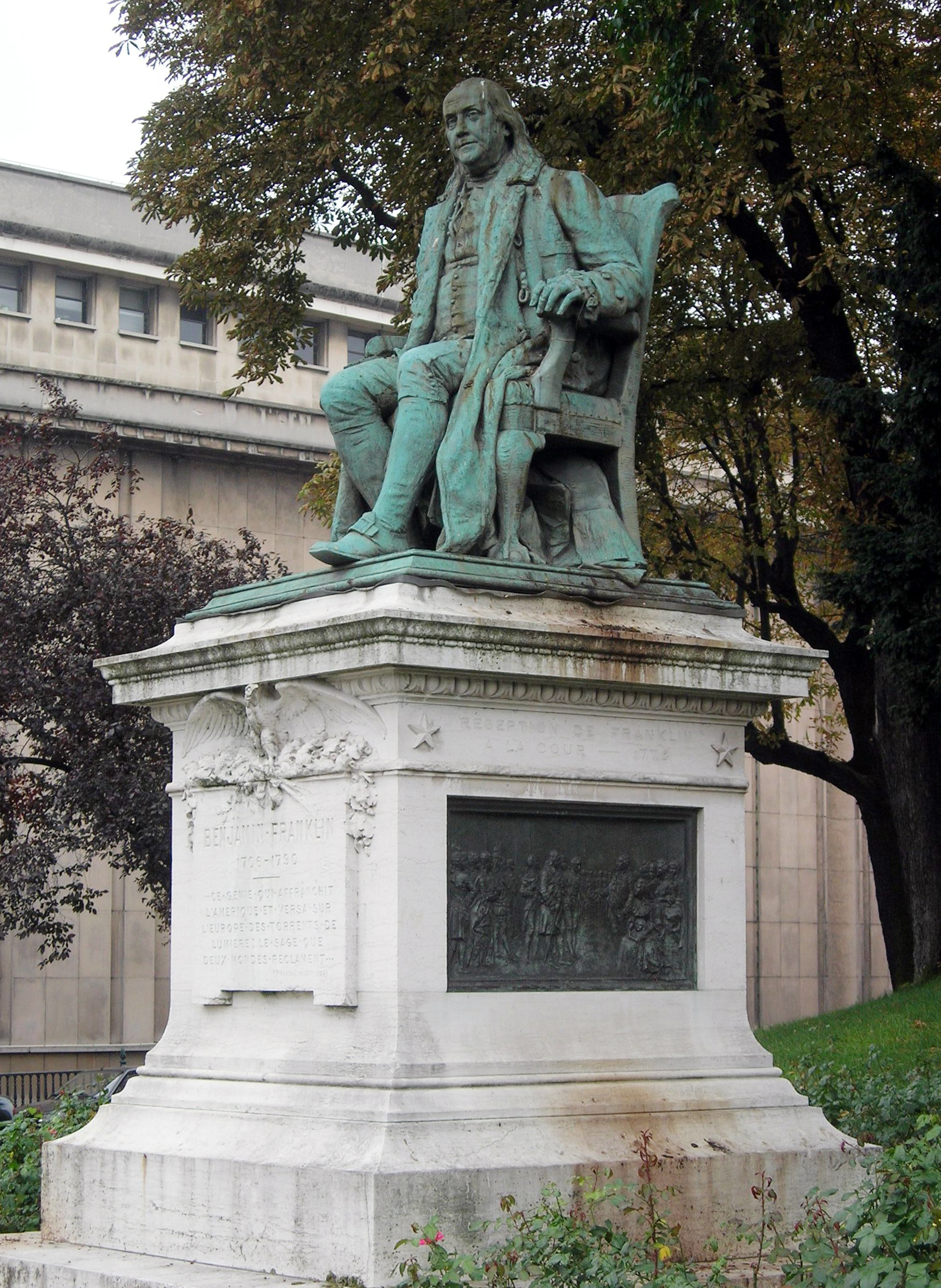
The whole monument
Other works by Brou

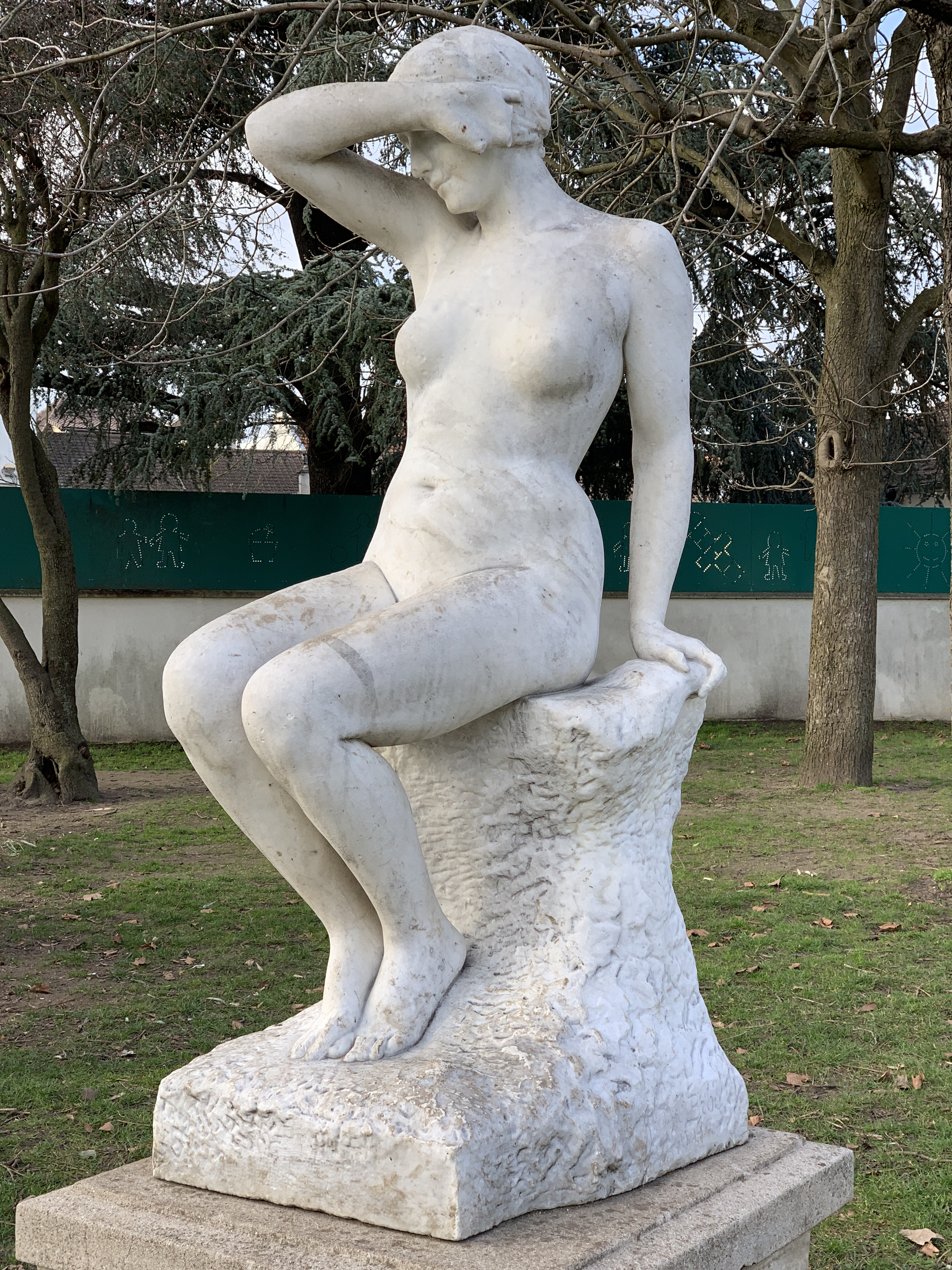
Eve (1899), Saint-Maur-des-Fossés, square Hameln.

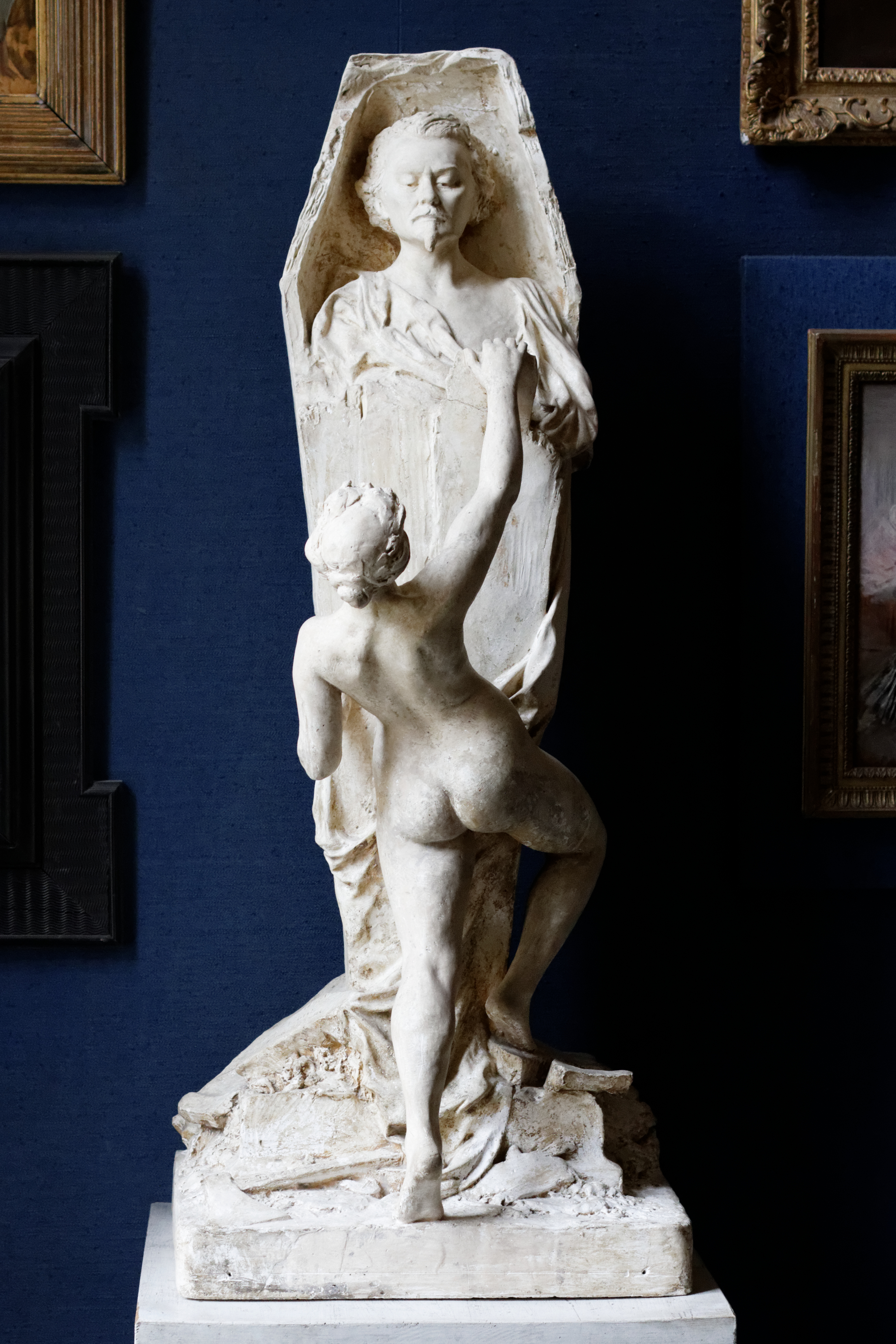
Monument to Villiers de l'Isle Adam (1906), plaster, Paris, musée Carnavalet.

== Bibliography ==
- (in French) Léon Bloy, Lettres à Frédéric Brou et à Jean de la Laurencie, Éditeur Bloud et Gay, 1927.
- Dictionnaire Bénézit entry
