= The Pit and the Pendulum (1964 film) =

- Directed by: Alexandre Astruc
- Screenplay by: Alexandre Astruc
- Based on: The Pit and the Pendulum; 1842 story by Edgar Allan Poe
- Starring: Maurice Ronet
- Cinematography: Nicolas Hayer
- Edited by: Monique Chalmandrier; Sophie Bhaud
- Music by: Antoine Duhamel
- Release date: 9 January 1964
- Running time: 37 minutes
- Country: France
- Language: French

The Pit and the Pendulum (French: Le puits et le pendule) is a 1964 French featurette horror film directed by Alexandre Astruc and starring Maurice Ronet. It tells the story of a prisoner sentenced to death who is tormented by the Spanish Inquisition. The film is based on the 1842 short story with the same title by Edgar Allan Poe.

The film was produced through Radiodiffusion-Télévision Française. It premiered on 9 January 1964.

== Plot ==
Film historian Gordon Gow provides this film summary:

“The screenplay adheres very closely to Poe. During the Spanish Inquisition, a prisoner (Maurice Ronet) is condemned to death. He is thrown into a dark, subterranean room, where he gropes about and discovers that a deep pit yawns in the center of the floor. When unseen eyes observe that he has not stumbled into it, guards enter the dungeon and place him on a low bed, to which he is tied down, supine, the long surcingle wrapped tight across his body [to immobilize him]. Left alone in this position, looking up toward the ceiling, he beholds a descending pendulum with a crescent blade of steel. By slow degrees it swings down toward his defenseless body, gathering momentum as it descends. The prisoner takes some meat from a bowl near the bed and smears the surcingle that binds his chest. This attracts rats. They gnaw through his bonds just in time. He knows at once that his escape has been witnessed by his persecutors, because now the pendulum ascends quickly to the ceiling. The escape is temporary. The iron walls of the dungeon begin to radiate an intense heat. At the same time they move toward him, reducing the size of the room, forcing him to the edge of the pit. The tension is relieved abruptly by the arrival of French troops who have captured Toledo. They set the prisoner free.”

== Cast ==
- Maurice Ronet as Le condamné à mort
