= The Future Eve =

1880 novel by Auguste Villiers de L'Isle-Adam

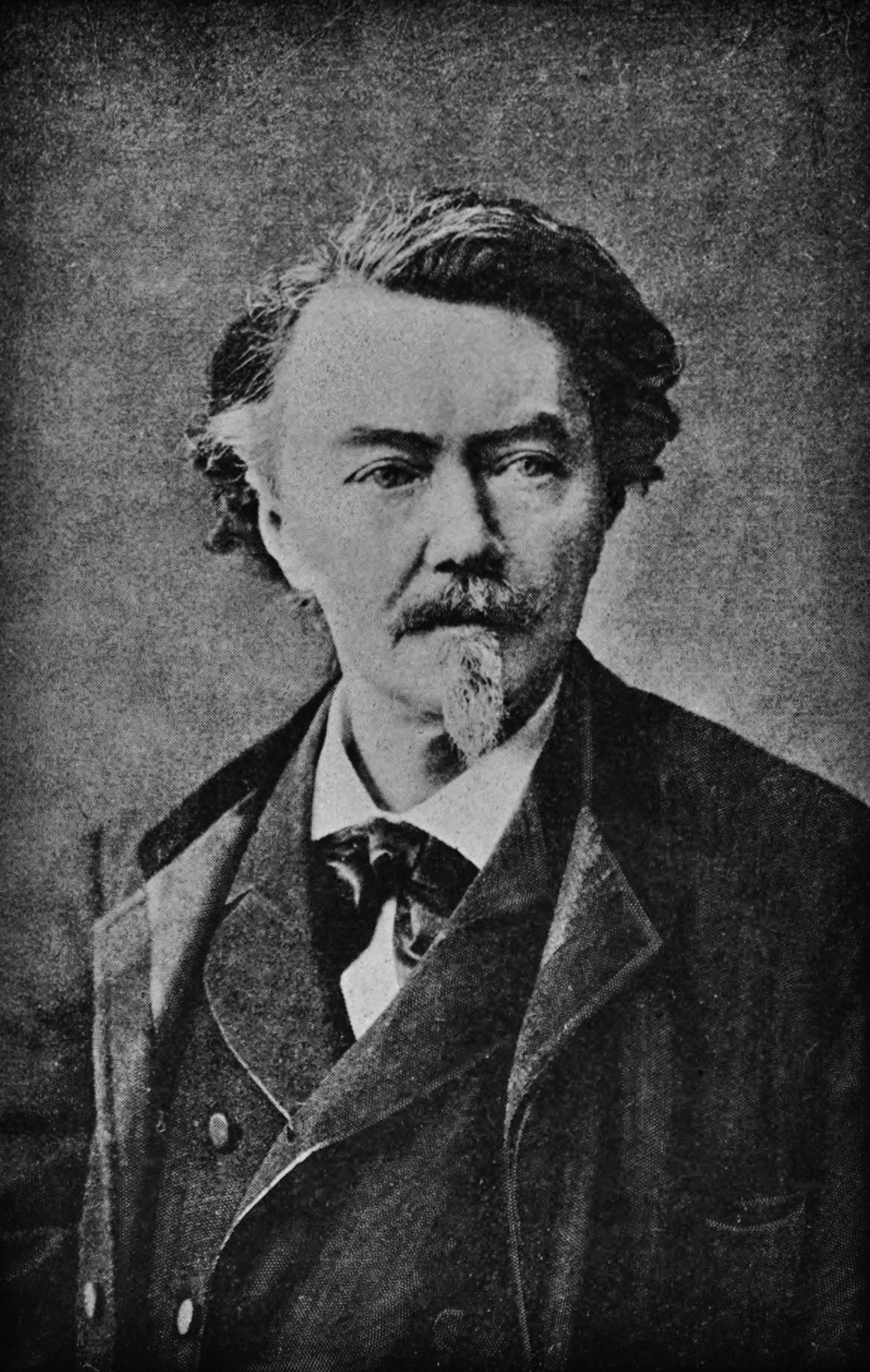
- Author: Auguste Villiers de l'Isle-Adam
- Original title: L'Ève future
- Language: French
- Genre: Science fiction, symbolist
- Publication date: 1880
- Publication place: France
- Media type: Print

The Future Eve (also translated as Tomorrow's Eve and The Eve of the Future; French: L'Ève future) is a symbolist science fiction novel by the French author Auguste Villiers de l'Isle-Adam. Begun in 1878 and originally published in 1880 as L'Ève nouvelle, the novel is known for popularizing the term "Android".

== Plot ==
Villiers opens the novel with his main character, a fictionalized Thomas Edison, contemplating the effects of his inventions on the world and the tragedy that they were not available until he invented them. Interrupted in his reverie, Edison receives a message from his friend Lord Ewald, who saved his life some years before and to whom he feels indebted.

When Ewald calls, he reveals that he is close to suicide because of his fiancée, Miss Alicia Clary. Alicia is described as being physically perfect but emotionally and intellectually empty. She will say whatever she believes others want to hear. Far from having any ambition or goals of her own, she lives her life based on what she believes is expected of her. Ewald describes his frustration with the disparity between her appearance and her self and confides that though he can have no other, she is so hopeless that he has resolved to kill himself.

Edison replies by offering to construct for Ewald a machine-woman in the form of Alicia but without any of her bothersome personality. He shows Ewald the prototype of the Android, named Hadaly, and Ewald is intrigued and accepts Edison's offer. Edison reveals that he has invited Alicia to his residence at Menlo Park in order to set the process in motion. He then explains to the still somewhat doubtful Ewald how he will interact with the Android and how natural it will all feel.

Ewald then presses Edison to tell him why he created Hadaly in the first place. Edison relates a long story about Mr. Edward Anderson who was tempted into infidelity by a young woman named Miss Evelyn. His indiscretion, brought about by the guile of Miss Evelyn, ruins his life completely. Edison then says that he tracked down Miss Evelyn only to discover that she was not as she appeared, rather she was horribly ugly and her beauty was entirely the work of cosmetics, wigs, and other accessories. Edison created Hadaly in an effort to overcome the flaws and artificiality of real women and create a perfect and natural woman who could bring a man true happiness. Edison then takes Ewald back to Hadaly and explains to him the exact mechanical details of her functioning: how she moves and talks and breathes and bathes, all the while explaining how natural and normal Hadaly's robotic needs are, comparing them to similar human actions and functions.

After the details of the android's functioning and construction are covered, Alicia arrives and is escorted in. Edison convinces her that she is being considered for an important theater role. Over the course of the next weeks, she poses for Edison and her exact physical likeness is duplicated and recordings of her voice are made. Eventually, Edison sends Alicia away and introduces Ewald to his artificial Alicia without revealing that it is not the real thing. Ewald is very taken with her and she secretly reveals to him that she is in fact not simply an Android but has been supernaturally endowed with the spirit of Sowana, Edison's mystical assistant. Ewald does not reveal this fact to Edison but instead leaves with Hadaly-Alicia-Sowana. However, before he can reach home to his new life with his new lover, Ewald's ship sinks and the Android, who was traveling with the cargo, is destroyed.

== Characters ==
- Thomas Edison
- Lord Ewald
- Alicia, Ewald's fiancée
- Hadaly, a mechanical woman constructed by Edison
- Sowana, Edison's mystical assistant
- Mr. Anderson, a former acquaintance of Edison's
- Miss Evelyn, a young woman who seduces Mr. Anderson
- Mrs. Anderson, Mr. Anderson's wife

== Criticism ==
The Future Eve has been called equally stunning for its literary experimentation and its virulent misogyny. It has also been discussed as a key text in the Decadent movement, as a vital commentary on social and cultural ideas of "hysteria" in relation to the work of Jean-Martin Charcot, and as an important work of 19th-century science fiction. The narrative nucleus of the novel, in which Edison dissects the female android Hadaly, has been discussed as a critical link between the spectatorial Gaze cultivated within the Anatomical theatre of the Renaissance and that of cinema.

== English translations ==
- "The Future Eve", trans. Florence Crewe-Jones. Serialised in Argosy All-Story Weekly between 18 December 1926 and 22 January 1927.
- Eve of the Future Eden, trans. Marilyn Gaddis Rose (Coronado Press, 1981)
- Tomorrow's Eve, trans. Robert Martin Adams (University of Illinois Press, 1982)

== In popular culture ==
Mamoru Oshii's film Ghost in the Shell 2: Innocence opens with a quote from The Future Eve. "If our gods and hopes are nothing but scientific phenomena, then it must be said that our love is scientific as well." Also a major influence on the Parasite Eve novel, film and video games; Hadaly is also the model designation of the gynoids at the centre of the film.

Is the inspiration for the robotics club in the manga Keep Your Hands Off Eizouken! (Ch. 8).

== See also ==
- Edisonade
- The Empire of Corpses
