= An Evening of Edgar Allan Poe =

1970 television film directed by Kenneth Johnson

- DVD cover
- Based on: "The Tell-Tale Heart" "The Sphinx" "The Cask of Amontillado" "The Pit and the Pendulum" by Edgar Allan Poe
- Written by: David Welch; Ken Johnson
- Directed by: Ken Johnson
- Narrated by: Vincent Price
- Music by: Les Baxter
- Country of origin: United States
- Original language: English

Production
- Producer: Ken Johnson
- Cinematography: Jack Denton
- Editor: Jerry Greene
- Running time: 53 minutes
- Production companies: American International Pictures; Ken Johnson Productions

Original release
- Release: January 1, 1970

An Evening of Edgar Allan Poe is a 1970 film which features Vincent Price reciting four of Edgar Allan Poe's stories, directed by Kenneth Johnson, with music by Les Baxter.

The stories included are: "The Tell-Tale Heart", "The Sphinx", "The Cask of Amontillado" and "The Pit and the Pendulum".

== See also ==
- List of American films of 1970
