= Edith Birkhead =

Edith Birkhead (1889–1951) was a lecturer in English Literature at the University of Bristol and a Noble Fellow at the University of Liverpool. She wrote a pioneering work on Gothic literature: The Tale of Terror (1921). This work described the fascination with supernatural fiction in English literature from the publication of Horace Walpole's The Castle of Otranto in 1764 to Charles Maturin's Melmoth the Wanderer in 1820 on to modern times. She included works from Europe as well as America, including Nathaniel Hawthorne and Edgar Allan Poe.

== Works ==
- Imagery and style in Shelley. Liverpool: University of Liverpool, 1912.
- The Tale of Terror: A Study of the Gothic Romance. London: Constable, 1921.
- "Sentiment and Sensibility in the Eighteenth Century Novel". Essays and Studies of the English Association, 11. Oxford: Clarendon Press, 1925.
- Christina Rossetti and Her Poetry. London: Harrap, 1930.
