= Torture chamber =

Room where torture is inflicted

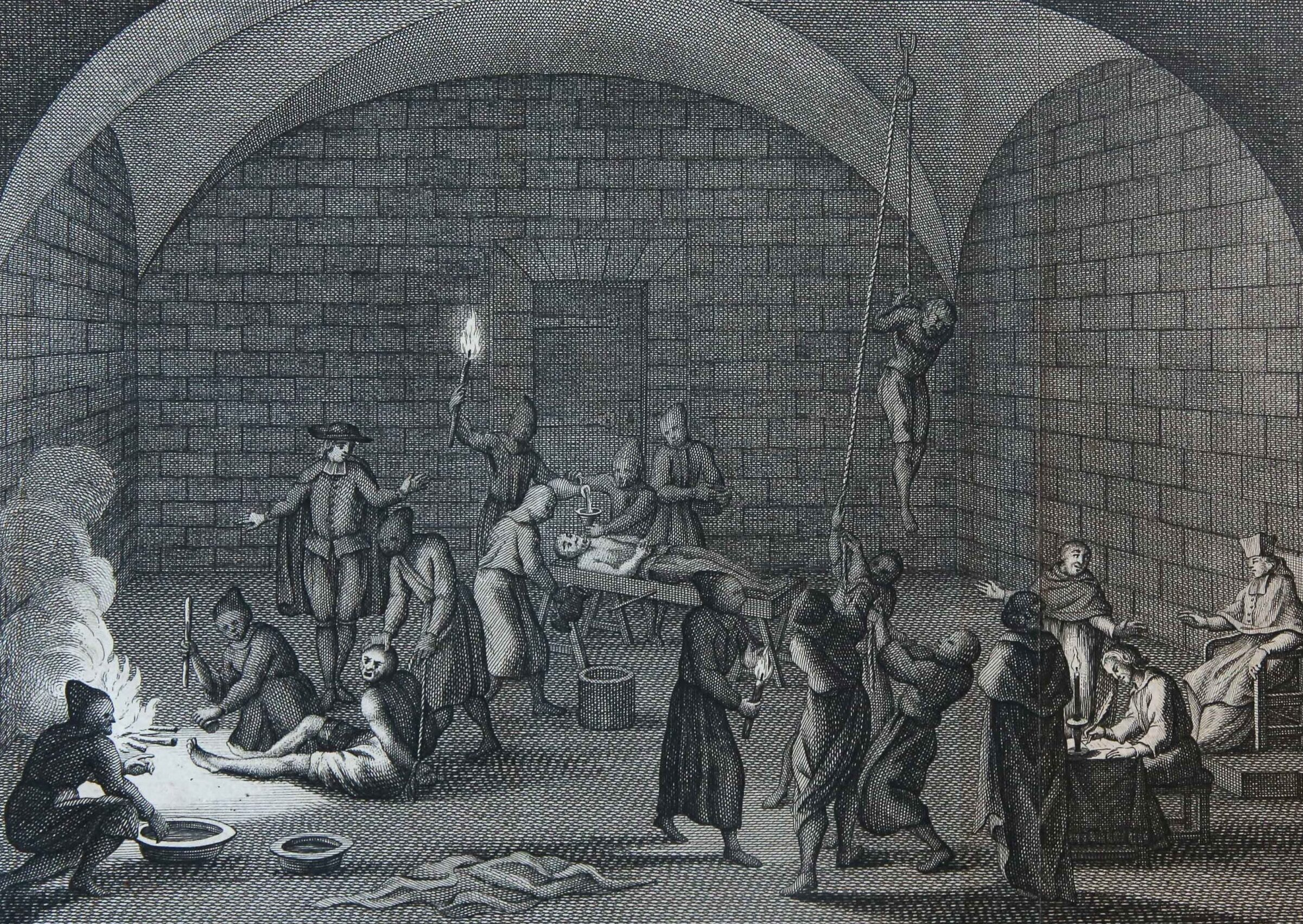
An artist's depiction of a torture chamber of the Inquisition, ca. 1736. The Inquisitors and the clerk are seen on the right. The Inquisitors were present to hear the confession, as soon as the torture victim gave up resisting, and the clerk recorded it. The strappado i.e. the rope and pulley system through which the victims, having their hands tied behind their backs and the lifting rope attached to their wrists, were raised and then lowered violently from the chamber ceiling, is visible on the right.

A torture chamber is a room equipped, and sometimes specially constructed, for the infliction of torture. The medieval torture chamber was windowless and often built underground, dimly lit and specifically designed to induce horror, dread and despair.

Historically, torture chambers were located in royal palaces, in castles of the nobility and even buildings belonging to the church. They featured secret trap-doors which could be activated to throw victims into dark dungeons where they remained and eventually died. The skeletal remains of people who disappeared were strewn on the floor of the hidden dungeons. Other times the dungeons under the trap-doors included pits of water where the victim was thrown to drown after a lengthy torture session in the chamber above.

In Peru, the torture chambers of the Spanish Inquisition were specifically constructed with thick walls so that the screams of the victims could not penetrate them and no sound could be heard from the outside. Other more sophisticated designs used principles of acoustics to muffle the screams of the tortured and included walls which recessed and protruded in such a fashion as to reflect the screams of the victims so that the sounds would not be carried to the exterior.

The mere presence of the torture chamber was used as a form of intimidation and coercion. The victims were first shown the chamber and if they confessed they would not be tortured inside it. Other times the torture chamber was used as the final destination in a series of prison cells where the victims would gradually be moved from one type of cell to another, under progressively worsening conditions of incarceration, and if they did not recant in the earlier stages they would finally reach the torture chamber. The final stage of actually going to the torture chamber itself, just prior to the initiation of torture, was euphemistically called the "Question".

== History ==
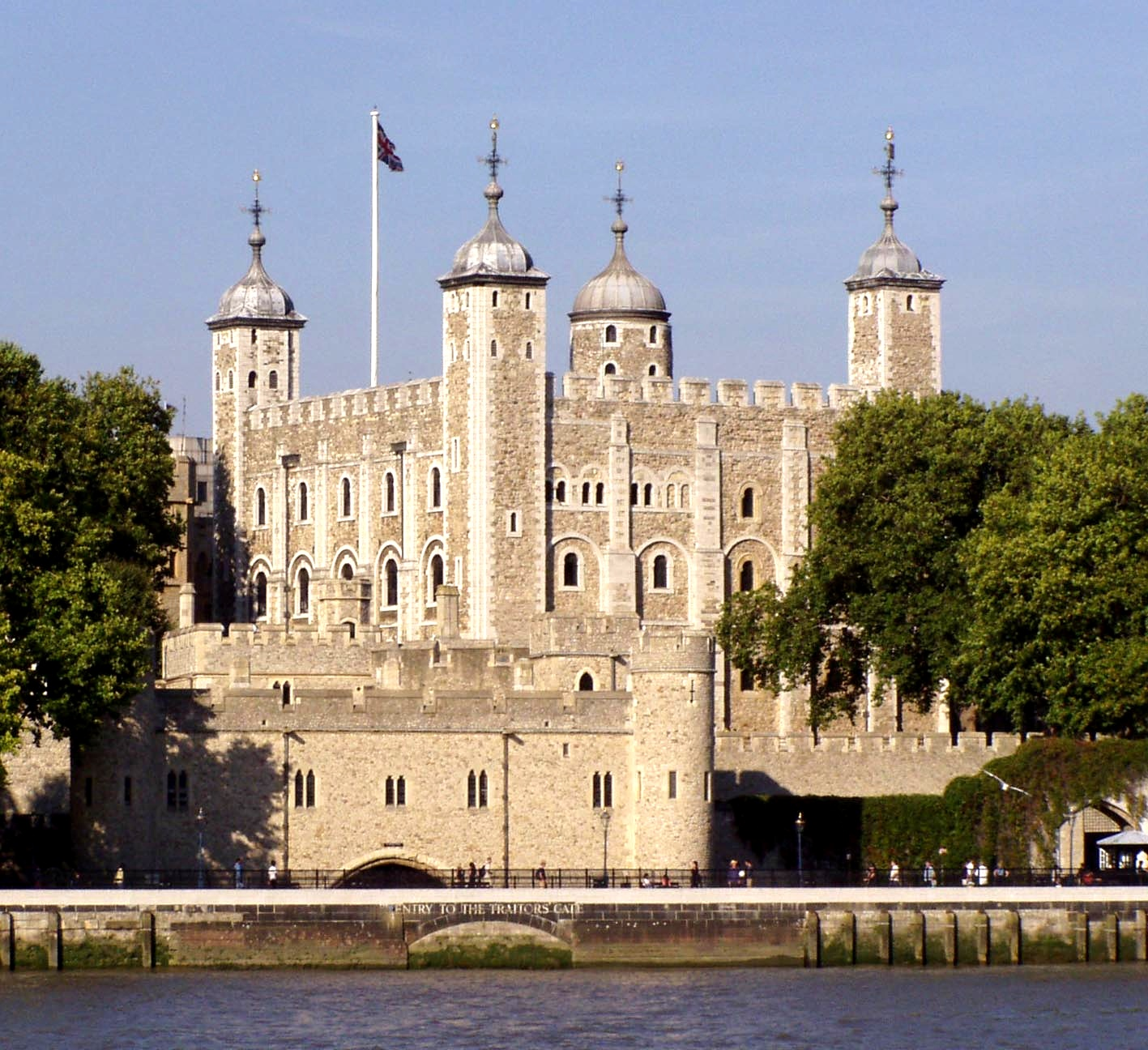
The Tower of London and Traitor's Gate. In the Middle Ages and into the Tudor and Stuart periods, torture was carried out in its chambers

Throughout history, torture chambers have been used in a multiplicity of ways starting from Roman times. Torture chamber use during the Middle Ages was frequent. Religious, social and political persecution led to the widespread use of torture during that time. Torture chambers were also used during the Spanish Inquisition and at the Tower of London.

Another example of a torture chamber, perhaps not generally well known, is "The Thieves' Tower" in the Alsace region of France. Once a tower used for torture, it is now a small museum displaying instruments used upon the prisoners to get them to confess crimes.

In Venice, the Palazzo Ducale had its own torture chamber, which was deemed to be of such importance that renovations started in 1507 so that the chamber walls could be kept strong and secure.

=== Ashoka's Hell ===
According to the narrations of Ashokavadana, King Ashoka, prior to his conversion to Buddhism, was a fierce and sadistic ruler, known as Ashoka the Fierce, who built a palatial torture chamber known as Ashoka's Hell. The legend of the torture palace is detailed in the writings of the Ashokavadana.

According to Ashokavadana, Ashoka asked Girika, who was the official executioner of his kingdom, to design an elaborate torture chamber disguised as a beautiful and "enticing" palace adorned with all kinds of decorations and full of amenities such as exclusive baths decorated with flowers, fruit trees and many ornaments. It was artfully designed to make people long to just look at it.

According to legend, beneath the veneer of beauty deep inside the exclusive mansion, torture chambers were constructed which were full of the most sadistic and cruel instruments of torture including furnaces producing molten metal.

According to the accounts contained in the Ashokavadana, Girika, the architect of the chamber, was inspired by descriptions of the five tortures of the Buddhist hell for the design of the torture chamber and of the torture methods he inflicted upon his victims. The torture chamber was so terrifying, that King Ashoka himself was thought to have visited hell so that he could perfect its evil design.

Ashoka made Girika promise that he would never allow anyone who entered the palace to exit alive, including Ashoka himself. In the Biographical Sutra of King Ashoka the palace is described by the sentence: 'King Ashoka constructed a hell'.

Some time later a Buddhist monk by the name of Samudra happened to visit the palace and upon entering he was informed by Girika that he would be tortured to death, and was subsequently led into the torture chamber. His torturers however failed to injure him and he appeared able to neutralise their torture methods by performing miracles.

Ashoka converted to Buddhism when he witnessed Samudra's miracles inside the torture chamber. He also ordered Girika burned alive and ordered the demolition of the torture palace. According to the Ashokavadana, "the beautiful jail was then torn down and a guarantee of security was extended to all beings".

Xuanzang in his writings mentions that in the 7th century AD he had visited the place where Ashoka's Hell once was. In India the palace is known as "Ashoka's Hell" and its location near Pataliputra became a popular destination for pilgrims. Faxian also reports visiting it and his account of the story of the palace differs slightly from that of Xuanzang's.

=== Inquisition ===
==== Methods of coercion ====
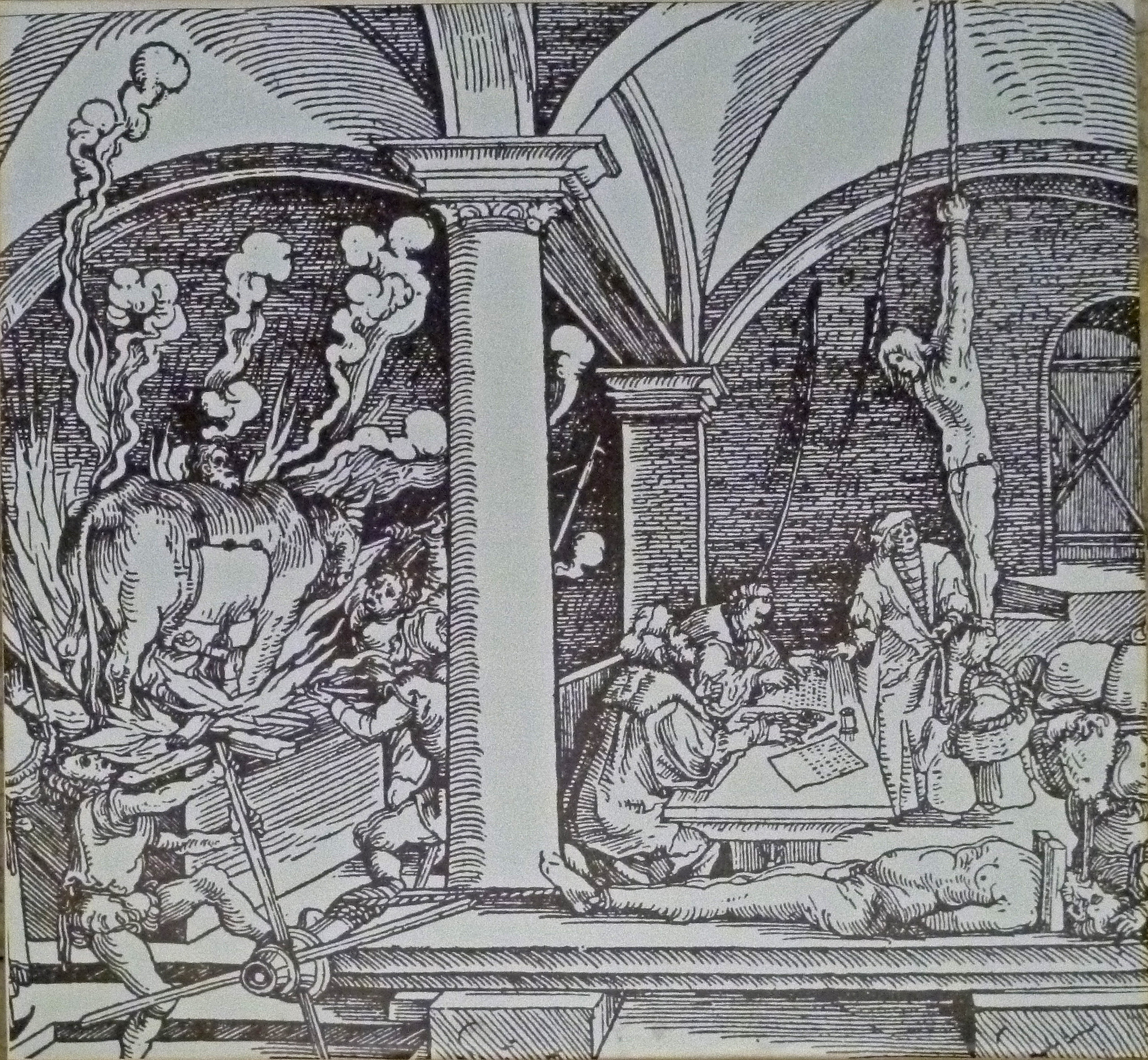
Artist's depiction of the strappado, including the weight hanging from the victim's ankles. On the left the Brazen bull is illustrated

According to Frederick Howard Wines in his book Punishment and Reformation: A Study of the Penitentiary System there were three main types of coercion employed in the torture chamber: coercion by cord, water, or fire. There were five stages of torture that could have been applied to the accused: he could have been threatened with torture, he could have been taken to the torture chamber and been shown the instruments, he could have been undressed as if in preparation to be tied to the instrument; without actually being tied, he could have been tied to the instrument of torture but not actually have it inflicted and finally he could have been tied to the instrument and tortured.

The process of being tied and led to the torture rack inside the torture chamber was a form of intimidation and was called territio realis as opposed to territio verbalis oder lexis which was the verbal threat of torture being made at the judgment hall. Territio realis as well as the actual torture session were called examen rigorosum.

In the book Crime and Criminal Justice in Europe and Canada it is mentioned that fear was a factor in the process of torture and that there was a form of torture known as La présentation de la question or simply the "Question", where the prisoner was led to the torture chamber and was shown the implements of torture. While at the chamber, sentence to full torture was pronounced but, immediately after, the prisoner was taken back to the prison cell, without actually having been tortured.

The torture chamber was specifically designed to evoke fear in the victims. It was usually built underground and only dimly lit. Inside the chamber waited the executioner, his face completely covered apart from two holes in the garment to enable him to peer through and wearing a black hood; his menacing appearance being described as "most diabolical" and "satanic".

When during the Question, the view of the chamber, the torture implements and the executioner did not cause the victim to confess, a full-scale torture session was planned. To prepare for torture, the victim was stripped naked with hands tied. The penultimate step to torture included a repetition of the questions asked earlier of the victims. If the victims still proclaimed their innocence, full torture was initiated.

The most common instrument of torture was the strappado, which was a simple rope and pulley system. With the pulley attached to ceiling of the chamber, the lifting rope was tied to the wrist of the victim, whose hands were tied behind their back. Subsequently, the victim was raised to the ceiling and then lowered using a jerking motion causing dislocation of the shoulder joints. To increase the suffering caused by the strappado, weights were attached to the feet of the victim.

Church doctrine protected human life so it was problematic if a victim were to die, especially before he or she confessed. In difficult cases, when a victim would not readily confess or was too weak to continue in an uninterrupted torture session, breaks were allowed between torture sessions because Inquisition regulations allowed only one torture session per victim. That way, a torture session could resume after a break to allow time for the victim to recover or reconsider his or her opposition to confessing, and it was considered to have been the continuation of the previous torture session and not a new one.

Because confession under torture was not acceptable, the victim had to sign a written confession after making an oral confession under torture. Typically, during confession, the inquisitors demanded that the prisoner implicate as many people as possible and not only him or herself. If the prisoner resisted signing, the inquisitors could always resume the torture by claiming that they had just halted the session, just for the signing, but did not really put an end to it.

==== Construction ====
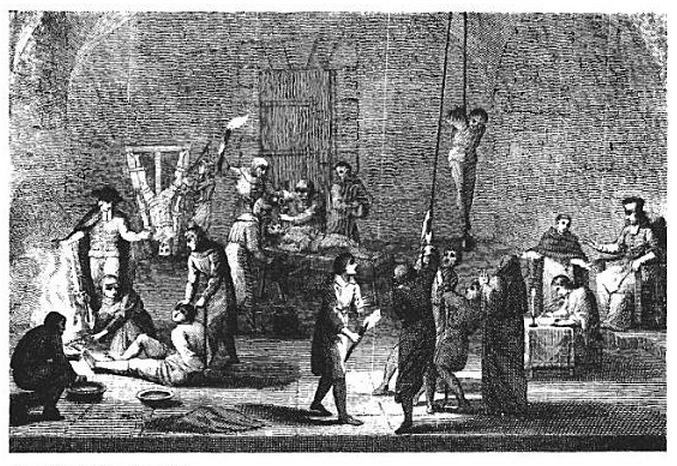
An artist's depiction of a Torture chamber of the Inquisition, ca. 1809 from Moore's Martyrology.

The method of construction of the torture chamber of the papal palace at Avignon, used during the Inquisition, has been described as ingenious. The construction of some of the torture chambers at Avignon was based on principles of acoustics, specifically designed to muffle the screams and cries of the tortured. The walls of the torture chamber recessed and protruded in a complementary fashion to the walls on the opposite side so as to reflect the screams of the victims locally, ensuring that their shrieks would not be carried to the exterior. A chamber located above the main torture chamber had a dungeon with a hole near the middle of the floor through which, according to accounts, the tortured bodies of the prisoners were thrown into a cavity. The chamber where the victims were being burnt was of circular construction and resembled the furnace of a glass-house with a funnel-like chimney at the top.

There were secret staircases and hidden spaces which were used to overhear the discussions in the prison cells. The ceiling of the torture chamber was especially designed to muffle the cries of the victims. Inside the torture chamber, furnaces and grates were also present. Up to 1850 the chambers were shown to visitors after which time the ecclesiastical authorities of Avignon decided to shut them down. In a similar vein the torture chamber of the Spanish Inquisition in Lima, Peru had one metre thick walls so that the screams of the victims could not penetrate them.

In Nuremberg and Salzburg the torture chambers featured trapdoors on their floors. In Nuremberg the room underneath the main torture chamber featured torture machinery while in Salzburg, the room under the trapdoor, functioned like a waiting room for prisoners. When the time came the prisoner was pulled up and into the upper torture chamber. Other times, deep water pits could be found under the trapdoor, where the victims of the torture chamber could be thrown, after a torture session, to drown.

==== Palace of the Inquisition ====
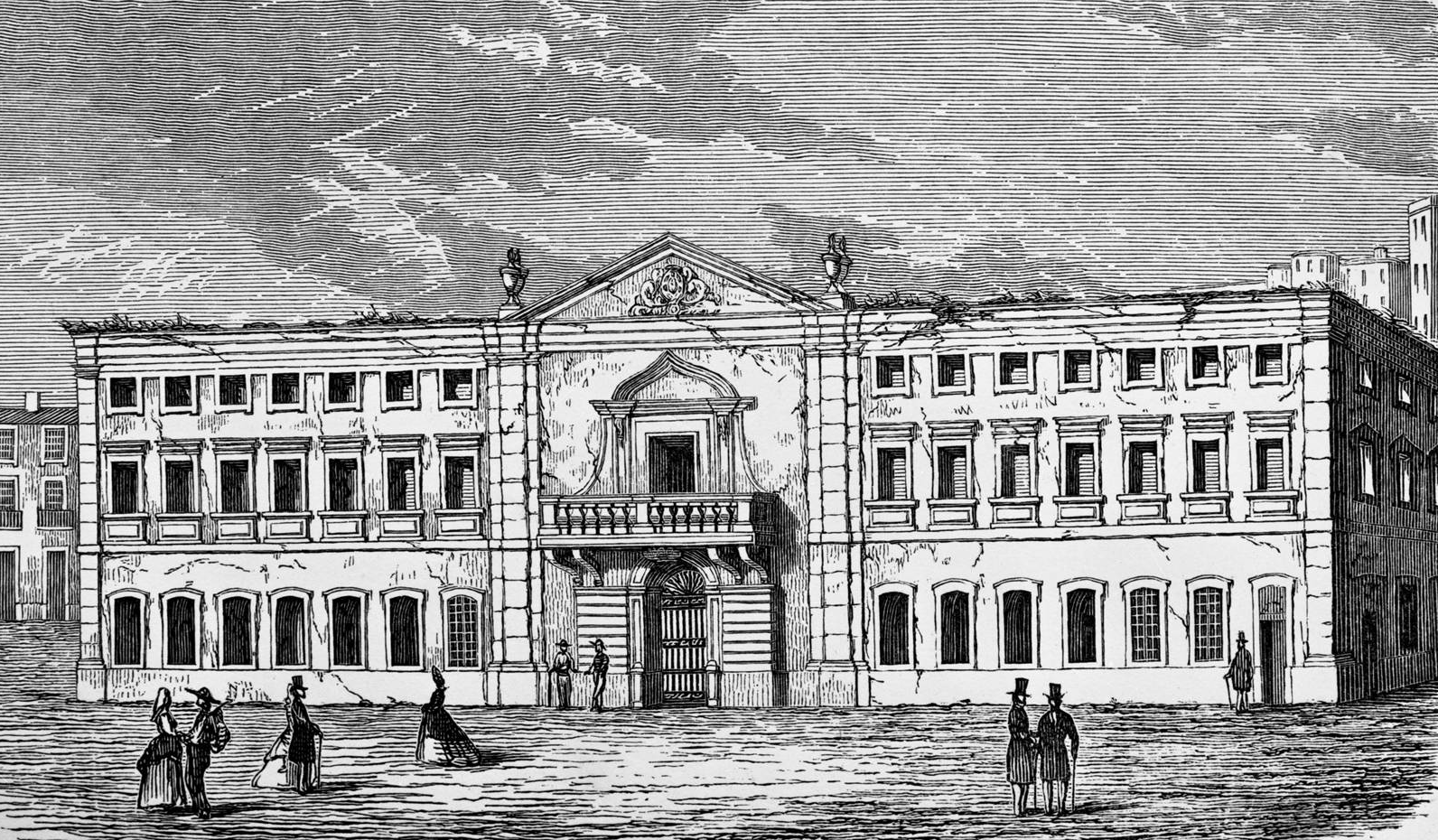
Palace of the Inquisition in Lisbon, Portugal

The torture chamber was the final destination in a progression of four cell types during incarceration at the Palace of the Inquisition. The palace contained the Judgement Hall, the offices of the employees, the private apartments of the Grand Inquisitor and the detention cells adjacent to the apartments. The detention cell gradations started with the cells of mercy reserved mainly for rich transgressors who upon bequeathing all their property to the Inquisition were normally let go after a time of detention in the cells.

For more difficult prisoners the next cell stage was the cell of penitence. These were situated in small round towers of about 3 metres (ten feet) in diameter. They were painted white and included rudimentary furniture such as a stool and a bed. Very little light was allowed in. If the prisoner did not cooperate, the next step in the detention process was the dungeon. The dungeon had walls 1.5 metres (five feet) thick, double doors and was in complete darkness. No conversation of any type was allowed in the dungeon. The food allowance for prisoners was less than a penny a day including the profit of the warden while any human refuse was removed every four days. After a stay in the dungeon, uncooperative prisoners were moved to their final destination: the torture chamber.

==== Palace of Inquisition in Cartagena ====
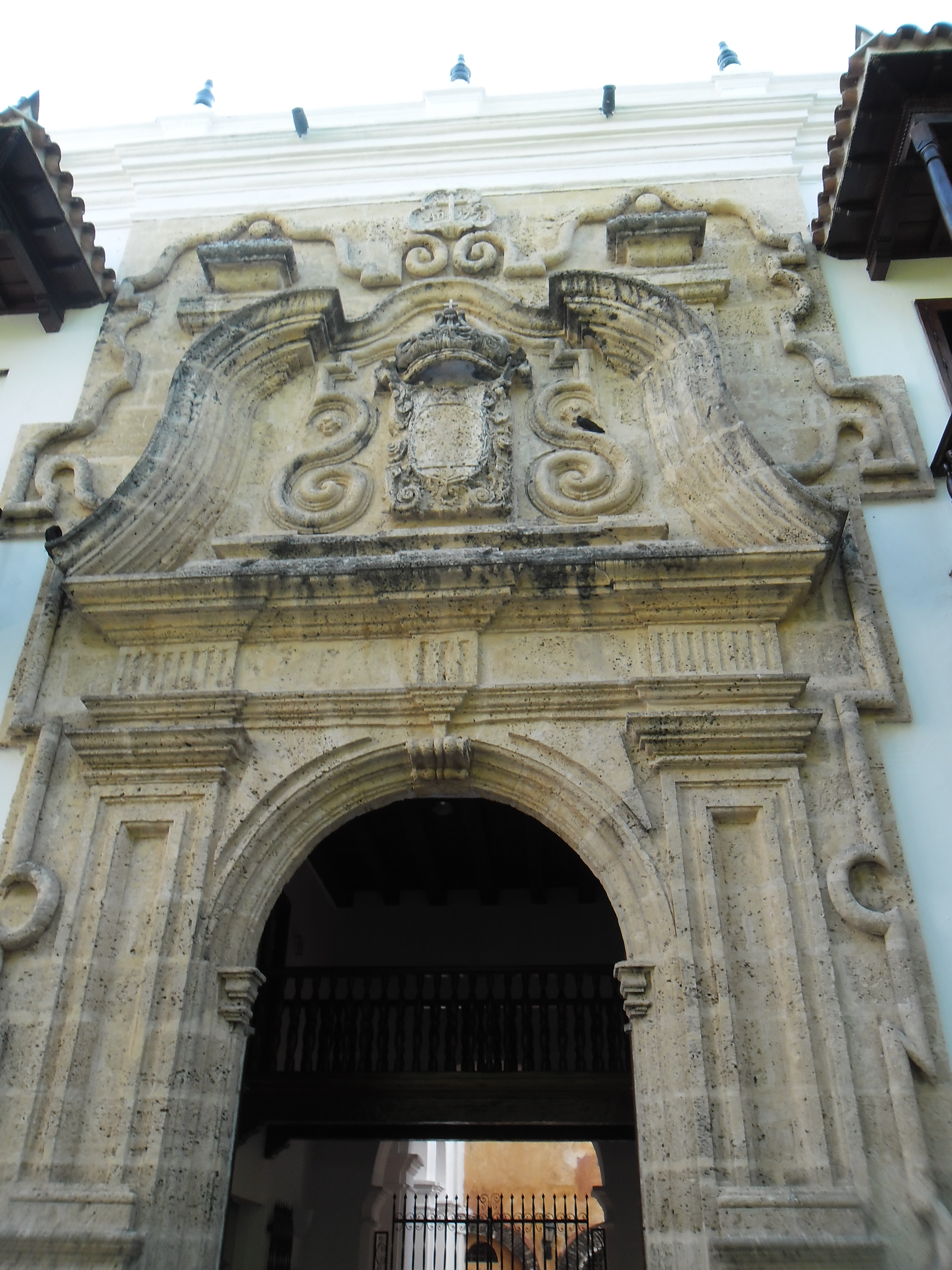
Entrance to the Palace of Inquisition at Cartagena

The Palace of Inquisition was a torture chamber in Cartagena, Colombia, built under orders of Philip III, which served as headquarters for the Spanish Inquisition. It was used to torture Jews and other non-Catholics. Approximately 800 individuals were put to death there.

== Modern times ==
=== Nazi Germany ===
The traditional torture users of modern times have been dictatorship governments e.g. the Nazis, Argentine military junta (at the Navy School of Mechanics), and the Chilean dictatorship led by Augusto Pinochet as well as other South American regimes.

=== South America ===
In Chile, during the Pinochet dictatorship, the use of converted locker-rooms and skyboxes as torture chambers has been reported. The Esmeralda, a training ship of the Chilean Navy had also been used as a "floating torture chamber" during Pinochet's dictatorship. In 2011, protests erupted in Vancouver, Canada, upon a visit by the Esmeralda. In Santiago, Chile, Villa Grimaldi, once a cultural center, was used as a torture centre which included torture chambers. A tour of Villa Grimaldi has been described as a "tour of barbarity" featuring exhibits with descriptive signs such as "Place of hangings", "Torture chamber", "Annex torture chamber", "Women's cells 1x1 meter", "The Grill: Electric Beds" and others.

Michelle Bachelet, who later became president of Chile, was tortured in a torture chamber during the Pinochet years. After the fall of Pinochet, the torture chamber victims and the relatives of the desaparecidos refused to strike a deal with Pinochet or with the politicians that followed him.

=== Europe ===
Use of torture chambers was also reported in Europe during the Greek military junta years (1967–1974). Alexandros Panagoulis and Army Major Spyros Moustaklis are examples of people tortured at the EAT/ESA (Greek Military Police) interrogation cell units.

=== Middle East ===
Under his reign (1979–2003), Saddam Hussein reportedly tortured those whom he deemed as a threat. After the invasion of Iraq by U.S. forces, pictures of dead Iraqis, with their necks slashed, their eyes gouged out and their genitals blackened, were located in many torture chambers. Jail cells, with dried blood on the floor and rusted shackles bolted to the walls, lined the corridors.

In November 2004, U.S. Marines found a number of torture rooms in Fallujah by following trails of dried blood, or the smell of dead bodies. Some rooms were hidden behind fake walls, or concealed in basements. Libyans have entered abandoned torture chambers and found devices that have been used against opposition members in the past.

=== United States ===
The CIA has been found to torture prisoners at black sites around the world.

=== Russia ===
In April 2022, evidence of the brutal mass rape and massacre by Russian forces of the residents of the Ukrainian town of Bucha came to light. Soldiers of the Ukrainian Territorial Defense Forces said they had found eighteen mutilated bodies of men, women, and children in a summer camp's basement in Zabuchchya, near Bucha. Footage released by the Ukrainian army appeared to show a torture chamber in the basement. One of the soldiers said that some of the bodies had cut-off ears or pulled out teeth, and that the bodies had been removed a day before the interview. Corpses of other killed civilians were left in the road. An investigation by Radio Free Europe/Radio Liberty verified that the basement was used as an "execution cellar" by Russian forces.

== See also ==
- Black site
- Extraordinary rendition
- Iron maiden
- Medieval instruments of torture
- Palace of Inquisition
- Psychological warfare
- The Box (torture)

== Books ==
- Joseph Anthony Amato; David Monge (November 1990). Victims and values: a history and a theory of suffering. Greenwood Press. ISBN 978-0-313-25903-6.
- Guida Billingue all mostra di Strumenti di Tortura Chamber dal Medioeve all Epoca Industriale. By Roberto Held. Florence, Qua d' Arno 1983.
- "The Iron Shroud" by William Mudford, a short story, published also as a chapbook, about an iron torture chamber which shrinks through mechanical action and eventually crushes the victim inside. Edgar Allan Poe is considered to have been influenced by Mudford's story when he wrote The Pit and the Pendulum.
