= List of animated short films of the 1960s =

Films are sorted by year and then alphabetically. They include theatrical, television, and direct-to-video films with less than 40 minutes runtime. For a list of films with over 40 minutes of runtime, see List of animated feature films of the 1960s.

== 1960 ==
Name	Country	Technique
An Award for Mr. Rossi	Italy	Traditional Animation
Ballyhooey	United States	Traditional Animation
Bats in the Belfry	United States	Traditional Animation
Be Mice to Cats	United States	Traditional Animation
Billion Dollar Boner	United States	Traditional Animation
The Boss Is Always Right	United States	Traditional Animation
Bouncing Benny	United States	Traditional Animation
Busy Buddies	United States	Traditional Animation
Counter Attack	United States	Traditional Animation
Crockett-Doodle-Do	United States	Traditional Animation
Disguise the Limit	United States	Traditional Animation
The Dixie Fryer	United States	Traditional Animation
Dog Gone People	United States	Traditional Animation
Electronica	United States	Traditional Animation
Fastest with the Mostest	United States	Traditional Animation
Fiddle Faddle	United States	Traditional Animation
Fine Feathered Friend	United States	Traditional Animation
Fiogīŝtra Astra	Latvia	Hand-drawn/live-action/stop-motion/puppet
Fish Hooked	United States	Traditional Animation
Fowled Up Falcon	United States	Traditional Animation
From Dime to Dime	United States	Traditional Animation
From Hare to Heir	United States	Traditional Animation
Galaxia	United States	Traditional Animation
Goldimouse and the Three Cats	United States	Traditional Animation
Goliath II	United States	Traditional Animation
Heap Big Hepcat	United States	Traditional Animation
High Note	United States	Traditional Animation
Hopalong Casualty	United States	Traditional Animation
Horse Hare	United States	Traditional Animation
How to Stuff a Woodpecker	United States	Traditional Animation
Hyde and Go Tweet	United States	Traditional Animation
Lighter Than Hare	United States	Traditional Animation
Mice Follies	United States	Traditional Animation
Miceniks	United States	Traditional Animation
Mike the Masquerader	United States	Traditional Animation
Monkey Doodles	United States	Traditional Animation
Mouse and Garden	United States	Traditional Animation
Munro	Czechoslovakia, United States	Traditional Animation
Northern Mites	United States	Traditional Animation
Ozark Lark	United States	Traditional Animation
Peck Your Own Home	United States	Traditional Animation
Person to Bunny	United States	Traditional Animation
Pistol Packin' Woodpecker	United States	Traditional Animation
The Planet Mouseola	United States	Traditional Animation
Rabbit's Feat	United States	Traditional Animation
Ready, Woolen and Able	United States	Traditional Animation
Scouting for Trouble	United States	Traditional Animation
The Shoe Must Go On	United States	Traditional Animation
Shootin' Stars	United States	Traditional Animation
Silly Science	United States	Traditional Animation
Southern Fried Hospitality	United States	Traditional Animation
A Tale of Old Whiff	United States	Traditional Animation
Terry the Terror	United States	Traditional Animation
Three Tales	Japan	Anime
Top Cat	United States	Traditional Animation
Trigger Treat	United States	Traditional Animation
Trip for Tat	United States	Traditional Animation
Trouble Date	United States	Traditional Animation
Turning the Fables	United States	Traditional Animation
West of the Pesos	United States	Traditional Animation
Who Scent You?	United States	Traditional Animation
Wild Wild World	United States	Traditional Animation

== 1961 ==
Name	Country	Technique
The Abominable Snow Rabbit	United States	Traditional Animation
Alvin's Solo Flight	United States	Traditional Animation
Aquamania	United States	Traditional Animation
Beep Prepared	United States	Traditional Animation
The Bird Who Came to Dinner	United States	Traditional Animation
Birds of a Father	United States	Traditional Animation
Busman's Holiday	United States	Traditional Animation
Cane and Able	United States	Traditional Animation
Cannery Woe	United States	Traditional Animation
Cape Kidnaveral	United States	Traditional Animation
Cat Alarm	United States	Traditional Animation
Clash and Carry	United States	Traditional Animation
Compressed Hare	United States	Traditional Animation
Cool Cat Blues	United States	Traditional Animation
Cipollino	Soviet Union	Traditional Animation
D' Fightin' Ones	United States	Traditional Animation
Daffy's Inn Trouble	United States	Traditional Animation
Donald and the Wheel	United States	Traditional Animation
Down and Outing	United States	Traditional Animation
Franken-Stymied	United States	Traditional Animation
Gabby's Diner	United States	Traditional Animation
Goodie the Gremlin	United States	Traditional Animation
Hoppy Daze	United States	Traditional Animation
Hound About That	United States	Traditional Animation
In the Nicotine	United States	Traditional Animation
The Inquisit Visit	United States	Traditional Animation
It's Greek to Me-ow!	United States	Traditional Animation
The Kid from Mars	United States	Traditional Animation
Kozmo Goes to School	United States	Traditional Animation
The Last Hungry Cat	United States	Traditional Animation
Lickety-Splat	United States	Traditional Animation
The Lion's Busy	United States	Traditional Animation
The Litterbug	United States	Traditional Animation
The Mighty Termite	United States	Traditional Animation
The Mouse on 57th Street	United States	Traditional Animation
The Mysterious Package	United States	Traditional Animation
Nelly's Folly	United States	Traditional Animation
The Phantom Moustacher	United States	Traditional Animation
Phantom of the Horse Opera	United States	Traditional Animation
The Pied Piper of Guadalupe	United States	Traditional Animation
The Plot Sickens	United States	Traditional Animation
Poop Deck Pirate	United States	Traditional Animation
Prince Violent	United States	Traditional Animation
The Rebel Without Claws	United States	Traditional Animation
Rendering of a planned highway	Sweden	Computer Animation
The Saga of Windwagon Smith	United States	Traditional Animation
A Scent of the Matterhorn	United States	Traditional Animation
The Shrimp	United States	Traditional Animation
St. Moritz Blitz	United States	Traditional Animation
The Story of a Crime	Soviet Union	Traditional Animation
Strangled Eggs	United States	Traditional Animation
The Substitute	Yugoslavia	Traditional Animation
Sufferin' Cats	United States	Traditional Animation
Switchin' Kitten	United States	Traditional Animation
Trick or Tree	United States	Traditional Animation
Tricky Trout	United States	Traditional Animation
Turtle Scoop	United States	Traditional Animation
What's My Lion?	United States	Traditional Animation
Woody's Kook-Out	United States	Traditional Animation
Zip 'N Snort	United States	Traditional Animation

== 1962 ==
Name	Country	Technique
Adventures of the Road Runner	United States	Traditional Animation
Alpha Omega	Italy	Traditional Animation
Bill of Hare	United States	Traditional Animation
Buddies Thicker Than Water	United States	Traditional Animation
Calypso Cat	United States	Traditional Animation
Careless Caretaker	United States	Traditional Animation
Carmen Get It!	United States	Traditional Animation
Crowin' Pains	United States	Traditional Animation
Crows' Feat	United States	Traditional Animation
Crumley Cogwheel	United States	Traditional Animation
Dicky Moe	United States	Traditional Animation
Fish and Chips	United States	Traditional Animation
Fish and Slips	United States	Traditional Animation
Frog's Legs	United States	Traditional Animation
Funderful Suburbia	United States	Traditional Animation
The Game	Yugoslavia	Live-action/cutout
Giddy Gadgets	United States	Traditional Animation
Good Noose	United States	Traditional Animation
Hi-Fi Jinx	United States	Traditional Animation
High Steaks	United States	Traditional Animation
Hyde and Sneak	United States	Traditional Animation
The Hole	United States	Hand-Painted Animation
Home Sweet Homewrecker	United States	Traditional Animation
Honey's Money	United States	Traditional Animation
Icarus Montgolfier Wright	United States	Traditional Animation
The Jet Cage	United States	Traditional Animation
Landing Stripling	United States	Traditional Animation
Little Woody Riding Hood	United States	Traditional Animation
Louvre Come Back to Me!	United States	Traditional Animation
Love Me, Love Me, Love Me	United Kingdom	Traditional Animation
Mackerel Moocher	United States	Traditional Animation
Male	Japan	Traditional Animation
Martian Through Georgia	United States	Traditional Animation
Mexican Boarders	United States	Traditional Animation
Mother Was a Rooster	United States	Traditional Animation
Mouse into Space	United States	Traditional Animation
My Financial Career	Canada	Traditional Animation
One of the Family	United States	Traditional Animation
The Owl and the Pussycat	United States	Cut-Out Animation
Penny Pals	United States	Traditional Animation
Popcorn and Politics	United States	Traditional Animation
Quackodile Tears	United States	Traditional Animation
The Robot Ringer	United States	Traditional Animation
Rock-a-Bye Gator	United States	Traditional Animation
Rocket Racket	United States	Traditional Animation
Room and Bored	United States	Traditional Animation
Samson Scrap	United States	Traditional Animation
Self Defense... for Cowards	United States	Traditional Animation
A Sheep in the Deep	United States	Traditional Animation
Shishkabugs	United States	Traditional Animation
The Slick Chick	United States	Traditional Animation
Sorry Safari	United States	Traditional Animation
A Symposium on Popular Songs	United States	Traditional Animation
Tall in the Trap	United States	Traditional Animation
The Tom and Jerry Cartoon Kit	United States	Traditional Animation
Tales of a Street Corner	Japan	Traditional Animation
Tragic Magic	United States	Traditional Animation
Voo-Doo Boo-Boo	United States	Traditional Animation
Wet Hare	United States	Traditional Animation
Zoom at the Top	United States	Traditional Animation

== 1963 ==
Name	Country	Technique
The Apple	United Kingdom	Limited animation
Automania 2000	United Kingdom	Cutout animation
Aqua Duck	United States	Traditional animation
Banty Raids	United States	Traditional animation
Boy Pest with Osh	United States	Traditional animation
Calling Dr. Woodpecker	United States	Traditional animation
Chicken Little	United States	Traditional animation
Christmas Cracker	Canada	Cutout animation
Claws in the Lease	United States	Traditional animation
Coy Decoy	United States	Traditional animation
The Cowboy's Flute	China	Traditional animation
The Critic	United States	Hand-painted animation
Devil's Feud Cake	United States	Traditional animation
The Dragon’s Tears	United States	Cutout animation
Drum Up a Tenant	United States	Traditional animation
Fast Buck Duck	United States	Traditional animation
Goodie's Good Deed	United States	Traditional Animation
The Great Rights	United States	Traditional Animation
Greedy Gabby Gator	United States	Traditional Animation
Hare-Breadth Hurry	United States	Traditional Animation
Harry Happy	United States	Traditional Animation
I Was a Teenage Thumb	United States	Traditional Animation
Mad as a Mars Hare	United States	Traditional Animation
Mexican Cat Dance	United States	Traditional Animation
The Million Hare	United States	Traditional Animation
Noddy Goes to Toyland	United Kingdom	Traditional animation
Now Hear This	United States	Traditional Animation
One Weak Vacation	United States	Traditional Animation
Pent-House Mouse	United States	Traditional Animation
Pesky Pelican	United States	Traditional Animation
Pianissimo	United States	Experimental
The Pigs' Feat	United States	Traditional Animation
The Ringading Kid	United States	Traditional Animation
Robin Hoody Woody	United States	Traditional Animation
Salmon Loafer	United States	Traditional Animation
Science Friction	United States	Traditional Animation
Short in the Saddle	United States	Traditional Animation
Shutter Bug	United States	Traditional Animation
Sour Gripes	United States	Traditional Animation
Stowaway Woody	United States	Traditional Animation
Tell Me a Badtime Story	United States	Traditional Animation
The Tenant's Racket	United States	Traditional Animation
Tepee for Two	United States	Traditional Animation
To Beep or Not to Beep	United States	Traditional Animation
Transylvania 6-5000	United States	Traditional Animation
Trash Program	United States	Traditional Animation
The Unmentionables	United States	Traditional Animation
Woolen Under Where	United States	Traditional Animation

== 1964 ==
Name	Country	Technique
Accidents Will Happen	United States	Traditional Animation
Alf, Bill and Fred	United Kingdom	Cutout Animation
And So Tibet	United States	Traditional Animation
Bartholomew Versus the Wheel	United States	Traditional Animation
Breaking the Habit	United States	Cut-Out Animation
The Bus Way to Travel	United States	Traditional Animation
Call Me a Taxi	United States	Traditional Animation
The Cat Above and the Mouse Below	United States	Traditional Animation
Deep Freeze Squeeze	United States	Traditional Animation
Dr. Devil and Mr. Hare	United States	Traditional Animation
Dumb Like a Fox	United States	Traditional Animation
Dumb Patrol	United States	Traditional Animation
False Hare	United States	Traditional Animation
Fix That Clock	United States	Traditional Animation
Fizzicle Fizzle	United States	Traditional Animation
Freeway Fracas	United States	Traditional Animation
A Friend in Tweed	United States	Traditional Animation
Freudy Cat	United States	Traditional Animation
The Games of Angels	France	Abstract Animation
Get Lost! Little Doggy	United States	Traditional Animation
Hawaiian Aye Aye	United States	Traditional Animation
Highway Slobbery	United States	Traditional Animation
Hip Hip Olè	United States	Traditional Animation
Homer on the Range	United States	Traditional Animation
How to Avoid Friendship	United States	Traditional Animation
I Know an Old Lady Who Swallowed a Fly	Canada	Limited
The Iceman Ducketh	United States	Traditional Animation
Is There a Doctor in the Mouse?	United States	Traditional Animation
Laddy and His Lamp	United States	Traditional Animation
The Last Trick	Czechoslovakia	Live-action/stop-motion
Lighthouse Keeping Blues	United States	Traditional Animation
Mermaid	Japan	Traditional Animation
Memory	Japan	Limited
A Message to Gracias	United States	Traditional Animation
Much Ado About Mousing	United States	Traditional Animation
Near Sighted and Far Out	United States	Traditional Animation
Nudnik No. 2	United States	Traditional Animation
Nuts and Volts	United States	Traditional Animation
The Once-Over	United States	Traditional Animation
Pancho's Hideaway	United States	Traditional Animation
Panhandling on MADison Avenue	United States	Traditional Animation
Pink Pajamas	United States	Traditional Animation
The Pink Phink	United States	Traditional Animation
Readin', Writhing and 'Rithmatic	United States	Traditional Animation
Road to Andalay	United States	Traditional Animation
Roamin' Roman	United States	Traditional Animation
Robot Rival	United States	Traditional Animation
Roof Top Razzle-Dazzle	United States	Traditional Animation
Saddle Sore Woody	United States	Traditional Animation
Sailing Zero	United States	Traditional Animation
A Scrap of Paper and a Piece of String	United States	Cut-Out Animation
Señorella and the Glass Huarache	United States	Traditional Animation
Ski-Napper	United States	Traditional Animation
Skinfolks	United States	Traditional Animation
Service with a Smile	United States	Traditional Animation
Snowbody Loves Me	United States	Traditional Animation
Spook-a-Nanny	United States	Traditional Animation
Thumbelina	Soviet Union	Traditional Animation
A Tiger's Tail	United States	Traditional Animation
The Unshrinkable Jerry Mouse	United States	Traditional Animation
War and Pieces	United States	Traditional Animation
Whiz Quiz Kid	United States	Traditional Animation
Woody's Clip Joint	United States	Traditional Animation

== 1965 ==
Name	Country	Technique
A	West Germany	Traditional Animation
Ah, Sweet Mouse-Story of Life	United States	Traditional Animation
Assault and Peppered	United States	Traditional Animation
Bad Day at Cat Rock	United States	Traditional Animation
Birds of a Feather	United States	Traditional Animation
Boniface's Holiday	Soviet Union	Traditional Animation
Boulder Wham!	United States	Traditional Animation
The Brothers Carry-Mouse-Off	United States	Traditional Animation
Bully for Pink	United States	Traditional Animation
Cagey Business	United States	Traditional Animation
Canned Dog Feud	United States	Traditional Animation
Cats and Bruises	United States	Traditional Animation
The Cat's Me-Ouch!	United States	Traditional Animation
A Charlie Brown Christmas	United States	Traditional Animation
Chaser on the Rocks	United States	Traditional Animation
Chili Corn Corny	United States	Traditional Animation
Cigarette and Ashes	Japan	Limited
Citrus World Presents Donald Duck Citrus Products	United States	Traditional Animation
Clay or The Origin of Species	United States	Stop-motion Animation
Corn on the Cop	United States	Traditional Animation
Dial "P" for Pink	United States	Traditional Animation
The Dot and the Line	United States	Traditional Animation
The Drop	Japan	Limited
Fractured Friendship	United States	Traditional Animation
Freewayphobia or The Art of Driving the Super Highway	United States	Traditional Animation
A Game with Stones	Czechoslovakia	Stop-motion Animation
Getting Ahead	United States	Traditional Animation
Go Go Amigo	United States	Traditional Animation
Goofy's Freeway Troubles	United States	Traditional Animation
The Great De Gaulle Stone Operation	United States	Traditional Animation
Half-Baked Alaska	United States	Traditional Animation
Hairied and Hurried	United States	Traditional Animation
The Hand	Czechoslovakia	Puppet/stop-motion
Haunted Mouse	United States	Traditional Animation
Highway Runnery	United States	Traditional Animation
Horning In	United States	Traditional Animation
I'm Just Wild About Jerry	United States	Traditional Animation
Inferior Decorator	United States	Traditional Animation
It's Nice to Have a Mouse Around the House	United States	Traditional Animation
The Itch	United States	Traditional Animation
Janie Get Your Gun	United States	Traditional Animation
Johann Sebastian Bach: Fantasy in G Minor	Czechoslovakia	Live-action/stop-motion
Just Plane Beep	United States	Traditional Animation
A Leak in the Dike	United States	Traditional Animation
Les Boys	United States	Traditional Animation
Moby Duck	United States	Traditional Animation
Ocean Bruise	United States	Traditional Animation
Of Feline Bondage	United States	Traditional Animation
An Ounce of Pink	United States	Traditional Animation
The Outside Dope	United States	Traditional Animation
Pesty Guest	United States	Traditional Animation
Pink Ice	United States	Traditional Animation
Pink Panzer	United States	Traditional Animation
The Pink Tail Fly	United States	Traditional Animation
Pinkfinger	United States	Traditional Animation
Pickled Pink	United States	Traditional Animation
Poor Little Witch Girl	United States	Traditional Animation
Reel Pink	United States	Traditional Animation
Road Runner a Go-Go	United States	Traditional Animation
Run, Run, Sweet Road Runner	United States	Traditional Animation
Rushing Roulette	United States	Traditional Animation
Sailor and the Devil	United Kingdom	Traditional Animation
Shocking Pink	United States	Traditional Animation
Shoeflies	United States	Traditional Animation
The Shooting of Dan McGrew	United States	Traditional Animation
Sink Pink	United States	Traditional Animation
Sioux Me	United States	Traditional Animation
Solitary Refinement	United States	Traditional Animation
Steel and America	United States	Traditional Animation
The Story of George Washington	United States	Traditional Animation
Tally-Hokum	United States	Traditional Animation
Three Little Woodpeckers	United States	Traditional Animation
Tired and Feathered	United States	Traditional Animation
Tom-ic Energy	United States	Traditional Animation
We Give Pink Stamps	United States	Traditional Animation
Well Worn Daffy	United States	Traditional Animation
What's Peckin'	United States	Traditional Animation
The Wild Chase	United States	Traditional Animation
Woodpecker Wanted	United States	Traditional Animation
The Year of the Mouse	United States	Traditional Animation
Zip Zip Hooray!	United States	Traditional Animation

== 1966 ==
Name	Country	Technique
A-Haunting We Will Go	United States	Traditional Animation
Angel	Canada	Experimental
Ape Suzette	United States	Traditional Animation
The Astroduck	United States	Traditional Animation
Astronut Woody	United States	Traditional Animation
The A-Tom-inable Snowman	United States	Traditional Animation
Baggin' the Dragon	United States	Traditional Animation
A Balmy Knight	United States	Traditional Animation
The Big Bite	United States	Traditional Animation
Catty-Cornered	United States	Traditional Animation
Charlie Brown's All Stars!	United States	Traditional Animation
Cirrhosis of the Louvre	United States	Traditional Animation
Clippety Clobbered	United States	Traditional Animation
Cock-A-Doodle Deux Deux	United States	Traditional Animation
Daffy Rents	United States	Traditional Animation
The Defiant Giant	United States	Traditional Animation
Donald's Fire Survival Plan	United States	Traditional Animation
The Drag	Canada	Cutout Animation
Duel Personality	United States	Traditional Animation
Et Cetera	Czechoslovakia	Stop-motion Animation
Feather Finger	United States	Traditional Animation
Filet Meow	United States	Traditional Animation
From Nags to Witches	United States	Traditional Animation
Funny is Funny	United States	Traditional Animation
Genie with the Light Pink Fur	United States	Traditional Animation
Hassle in a Castle	United States	Traditional Animation
A Herb Alpert and the Tijuana Brass Double Feature	United States	Cutout Animation
How the Grinch Stole Christmas!	United States	Traditional Animation
I Want My Mummy	United States	Traditional Animation
It's the Great Pumpkin, Charlie Brown	United States	Traditional Animation
Jerry-Go-Round	United States	Traditional Animation
Jerry, Jerry, Quite Contrary	United States	Traditional Animation
Lonesome Ranger	United States	Traditional Animation
Love Me, Love My Mouse	United States	Traditional Animation
Matinee Mouse	United States	Traditional Animation
Mexican Mousepiece	United States	Traditional Animation
Monster of Ceremonies	United States	Traditional Animation
Mucho Locos	United States	Traditional Animation
Napoleon Blown-Aparte	United States	Traditional Animation
Op, Pop, Wham and Bop	United States	Traditional Animation
Out and Out Rout	United States	Traditional Animation
Pictures at a Exhibition	Japan	Traditional Animation
Pink-A-Boo	United States	Traditional Animation
The Pink Blueprint	United States	Traditional Animation
Pink Pistons	United States	Traditional Animation
Pink, Plunk, Plink	United States	Traditional Animation
Pink Punch	United States	Traditional Animation
The Pique Poquette of Paris	United States	Traditional Animation
Plastered in Paris	United States	Traditional Animation
Polar Fright	United States	Traditional Animation
Potions and Notions	United States	Traditional Animation
Practical Yolk	United States	Traditional Animation
Punch and Judy	Czechoslovakia	Live-action/puppet/stop-motion
Puss 'n' Boats	United States	Traditional Animation
Reaux, Reaux, Reaux Your Boat	United States	Traditional Animation
Rock-A-Bye Pinky	United States	Traditional Animation
Rough Riding Hood	United States	Traditional Animation
Shot and Bothered	United States	Traditional Animation
Sick Transit	United States	Traditional Animation
Sicque! Sicque! Sicque!	United States	Traditional Animation
Smile Pretty, Say Pink	United States	Traditional Animation
The Snails	France	Stop-motion/traditional
Snow Excuse	United States	Traditional Animation
Snow Place Like Home	United States	Traditional Animation
The Solid Tin Coyote	United States	Traditional Animation
South Pole Pals	United States	Traditional Animation
Space Kid	United States	Traditional Animation
A Squeak in the Deep	United States	Traditional Animation
Sugar and Spies	United States	Traditional Animation
Super Pink	United States	Traditional Animation
Swing Ding Amigo	United States	Traditional Animation
Teeny Weeny Meany	United States	Traditional Animation
That's No Lady — That's Notre Dame!	United States	Traditional Animation
There Lived Kozyavin	Soviet Union	Traditional Animation
Throne for a Loss	United States	Traditional Animation
Toulouse La Trick	United States	Traditional Animation
Trick or Cheat	United States	Traditional Animation
Two by Two	United States	Traditional Animation
Unsafe and Seine	United States	Traditional Animation
Vitamin Pink	United States	Traditional Animation
A Wedding Knight	United States	Traditional Animation
What on Earth!	Canada	Traditional Animation
Winnie the Pooh and the Honey Tree	United States	Traditional Animation
Woody and the Beanstalk	United States	Traditional Animation

== 1967 ==
Name	Country	Technique
1967 Busch Advertisement	United States	Traditional Animation
Advance and Be Mechanized	United States	Traditional Animation
Alter Egotist	United States	Traditional Animation
The Bear That Wasn't	United States	Traditional Animation
Black, Kloke & Dagga	United States	Traditional animation
The Blacksheep Blacksmith	United States	Traditional Animation
Bomb Voyage	United States	Traditional Animation
The Box	United States	Traditional Animation
A Bridges Grows in Brooklyn	United States	Traditional Animation
Brother Bat	United States	Traditional Animation
Canadian Can-Can	United States	Traditional Animation
Cannery Rodent	United States	Traditional Animation
Cat and Dupli-cat	United States	Traditional Animation
Chilly and the Woodchopper	United States	Traditional Animation
Chilly Chums	United States	Traditional Animation
Congratulations It's Pink	United States	Traditional Animation
Clean Sweep	United States	Traditional Animation
Cool Cat	United States	Traditional Animation
Crow De Guerre	United States	Traditional Animation
Daffy's Diner	United States	Traditional Animation
Eye Myth	United States	Experimental
Family Planning	United States	Traditional Animation
Fiesta Fiasco	United States	Traditional Animation
Flexipede	United States	Computer Animation
Forget Ne Nuts	United States	Traditional Animation
From Orbit to Obit	United States	Traditional Animation
The Fuz	United States	Traditional Animation
Geronimo & Son	United States	Traditional Animation
Go Away Stowaway	United States	Traditional Animation
Guided Mouse-ille	United States	Traditional Animation
Halt, Who Grows There?	United States	Traditional Animation
The Hand is Pinker than the Eye	United States	Traditional Animation
Have Gun, Can't Travel	United States	Traditional Animation
High But Not Dry	United States	Traditional Animation
Historia Naturae, Suita	Czechoslovakia	Live-action/stop-motion
The Hobbit	United States	Limited
Horse Play	United States	Traditional Animation
Hot Diggity Dog	United States	Traditional Animation
Hot Time on Ice	United States	Traditional Animation
The House That Jack Built	Canada	Traditional Animation
Hummingbird	United States	Computer Animation
In the Pink	United States	Traditional Animation
Jet Pink	United States	Traditional Animation
Keep the Cool, Baby	United States	Traditional Animation
Le Bowser Bagger	United States	Traditional Animation
Le Cop on Le Rocks	United States	Traditional Animation
Le Escape Goat	United States	Traditional Animation
Le Pig-Al Patrol	United States	Traditional Animation
Le Quiet Squad	United States	Traditional Animation
Life in a Tin	Italy	Traditional Animation
Marvin Digs	United States	Traditional Animation
Merlin the Magic Mouse	United States	Traditional Animation
Mini-Squirts	United States	Traditional Animation
Mouse Trek	United States	Traditional Animation
The Music Mice-Tro	United States	Traditional Animation
My Daddy the Astronaut	United States	Traditional Animation
The Nautical Nut	United States	Traditional Animation
O-Solar-Meow	United States	Traditional Animation
The Opera Caper	United States	Traditional Animation
Operation Shanghai	United States	Traditional Animation
Pink of the Litter	United States	Traditional Animation
Pink Outs	United States	Traditional Animation
Pink Panic	United States	Traditional Animation
Pink Paradise	United States	Traditional Animation
Pink Posies	United States	Traditional Animation
Pinknic	United States	Traditional Animation
Pinto Pink	United States	Traditional Animation
The Plumber	United States	Traditional Animation
Prefabricated Pink	United States	Traditional Animation
Purr-Chance to Dream	United States	Traditional Animation
Quacker Tracker	United States	Traditional Animation
Robin Hood-winked	United States	Traditional Animation
Rock 'n' Rodent	United States	Traditional Animation
Rodent to Stardom	United States	Traditional Animation
Sacré Bleu Cross	United States	Traditional Animation
Scrooge McDuck and Money	United States	Traditional Animation
Secret Agent Woody Woodpecker	United States	Traditional Animation
The Shooting of Caribou Lou	United States	Traditional Animation
Shutter Bugged Cat	United States	Traditional Animation
Sissy Sheriff	United States	Traditional Animation
Speedy Ghost to Town	United States	Traditional Animation
The Spy Swatter	United States	Traditional Animation
The Squaw-Path	United States	Traditional Animation
The Stubborn Cowboy	United States	Traditional Animation
The Stuck-Up Wolf	United States	Traditional Animation
Surf-Bored Cat	United States	Traditional Animation
Think or Sink	United States	Traditional Animation
Tour de Farce	United States	Traditional Animation
The Trip	United States	Traditional Animation
Vicious Viking	United States	Traditional Animation
You're in Love, Charlie Brown	United States	Traditional Animation

== 1968 ==
Name	Country	Technique
3 Ring Wing-Ding	United States	Traditional Animation
The Alphabet	United States	Live-action/traditional
Bear De Guerre	United States	Traditional Animation
Big Game Haunt	United States	Traditional Animation
Bunny and Claude (We Rob Carrot Patches)	United States	Traditional Animation
Cherche Le Phantom	United States	Traditional Animation
Chiller Dillers	United States	Traditional Animation
Chimp and Zee	United States	Traditional Animation
Come On In! The Water's Pink	United States	Traditional Animation
Cosmic Zoom	Canada	Experimental
The Door	United States	Traditional Animation
A Drop of Honey	Soviet Union	Cutout Animation
The Early Birds	United States	Traditional Animation
Fat in the Saddle	United States	Traditional Animation
Feud with a Dude	United States	Traditional Animation
Feudin Fightin-N-Fussin'	United States	Traditional Animation
The Flat	Czechoslovakia	Live-action/stop-motion
Flying Circus	United States	Traditional Animation
The Garden	Czechoslovakia	Live-action/stop-motion
Genesis	Japan	Limited
G.I. Pink	United States	Traditional Animation
Hawks and Doves	United States	Traditional Animation
He's Your Dog, Charlie Brown	United States	Traditional Animation
Highway Hecklers	United States	Traditional Animation
Hippydrome Tiger	United States	Traditional Animation
Hocus Pocus Pow Wow	United States	Traditional Animation
Junior and Karlson	Soviet Union	Traditional Animation
Kitty	Soviet Union	Computer Animation
La Feet's Defeat	United States	Traditional Animation
A Lad in Bagdad	United States	Traditional Animation
Le Ball and Chain Gang	United States	Traditional Animation
Le Great Dane Robbery	United States	Traditional Animation
Les Miserobots	United States	Traditional Animation
Little Beaux Pink	United States	Traditional Animation
The Little Drummer Boy	United States, Japan	Stop-motion Animation
The Little Mermaid	Soviet Union	Traditional Animation
London Derriere	United States	Traditional Animation
Lotsa Luck	United States	Traditional Animation
Lucky Pink	United States	Traditional Animation
The Magic Pear Tree	United States	Traditional Animation
The Night Before Christmas	United States	Traditional Animation
Norman Normal	United States	Traditional Animation
Of Horses and Men	United States	Traditional Animation
One Horse Town	United States	Traditional Animation
Pas de deux	Canada	Experimental
Peck of Trouble	United States	Traditional Animation
Picnic with Weissmann	Czechoslovakia, United Kingdom	Live-action/stop-motion
Pink in the Clink	United States	Traditional Animation
Pink Is a Many Splintered Thing	United States	Traditional Animation
The Pink Package Plot	United States	Traditional Animation
The Pink Pill	United States	Traditional Animation
The Pink Quarterback	United States	Traditional Animation
Pink Sphinx	United States	Traditional Animation
Pink Valiant	United States	Traditional Animation
Pinkadilly Circus	United States	Traditional Animation
Pinkcome Tax	United States	Traditional Animation
Prehistoric Pink	United States	Traditional Animation
Psychedelic Pink	United States	Traditional Animation
Put-Put, Pink	United States	Traditional Animation
Sally Sargent	United States	Traditional Animation
See Ya Later Gladiator	United States	Traditional Animation
Sky Blue Pink	United States	Traditional Animation
Skyscraper Caper	United States	Traditional Animation
Steps Toward Maturity and Health	United States	Traditional Animation
Tickled Pink	United States	Traditional Animation
Transylvania Mania	United States	Traditional Animation
Twinkle, Twinkle, Little Pink	United States	Traditional Animation
The Turn On	United States	Traditional Animation
Under Sea Dogs	United States	Traditional Animation
Understanding Stresses and Strains	United States	Traditional Animation
Walking	Canada	Traditional Animation
Why Man Creates	United States	Live-action/various
Windy Day	United States	Hand-painted/traditional
Winnie the Pooh and the Blustery Day	United States	Traditional Animation
Woody the Freeloader	United States	Traditional Animation

== 1969 ==
Name	Country	Technique
Absent-minded Giovanny	Soviet Union	Traditional Animation
Amentü Gemisi Nasıl Yürüdü	Turkey	Hand-Painted Animation
The Ant and the Aardvark	United States	Traditional Animation
The Ant from Uncle	United States	Traditional Animation
Antoshka	Soviet Union	Traditional Animation
Ballerina on the Boat	Soviet Union	Traditional Animation
Bambi Meets Godzilla	Canada	Traditional Animation
The Bremen Town Musicians	Soviet Union	Traditional Animation
Bugged by a Bee	United States	Traditional Animation
Carte Blanched	United States	Traditional Animation
Chilly and the Looney Gooney	United States	Traditional Animation
The Deadwood Thunderball	United States	Traditional Animation
Don Juan	Czechoslovakia	Puppet
Dune Bug	United States	Traditional Animation
Extinct Pink	United States	Traditional Animation
Father Frost and Summer	Soviet Union	Traditional Animation
The Fight	United States	Traditional Animation
Fistic Mystic	United States	Traditional Animation
Flying Feet	United States	Traditional Animation
The Fox, the Bear and the Motorcycle	Soviet Union	Traditional Animation
French Freud	United States	Traditional Animation
Frosty the Snowman	United States	Traditional Animation
The Game	United States	Traditional Animation
Gena the Crocodile	Soviet Union	Stop-motion Animation
A Girl and an Elephant	Soviet Union	Traditional Animation
Go for Croak	United States	Traditional Animation
Golden Boy	Soviet Union	Stop-motion Animation
Grandma's Umbrella	Soviet Union	Stop-motion Animation
The Great Carrot Train Robbery	United States	Traditional Animation
Great Cold	Soviet Union	Stop-motion Animation
Hasty But Tasty	United States	Traditional Animation
Hook, Line and Stinker	United States	Traditional Animation
Hurts and Flowers	United States	Traditional Animation
In the Country of Unlearned Lessons	Soviet Union	Traditional Animation
In the Pink of the Night	United States	Traditional Animation
Injun Trouble	United States	Traditional Animation
Isle of Caprice	United States	Traditional Animation
It Was a Short Summer, Charlie Brown	United States	Traditional Animation
It's Tough to Be a Bird	United States	Traditional Animation
I've Got Ants in My Plans	United States	Traditional Animation
Little Skeeter	United States	Traditional Animation
Lupin III: Pilot Film	Japan	Traditional Animation
Mickey Mouse in Vietnam	United States	Traditional Animation
Mosaic	Soviet Union	Traditional Animation
Never Bug an Ant	United States	Traditional Animation
Of Men and Demons	United States	Traditional Animation
A Pair of Greenbacks	United States	Traditional Animation
A Pair of Sneakers	United States	Traditional Animation
Phoney Pony	United States	Traditional Animation
Pierre and Cottage Cheese	United States	Traditional Animation
Pink-A-Rella	United States	Traditional Animation
Pink on the Cob	United States	Traditional Animation
Pink Pest Control	United States	Traditional Animation
Physical Fitness and Good Health	United States	Traditional Animation
A Plastic Hedgehog	Soviet Union	Stop-motion Animation
Prehistoric Super Salesman	United States	Traditional Animation
Project Reject	United States	Traditional Animation
A Quiet Week in the House	Czechoslovakia	Live-action/stop-motion
Rabbit Stew and Rabbits Too!	United States	Traditional Animation
Return from Olympus	Soviet Union	Traditional Animation
Seasons	Soviet Union	Stop-motion Animation
Shamrock and Roll	United States	Traditional Animation
Sleepy Time Bear	United States	Traditional Animation
Slink Pink	United States	Traditional Animation
The Social Side of Health	United States	Traditional Animation
Tijuana Toads	United States	Traditional Animation
Technology, Phooey	United States	Traditional Animation
Think Before You Pink	United States	Traditional Animation
A Pair of Sneakers	United States	Traditional Animation
The Ruby Eye of the Monkey God	United States	Traditional Animation
Ship A'hoy Woody	United States	Traditional Animation
The Snow Girl	Soviet Union	Traditional Animation
The Stolen New Moon	Soviet Union	Traditional Animation
A Sunny Kernel	Soviet Union	Stop-motion Animation
The Tale About Kolobok - The Small Round Loaf	Soviet Union	Stop-motion Animation
To See or Not to See	Canada	Stop-motion Animation
Tumble Weed Greed	United States	Traditional Animation
Umka	Soviet Union	Traditional Animation
We Are Looking for a Pram	Soviet Union	Traditional Animation
Well, Just You Wait!	Soviet Union	Traditional Animation
Well, Just You Wait! (Issue 1)	Soviet Union	Traditional Animation
Winnie-the-Pooh	Soviet Union	Traditional Animation
A Witful Princess	Soviet Union	Traditional Animation
Woody's Knight Mare	United States	Traditional Animation
