= Jan Švankmajer filmography =

Jan Švankmajer is a Czech film director, animator, writer, playwright and artist.

== Feature-length films ==
Year	English title	Original title	Notes
1988	Alice	Něco z Alenky	Based on Alice's Adventures in Wonderland by Lewis Carroll
1994	Faust	Lekce Faust	Based on the Faust legend (including traditional Czech puppet show versions), Marlowe's Doctor Faustus, and Goethe's Faust.
1996	Conspirators of Pleasure	Spiklenci slasti	
2000	Little Otik	Otesánek	Based on Otesánek by Karel Jaromír Erben
2005	Lunacy	Šílení	Based on The System of Doctor Tarr and Professor Fether and The Premature Burial by Edgar Allan Poe
2010	Surviving Life	Přežít svůj život	
2018	Insects	Hmyz	Based on Pictures from the Insects' Life by Karel Čapek and Josef Čapek
2022	The Kunstcamera	Kunstkamera	Documentary about the art and artifacts Svanmajer and his late wife have gathered over the years.

== Short films ==
Year	English title	Original title	Notes
1964	The Last Trick	Poslední trik pana Schwarcewalldea a pana Edgara	
1965	Johann Sebastian Bach: Fantasy in G minor	Johann Sebastian Bach: Fantasia G-moll	
1965	A Game with Stones	Spiel mit Steinen	
1966	Punch and Judy	Rakvičkárna	Also known as The Coffin Factory and The Lych House
1966	Et Cetera		
1967	Historia Naturae (Suita)		
1968	The Garden	Zahrada	
1968	The Flat	Byt	Available on the Little Otik DVD. Included in the Metropolitan Museum's "Surrealism Beyond Borders" exhibit (2021–22)
1968	Picnic with Weissmann	Picknick mit Weismann	
1969	A Quiet Week in the House	Tichý týden v domě	
1970	Don Juan	Don Šajn	
1970	The Ossuary	Kostnice	A documentary about the Sedlec Ossuary
1971	Jabberwocky	Žvahlav aneb šatičky slaměného Huberta	Based on Jabberwocky by Lewis Carroll
1972	Leonardo's Diary	Leonardův deník	
1979	Castle of Otranto	Otrantský zámek	Based on The Castle of Otranto by Horace Walpole
1980	The Fall of the House of Usher	Zánik domu Usherů	Based on The Fall of the House of Usher by Edgar Allan Poe
1982	Dimensions of Dialogue	Možnosti dialogu	
1983	Down to the Cellar	Do pivnice	
1983	The Pendulum, the Pit and Hope	Kyvadlo, jáma a naděje	Based on The Pit and the Pendulum by Edgar Allan Poe and A Torture by Hope by Auguste Villiers de L'Isle-Adam
1988	Virile Games	Mužné hry	Also known as The Male Game
1988	Another Kind of Love		Music video for Hugh Cornwell
1988	Meat Love	Zamilované maso	
1989	Darkness/Light/Darkness	Tma, světlo, tma	
1989	Flora		
1989	Animated Self-Portraits		Anthology film by 27 animators
1990	The Death of Stalinism in Bohemia	Konec stalinismu v Čechách	
1992	Food	Jídlo	

== Animation and art direction ==
Year	English title	Original title	Director
1978	Dinner for Adele	Adéla ještě nevečeřela	Oldřich Lipský
1981	The Mysterious Castle in the Carpathians	Tajemství hradu v Karpatech	Oldřich Lipský
1982	Ferat Vampire	Upír z Feratu	Juraj Herz
1983	Visitors	Návštěvníci	Jindřich Polák
1984	Three Veterans	Tři veteráni	Oldřich Lipský
