= Otranto (disambiguation) =

Otranto is a city in Italy.

Otranto may also refer to:

- HMS Otranto
- Otranto Township, Mitchell County, Iowa, USA
- The Castle of Otranto by Horace Walpole
- Castle of Otranto (film)
- Strait of Otranto, Passage between Adriatic and Ionian seas
