= Walt Disney Productions short films (1960–1985) =

This is a list of short films created by Walt Disney Animation Studios between the years 1960 and 1985.

== 1960s-1980s ==
=== Theatrical shorts ===
==== 1960s ====
Series	Title	Director	Release Date	DVD Release	Notes
—N/a	Goliath II	Wolfgang Reitherman	January 21, 1960	"Disney Rarities: Celebrated Shorts: 1920s–1960s" "It's a Small World of Fun, Volume 1"	In theaters with Toby Tyler
—N/a	The Saga of Windwagon Smith	Charles Nichols	March 16, 1961	"Disney Rarities: Celebrated Shorts: 1920s–1960s" "Walt Disney Animation Collection, Volume 4: Animated Short Films - The Tortoise and the Hare"	Based on the story of Windwagon Smith. In theaters with The Absent-Minded Professor. Last short directed by Charles Nichols.
Educational	Donald and the Wheel	Hamilton Luske	June 21, 1961	"The Chronological Donald, Volume Four"	Starring Donald Duck. In theaters with The Parent Trap.
Donald Duck	The Litterbug	Hamilton Luske	June 21, 1961	"The Chronological Donald, Volume Four"	In theaters with The Parent Trap. Final cartoon produced in the Donald Duck series.
One-Shot	Aquamania	Wolfgang Reitherman	December 20, 1961	"The Complete Goofy" "Funny Factory with Goofy"	Starring Goofy; Goofy is not mentioned in any of the title cards.
One-Shot	A Symposium on Popular Songs	Bill Justice	December 19, 1962	"Disney Rarities: Celebrated Shorts: 1920s–1960s"	Starring Ludwig Von Drake; Only appearance of the character in theatrical release. In theaters with In Search of the Castaways. Film combines traditional animation with stop-motion.
Educational	Freewayphobia or The Art of Driving the Super Highway	Les Clark	February 13, 1965	—N/a	Starring Goofy.
Educational	Goofy's Freeway Troubles	Les Clark	September 22, 1965	—N/a	Starring Goofy.
Winnie the Pooh	Winnie the Pooh and the Honey Tree*	Wolfgang Reitherman	February 4, 1966	The Many Adventures of Winnie the Pooh Blu-ray and DVD	In theaters with The Ugly Dachshund. Edited into The Many Adventures of Winnie the Pooh.
Educational	Scrooge McDuck and Money	Hamilton Luske	March 23, 1967	—N/a	Starring Scrooge McDuck; First theatrical appearance of the character. Last theatrical short supervised by Walt Disney
Winnie the Pooh	Winnie the Pooh and the Blustery Day	Wolfgang Reitherman	December 20, 1968	Pooh's Grand Adventure: The Search for Christopher Robin	In theaters with The Horse in the Gray Flannel Suit. Last short produced by Walt Disney. Edited into The Many Adventures of Winnie the Pooh.
Educational	It's Tough to Be a Bird	Ward Kimball	December 10, 1969	—N/a	

==== 1970s ====
Series	Title	Director	Release Date	DVD Release	Notes
Winnie the Pooh	Winnie the Pooh and Tigger Too	John Lounsbery	December 20, 1974	The Many Adventures of Winnie the Pooh	In theaters with The Island at the Top of the World. Edited into The Many Adventures of Winnie the Pooh.
—N/a	The Small One	Don Bluth	December 16, 1978	"Classic Holiday Stories"	In theaters with a reissue of Pinocchio

==== 1980s ====
Series	Title	Director	Release Date	DVD Release	Notes
—N/a	Vincent	Tim Burton	October 1, 1982	The Nightmare Before Christmas	Stop-motion
Educational	Fun with Mr. Future	Darrell Van Citters	October 27, 1982	—N/a	Limited release in Los Angeles only, Combines animatronics, animation and live-action. Short originally started out as EPOCT TV Special
Winnie the Pooh	Winnie the Pooh and a Day for Eeyore	Rick Reinert	March 11, 1983	The Many Adventures of Winnie the Pooh	In theaters with a reissue of The Sword in the Stone. Produced by Rick Reinert Productions.
Mickey Mouse	Mickey's Christmas Carol	Burny Mattinson	December 16, 1983	"Mickey Mouse in Living Color, Volume Two" "Classic Holiday Stories"	In theaters with a reissue of The Rescuers. Mickey, Minnie, Donald, Daisy, Goofy, Horace, Clarabelle, Pete, Chip, and Dale, Huey, Duey and Louie, Scrooge, Willie, Clara, The Three Little Pigs and many more all return in this cartoon. This was also the first Mickey Mouse cartoon produced without Walt Disney. All films from now on produced in modern widescreen aspect ratio. Last short with Buena Vista distribution titles at the front and the last short with Walt Disney Production copyright notice.

=== Non-theatrical shorts ===
Note: All of the following non-theatrical shorts are educational shorts unless otherwise noted and they were generally distributed to schools unless otherwise is noted.

==== 1960s ====
Series	Title	Director	Release Date	DVD Release	Notes
Educational	Steel & America	Les Clark	May 5, 1965	—N/a	Starring Donald Duck. Produced for the American Iron and Steel Institute.
Educational	Donald's Fire Survival Plan	Les Clark	May 5, 1966	—N/a	Starring Donald Duck.
Educational	Family Planning	Les Clark	December 1, 1967	—N/a	Starring Donald Duck. Mostly shown in Latin America
Educational	Of Horses and Men	Les Clark	?.?.1968	—N/a	
Upjohn's Triangle of Health	Steps Toward Maturity and Health	Les Clark	June 1968	—N/a	
Upjohn's Triangle of Health	Understanding Stresses and Strains	Les Clark	June 1968	—N/a	
Upjohn's Triangle of Health	Physical Fitness and Good Health†	Les Clark	August 1969	—N/a	
Upjohn's Triangle of Health	The Social Side of Health	Les Clark	August 1969	—N/a	
What Should I Do?	The Fight	Les Clark	August 1969	—N/a	
What Should I Do?	The Game	Les Clark	December 1969	—N/a	

==== 1970s ====
Series	Title	Director	Release Date	DVD Release	Notes
What Should I Do?	New Girl	Les Clark	March 1970	—N/a	
What Should I Do?	The Lunch Money	Les Clark	July 1970	—N/a	
What Should I Do?	The Project	Les Clark	December 1970	—N/a	
Educational	Teeth are for Chewing	Les Clark	September 1971	—N/a	
Educational	The Great Search: Man's Need for Power and Energy	Les Clark	December 1971	—N/a	Last short released during Roy Disney's lifetime
Educational	Get the Message	Les Clark	July 1972	—N/a	
Educational	VD Attack Plan	Les Clark	January 1973	—N/a	
Educational	Man, Monsters and Mysteries	Les Clark	December 6, 1974	Pete's Dragon	Released theatrically in South Africa
Educational	Understanding Alcohol Use and Abuse	John Ewing	September 1979	—N/a	Co-produced with Reynolds Film Export

==== 1980s ====
Note: All Educational shorts were mostly produced by Walt Disney Educational productions and were distributed to schools unless otherwise is noted.

Series	Title	Director	Release Date	DVD Release	Notes
Educational	Foods and Fun: A Nutrition Adventure	Rick Reinert	September 1980	—N/a	Co-produced with Rick Reinert Productions; Featuring the Orange Bird.
Winnie the Pooh	Winnie the Pooh Discovers the Seasons	Rick Reinert	September 6, 1981	—N/a	Co-produced with Rick Reinert Productions
Educational	Smoking: The Choice Is Yours	John Ewing	September 1981	—N/a	Co-produced with Reynolds Film Export
Donald Duck	Destination: Careers	Rick Reinert	September 1983	—N/a	Co-produced with Rick Reinert Productions
Donald Duck	Destination: Communications	Rick Reinert	September 1983	—N/a	Co-produced with Rick Reinert Productions
Donald Duck	Destination: Excellence	Rick Reinert	September 1983	—N/a	Co-produced with Rick Reinert Productions
Donald Duck	Destination: Science	Rick Reinert	September 1983	—N/a	Co-produced with Rick Reinert Productions
Educational	How to Exercise?		March 1984	—N/a	Co-produced with Sunwest Production
Educational	What Is Fitness Exercise?		March 1984	—N/a	Co-produced with Sunwest Production
Educational	Why Exercise?		March 1984	—N/a	Co-produced with Sunwest Production
Educational	Harold And His Amazing Green Plants	Bob Kurtz	August 1984	—N/a	Co-produced with Kurtz & Friends
Educational	Advice on Lice		September 1985	—N/a	

=== Theme Park shorts ===
Series	Title	Director	Release Date	DVD Release	Notes
Theme Parks	All Because Man Wanted to Fly	July 4, 1984			Features the Orville the Albatross from The Rescuers in a film that combines live action and animation.
