= The Super 6 =

American animated television series

The Super 6 is an animated cartoon series which was produced by DePatie–Freleng Enterprises and Mirisch-Rich Television Productions in 1966, and shown on NBC from 1966 to 1969. This was DePatie–Freleng's first vehicle for Saturday morning. Only one season of the show was produced, but NBC ran the series for three years in the same timeslot.

The show was a superhero spoof which featured six diverse characters working for Super Services Inc., offering "heroes for hire" under the supervision of the cranky Super Chief. Each episode consisted of three five- to six-minute segments, with the introductory segment featuring Super Bwoing and the last featuring one of the other five heroes. The middle segment featured the unrelated The Brothers Matzoriley.

The Super 6 theme song was performed by Gary Lewis & the Playboys.

== Plot ==
The show was broken up into three segments, with the first and the third segment centered around a superhero agency called the Super Service, where superheroes would be given assignments by the Dispatcher.

The first segment featured Super Bwoing, an apprentice hero who almost never got good assignments. Most of his adventures involved low-threat situations, desperation situations where nobody else was available, and the assignments he gave to himself (usually by overhearing half a conversation and completely misunderstanding it). His competence varied from episode to episode.

The middle segment was always The Brothers Matzoriley, a three-headed man who got into misadventures completely unrelated to the Super Service agency.

The third segment featured another member of the Super Six in a solo adventure, a different hero in each episode. The tone of these adventures varied depending on the character, from the narcissistic and ineffective Captain Whammo (aka Captain Zammo) to the tough-talking noir hero Elevator Man.

== The Super 6 membership ==
The Super 6 consisted of the following:

- Super Bwoing: Noted for his rather unremarkable physique, extreme clumsiness, and his winged red helmet, echoing the helmet worn by the Greco-Roman deity Mercury. His preferred mode of transportation is to fly through the air on his guitar (the "Super Bwoinger"), using the strings like reins on a horse. His primary superpower is the ability to emit a super "laser beam" from his eyes, although he has superhuman strength as well. Due to his being an apprentice hero, in addition to being the clumsiest of the Super Service heroes, he seems to only get jobs if the others were busy or on holidays; in essence, he is the last choice and, in any case, better than nothing. Despite his bumbling, however, he almost always manages to catch his villains. He also appears in short cartoons that show him interacting with the other superheroes,the Chief, and occasionally, the Brothers Matzoriley. His voice is a caricature of Jimmy Stewart's.
- Granite Man: Composed entirely of gray rock, and possessing the expected powers of near-invulnerability, incredible strength and a powerful uppercut. When not working for the Super Service, Granite Man is a statue in a local park. His assistant is Percival, a messenger pigeon who wakes him from his statue mode with the words "Granite Man, oh rock of power, awake and face this dangerous hour!".
- Magneto Man: As the name implies, his powers are based on magnetism. His assistant is a young sidekick named "Cal", the brains of the pair. Both heroes are from London, and have exaggerated English accents; Magneto Man sounds like actor Cary Grant.
- Elevator Man: Ironically the shortest of the Six, he wears a pale gray safari suit. By pressing one of two elevator buttons on his belt buckle, he can shrink to the size of an ant or grow into a giant.
- Super Scuba: An ocean-based hero who speaks like Dean Martin, Super Scuba wears green scuba gear and lives in an underwater cave with his secretary Bubbles, a mermaid.
- Captain Whammo/Zammo: This muscular, long-haired blond hero is usually dispatched to fight villains of a more military nature. His powers include flight and incredible strength, and he uses the catchphrase of "Thither, Yonder and Away!" as he leaps to the skies. The Captain and his partner Private Hammo also have the power to travel back in time to various historical events as part of their assignments.

== Captain Whammo vs. Captain Zammo ==
This character appeared in the smallest number of segments of any of the other members of the Super 6. After his first appearance, however, his name was changed from "Whammo" to "Zammo". According to Friz Freleng in a [1982] interview, the name change occurred when Wham-O, creators of such toys as the Super Ball, filed a legal grievance against DePatie-Freleng over trademark infringement. Reportedly, the first commercial to air after the first televised "Captain Whammo" segment was, ironically, for the Super Ball.

== The Brothers Matzoriley ==
This third segment was unrelated to the Super 6, and starred a bizarre, three-headed character known collectively as "The Brothers Matzoriley" - a parody in name, of The Brothers Karamazov. They were "Siamese triplets" who were Three Stooges-style bumblers, always looking for a new job. Their names, Weft, Wight and Wong, were a play on "left", "right" and "wrong", respectively. Although occupying one body, each head had its own distinct personality; the left head, Weft, being that of a tough guy with a Brooklyn accent, the right head, Wight, being a wimpy coward with a very nervous delivery, and the middle head, Wong, being a smart-aleck Chinese, who dispensed absurd parodies of Confucius proverbs beginning with "Confusion say...". All three personalities were of a broad, stereotypical nature.

A prototype version of the Brothers Matzoriley first appeared in the credits of A Shot in the Dark. Another version appeared in The Great De Gaulle Stone Operation (the first short in The Inspector series). In the cartoon, the brothers steal a precious diamond in the oddest ways from the Inspector. In a comic plot twist ending, they wind up winning the day after the Inspector accidentally drinks a glass of water with the diamond in it. The brothers (disguised as a nurse) steal it after a surgeon removes it during an emergency operation. In The Great De Gaulle Stone Operation, Weft (voiced by Paul Frees, who also voiced Wong) spoke with a Soviet-Russian accent, while Wight (voiced by Pat Harrington Jr.) had a suave British-type voice. In contrast to their depiction in The Super Six, they had different voices, but similar personalities - although the middle Chinese head bore some resemblance to the version that would later appear in The Super 6.

== Data ==
The series was broadcast by NBC from September 10, 1966 to January 21, 1967. NBC continued to air reruns until August 31, 1969.

20 episodes (each containing three cartoons) were made.

TGG Direct (under license from MGM Home Entertainment) has released the entire series on DVD.

== Voices ==
- Daws Butler - Brother Matzoriley #2, Magneto Man
- Pat Carroll - Additional Voices
- Paul Frees - Dispatcher "Super Chief", Brother Matzoriley #1 and #3, Captain Whammo/Zammo
- June Foray - Bubbles
- Joan Gerber - Additional Voices
- Arte Johnson - Super Scuba
- Lyn Johnson - Granite Man, Percival
- Diana Maddox - Cal
- Charles Smith - Super Bwoing
- Paul Stewart - Elevator Man

== Staff ==
- Supervising Director: Gerry Chiniquy
- Directors: Steven Clark, Hawley Pratt, Norm McCabe, George Singer, Robert McKimson, John Walker
- Story Supervision: John Dunn
- Writers: Tony Benedict, Alan Dinehart, Don Jurwich, Walter Black, John Freeman, Lee Mishkin, Homer Brightman, Dale Hale, Jack Miller, Bill Danch, Bill Hamilton, Michael O'Conner, Art Diamond, Cal Howard, Jim Ryan
- Storyboard & Layout: Corny Cole, Burt Freund, Bob Givens, Norm Gottfredson, Jan Green, Dave Hanan, Lin Larsen, Marty Murphy, Tony Rivera, Jacques Rupp, Al Wilson
- Animation: Frank Andrina, Bob Goe, Bob Matz, Dale Case, Manny Gould, Murray McClellan, Herman Cohen, Lee Halpern, Morey Redan, Jim Davis, Bill Hutten, Ed Soloman, Xenia Demattia, Art Leonardi, Ken Southworth, John Garling, Ed Love, Don Williams
- Backgrounds: Shelia Brown, Gloria Wood, Roger Collins, Tom Yakutis
- Supervising Film Editor: Lee Gunther
- Film Editors: Lou Gordon, Chuck McCann, Joseph J. Reitano
- Voices: Daws Butler, Pat Carroll, Paul Frees, June Foray, Joan Gerber, Artie Johnson, Lyn Johnson, Diana Maddox, Charles Smith, Paul Stewart
- Music: Bill Lava
- Production Managers: Basil Cox, Bill Orcutt
- Asst. Production Managers: Armand Shaw, Harry Love
- Title Song by: Gary Lewis
- Produced by: David H. DePatie & Friz Freleng
