= Portrait of Horace Walpole =

1756 painting by Joshua Reynolds

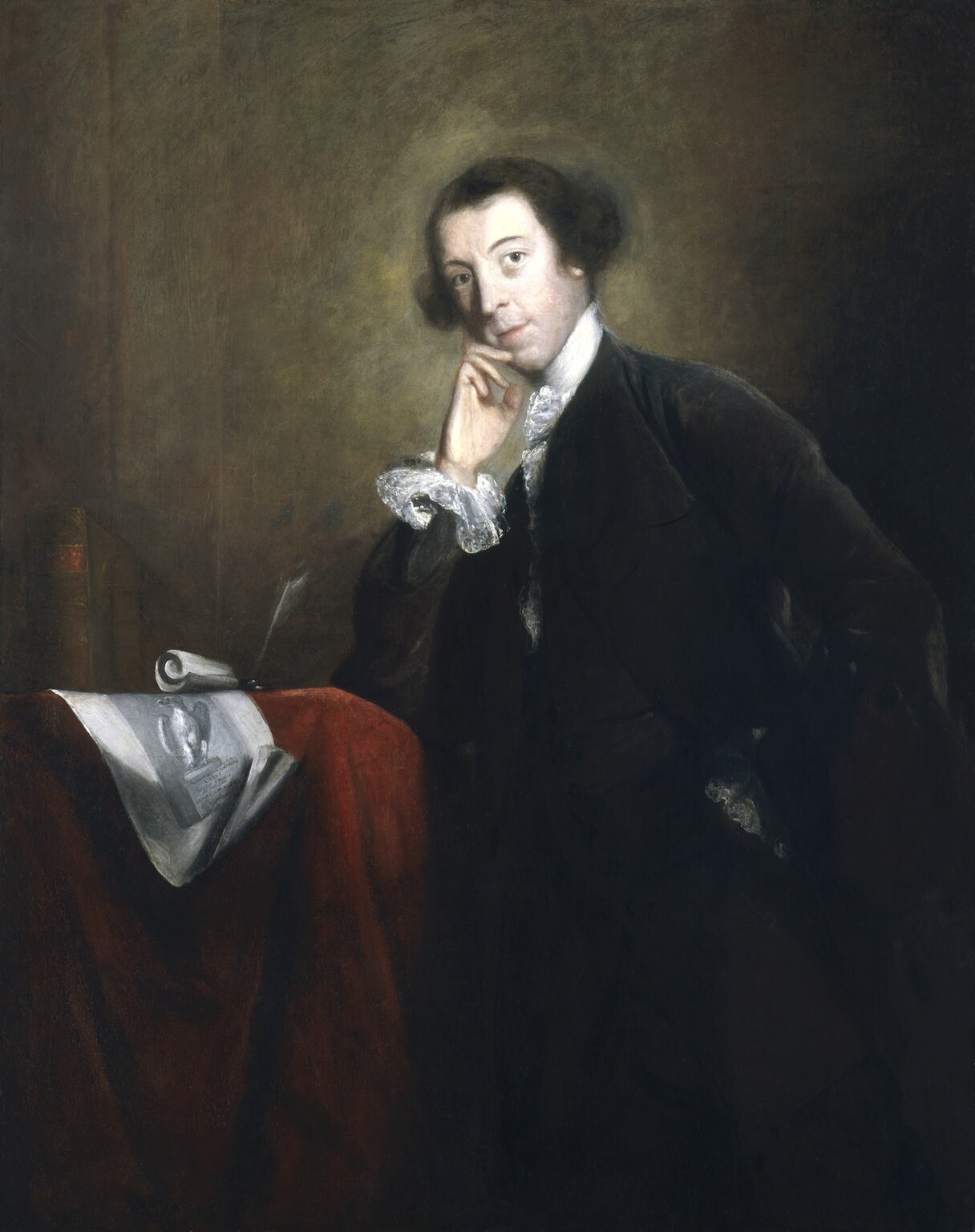
- Artist: Joshua Reynolds
- Year: c.1756
- Type: Oil on canvas, portrait painting
- Dimensions: 127.2 cm × 101.8 cm (50.1 in × 40.1 in)
- Location: National Portrait Gallery; London

Portrait of Horace Walpole is a 1756 portrait painting by the British artist Joshua Reynolds. It depicts the English politician, novelist and historian Horace Walpole. The son of the Prime Minister Robert Walpole, he was for many years a Whig Member of Parliament. As an author he is best known for his 1764 Gothic work The Castle of Otranto. He is portrayed by Reynolds as a gentleman scholar with a depiction of the Ancient Roman eagle statue he had acquired in Caracalla.

Three versions of the painting were produced. One has been in the collection of the National Portrait Gallery in London since 1999. A 1757 mezzotint was produced by the Irish engraver James MacArdell.

== Bibliography ==
- Barratt, Carrie Rebora . John Singleton Copley in America. John Singleton Copley in America. Metropolitan Museum of Art, 1995.
- Ingamells, John. National Portrait Gallery Mid-Georgian Portraits, 1760-1790. National Portrait Gallery, 2004.
- Reeve, Matthew R. Gothic Architecture and Sexuality in the Circle of Horace Walpole. Penn State Press, 2020.
