= Walter Greene =

American composer (1910–1983)

- Born: January 23, 1910; Tarkio, Missouri; USA
- Died: December 23, 1983 (aged 73); Victorville, California; USA

Walter Greene (January 23, 1910 – December 23, 1983) was a film and television composer who worked on numerous productions for over 30 years.

== Career ==
Born and raised in Tarkio, Missouri, Greene attended Tarkio College and the Horner Institute for Fine Arts. He toured with and arranged for big bands led by Orville Knapp, Freddy Martin, Horace Heidt, Wayne King, Xavier Cugat, and Harry James.

Greene entered the world of film scoring as orchestrating for MGM, with his first films being Two-Faced Woman (1941) and Abbott and Costello's Lost in a Harem (1944). He became a composer of music scores for films for the Producers Releasing Corporation studio with his first film being Crime, Inc. (1945). Other PRC films included Lash LaRue Westerns. When LaRue switched studios to Screen Guild and Howco Green continued with the series.

He earned an Academy Award nomination in 1946 for his score to the 1945 film Why Girls Leave Home. Greene composed other films such as Jesse James' Women (1954), Teenage Doll (1957), The Brain from Planet Arous (1957), Teenage Monster (1958), War of the Satellites (1958) and Thunder in Carolina (1960). Greene also provided the score for the Crown International Pictures US released of the German/Polish 1960 film First Spaceship on Venus and the Woolner Brothers US release of Hercules and the Captive Women (1963).

Greene started his career in scoring cartoons at the Walter Lantz Studio, first credited in the 1963 Greedy Gabby Gator Woody Woodpecker short. Starting with 1967's Hot Time on Ice Chilly Willy short, Greene would be the sole composer of the Lantz cartoons until the last one, which was 1972's Bye, Bye, Blackboard, in which also would be the final cartoon short with new Greene music (as mentioned below, later Pink entries would reuse his cues).

Around 1966, he started providing musical scores for some Pink Panther animated shorts (as well as those of The Inspector), replacing William Lava. Greene's scores were built around "The Pink Panther Theme" composed by Henry Mancini, creating different variations of the famous theme. Unlike the music scores composed by Bill Lava, which were custom-made for a specific entry, his compositions were generic and could be reused more freely. He is first credited in the 19th Pink Panther theatrical short, Pink, Plunk, Plink, with his final original music in Pink Panic. From Pink Posies through Therapeutic Pink, Greene's previously recorded music cues would be utilized, with some of Lava's cues being reused as well beginning with Congratulations It's Pink, although only Greene received onscreen credit, despite not having composed new cues since Pink Panic.

Greene also composed musical scores for the 1966 Tarzan TV series with some episodes linked together for feature film release and The New Three Stooges (1965).

Putting the context of his short-lived contract with DFE, he indirectly recorded some music for six Looney Tunes/Merrie Melodies shorts from 1966 to 1967. Those include A Squeak in the Deep, Feather Finger, Swing Ding Amigo, Sugar and Spies, A Taste of Catnip, and Daffy's Diner, all of these are Daffy\Speedy entries (except Sugar and Spies, which is a Road Runner\Wile E. Coyote entry).

== Death ==
Greene died on December 23, 1983, in Victorville, California.
