= Leonardo's Diary =

- Screenshot from Leonardo's Diary, 1972, by Jan Svankmajer
- Directed by: Jan Švankmajer
- Produced by: Jiri Vanek
- Starring: Vladimir Kladiva (animator), Karel Chocholin (animator)
- Edited by: Helena Lebduskova
- Production companies: Corona Cinemtografica; Studio Jirího Trnky
- Release date: 1972
- Countries: Czechoslovakia; Italy
- Language: Czech

Leonardo's Diary (Czech: Leonardův deník) is a 1972 stop-motion animated short. It features images of Leonardo da Vinci's paintings interspersed with footage of real life. As of March 2016, the 12-minute film does not currently have a rating on Rotten Tomatoes, but IMDb rates the film at 6.4, while on Filmgator the film holds a 7.0 rating.
