= Feather Finger =

- Directed by: Robert McKimson
- Story by: Michael O'Connor
- Produced by: David H. DePatie; Friz Freleng
- Starring: Mel Blanc
- Edited by: Eugene Marks
- Music by: Walter Greene
- Animation by: Manny Perez; Norm McCabe; George Grandpré; Ted Bonnicksen; Bob Matz; Don Williams
- Layouts by: Dick Ung
- Backgrounds by: Tom O'Loughlin
- Color process: Technicolor
- Production company: DePatie–Freleng Enterprises
- Distributed by: Warner Bros. Pictures
- Release date: August 20, 1966
- Running time: 6:10
- Language: English

Feather Finger is a 1966 Warner Bros. Merrie Melodies cartoon directed by Robert McKimson. It was released on August 20, 1966, and stars Daffy Duck and Speedy Gonzales.

The film is set in Texas, near the Mexico–United States border. Daffy is impoverished, and consequently agrees to defend a small town from Speedy. He is hired as a gunslinger.

== Plot ==
The story takes place in a town called Hangtree, Texas. Daffy Duck is poor and begging for charity when he sees a notice that Mayor Katt is hiring gunslingers for $15 per week. After speaking to the mayor, Daffy agrees to catch Speedy Gonzales, "the fastest mouse in all Mexico."

While waiting by the Mexico–United States border for Speedy, Daffy practices his gunslinging, and accidentally shoots himself. Speedy comes across him, and he shoots him; Speedy disappears, prompting him to comment, "I must have blown him to smithereens"; he did so, as Speedy held onto the bullet all the way to the city limits of Smithereens. Speedy returns and shoves the bullet back up the gun, causing it to explode.

Daffy tries a less direct approach by disguising himself as a Mexican; Speedy is not fooled, so this fails. Next, he offers Speedy a drink of nitroglycerin, but the mouse lets it slide down the counter and explode (Daffy: "This is getting monotonous"). He then lures Speedy with a giant cheese on a mousetrap; the mouse sees this and takes it to Mexico. Daffy, not wanting to go with him, sneaks out and falls down a gorge. His next attempt involves shooting a cannon at Speedy, which also fails, as he is smashed into a canyon wall. When Speedy offers assistance, Daffy finally captures him.

He returns him to the Mayor, who gives him only fifty-six and a quarter cents, as he only worked an hour and a half. Daffy, enraged at having no tip, promptly releases Speedy. The Mayor beats Daffy up, and he is back on the streets begging again.

== See also ==
- List of American films of 1966
- List of Daffy Duck cartoons
