= The Great De Gaulle Stone Operation =

- Directed by: Friz Freleng; Co-director: Gerry Chiniquy
- Story by: John W. Dunn
- Produced by: David DePatie; Friz Freleng
- Starring: Pat Harrington, Jr. Larry Storch; Paul Frees
- Music by: Theme music: Henry Mancini; Score: William Lava
- Animation by: Manny Perez; Don Williams; Bob Matz; Warren Batchelder; Norm McCabe; George Grandpré
- Layouts by: T.M. Yakutis
- Backgrounds by: T.M. Yakutis
- Color process: DeLuxe
- Production company: DePatie–Freleng Enterprises
- Distributed by: United Artists
- Release date: December 21, 1965
- Running time: 7' 14"
- Language: English

The Great De Gaulle Stone Operation is the first short in the Inspector series of theatrical cartoons. A total of 34 entries were produced between 1965 and 1969. The film was released in December 1965.

In the film, the Inspector and his assistant Sgt. Deux Deux are guarding are guarding an enormous diamond. The Inspector accidentally hands it over to a three-headed thief. Each of the thief's heads has a different personality, and apparently a different ethnicity. The Inspector's initial attempts to regain the diamond are failures, but the thief loses the diamond due to a hole in his pocket. The Inspector retrieves the diamond, and the thief steals it for a second time. Following a confrontation in a hotel, the inspector accidentally swallows the diamond. The diamond is soon surgically removed, and the Inspector is left wincing in pain.

== Plot ==
The Inspector has just tasked by the Commissioner to guard the De Gaulle Stone, an enormous diamond worth 10 billion francs. The Commissioner warns the Inspector of the dire consequences should he lose the diamond, but the Inspector manages to lose it in seconds, handing it to whom he thinks is his assistant, Sgt. Deux Deux, but is in fact a three-headed thief, the Matzoriley Brothers. The left (the Soviet Russian-accented "Weft") and right (the English-accented "Wight") heads argue about what to do next, and the apparently dim third head (the Chinese "Wong") tries to break up the fight, only to be clobbered by his brothers. The Inspector uses this chance to try to catch up with them, at which point they get into their car and drive away, flattening the Inspector in the process. Deux-Deux tries to pursue them himself, but he flattens the Inspector some more instead.

The Matzoriley Brothers are heading for their hideout when they see the Inspector chasing them. They shoot bullets at him, breaking his car and stripping him until he is wearing nothing but his Pink Panther underwear. The Inspector, however, remains in pursuit, undeterred; they transform their car into a flying machine and make their getaway, but not before dropping a bomb on the Inspector.

The Inspector is forced to man a plane of his own in order to pursue them. The crooks easily dispose of him with a giant fly-swatter however, and his plane crashes into the Sûreté building, destroying the Commissioner's office and earning the Inspector another ear-bashing. The trio manages to escape, but once back at their mansion, Wong discovers that their coat pocket has a hole in it, and they have managed to lose the diamond.

The Inspector returns the diamond to the Commissioner, and puts it in a safe. Unfortunately, the safe turns out to be the evil three in disguise. The Inspector and Deux-Deux pursue the thieves to a hotel, where the Inspector's attempts at catching them meet with a predictable lack of success. As the thieves barricade themselves inside a hotel room, the Inspector is shot in the eye through the keyhole from outside, but when he shows Deux-Deux what is coming through the keyhole, Deux-Deux begins whooping excitedly at what he sees (presumably Can-Can dancers). The Inspector takes a second look and is shot again. When the Inspector announces he will shoot at the count of three, the Matzoriley Brothers escape in their car, knocking down the door and flattening the Inspector, who fires a bullet that only drops to the ground.

The three are finally surrounded at their hideout by the Inspector, Deux-Deux, and a number of backup units. Realizing that they are finished, Wong places the diamond in a glass of water, within which it is inconspicuous. The Inspector, Deux-Deux, and the other officers break in, and apprehend the thieves. While the others search for the missing diamond, the Inspector decides to help himself to the nearby glass of water, and swallows the diamond in the process. He is then rushed to the hospital where the De Gaulle diamond is surgically removed and given to the assisting nurse, whom is actually the Matzoriley Brothers in disguise. The Inspector touches the area of the cut in his surgery, where the diamond was removed, and winces in pain, when he describes how he feels about the diamond escapade.

== Production notes ==
The Great De Gaulle Stone Operation was released with the James Bond film Thunderball during its original theatrical run. The title is a parody of the medical condition gallstones as well as a reference to then-French President, Charles de Gaulle.

The Matzoriley Brothers first appeared as unnamed characters in the opening credits of A Shot in the Dark, and were seen again in The Super 6, another cartoon series produced in 1966 by DePatie–Freleng Enterprises. They were referred to in the series as "The Brothers Matzoriley."

The Pink Panther Show contained a laugh track when the Pink Panther cartoons were broadcast on NBC-TV. Currently, the laugh-tracked version airs on the Spanish language Boomerang TV channel.

== See also ==
- List of The Pink Panther cartoons
