= Daffy's Diner =

- Directed by: Robert McKimson
- Story by: Michael O'Connor
- Produced by: David H. DePatie; Friz Freleng
- Starring: Mel Blanc
- Edited by: Lee Gunther
- Music by: Walter Greene
- Animation by: Manny Perez; Warren Batchelder; Ted Bonnicksen; Art Leonardi; Don Williams; Bob Matz; Norm McCabe
- Layouts by: Dick Ung
- Backgrounds by: Tom O'Loughlin
- Color process: Technicolor
- Production company: DePatie–Freleng Enterprises
- Distributed by: Warner Bros. Pictures; The Vitaphone Corporation
- Release date: January 21, 1967
- Running time: 6:12
- Language: English

Daffy's Diner is a 1967 Warner Bros. Merrie Melodies cartoon directed by Robert McKimson. The short was released on January 21, 1967, and stars Daffy Duck and Speedy Gonzales. It was the final Warner Bros. cartoon to be produced by DePatie–Freleng Enterprises, as well as the final Warner Bros. cartoon to feature music by Walter Greene.

== Plot ==
Daffy runs a diner near Guadalajara, serving mouseburgers to cats with rubber mice as substitutes for actual mice, as he hasn't seen one in ages. However, one angry cat named El Supremo discovers the trick and demands a real mouseburger. So at gunpoint, Daffy goes to find a mouse. At this point, Daffy encounters Speedy, begging for food, whom he tries to cook.

The mouse discovers his intentions and escapes to the desert, with Daffy in hot pursuit. Daffy is foiled each time by Speedy running up a cactus, Daffy accidentally knocking a cactus on himself, and being scared by Speedy into a trash can, prompting the waste management official to think he has gone crazy after Daffy tells him to put him down from within the can. (Speedy doesn't appear for the rest of the short afterwards.)

Daffy returns and tries to escape, but El Supremo stops him. Finally, El Supremo demands his burger within two minutes, forcing Daffy to serve himself as a replacement. He states, "You never know what you'll do, until you've got a gun pointed at your head" (inspired by a line Daffy used in Golden Yeggs).
