= Amentü Gemisi Nasıl Yürüdü =

- Directed by: Tonguç Yaşar
- Written by: Sezer Tansuğ
- Release date: 1969
- Running time: 3 minutes 15 seconds
- Country: Turkey
- Language: Turkish

Amentü Gemisi Nasıl Yürüdü is a 1969 Turkish animated short film directed by Tonguç Yaşar.

== Awards ==
- 1970 International Adana Golden Boll Film Festival, Best Short
- 1973 Annecy International Animated Film Festival, Short films out of competition
