= Upjohn's Triangle of Health =

Upjohn's Triangle was a short-lived educational series of animations produced in the late 1960s and again in the late 1970s by The Walt Disney Company's educational media division and sponsored by the Upjohn pharmaceutical company. This series focused on health. This series is similar to the What Should I Do? series.

== Films ==
=== 1968 ===
- Understanding Stress and Strain
- Steps Toward Maturity and Health

=== 1969 ===
- The Social Side of Health
- Physical Fitness and Good Health

=== 1979 ===
- Understanding Alcohol Use and Abuse

=== 1992 ===
Note: The following episodes were live-action only.

- Keeping the Balance
- Moving On
- Personal Challenge
- True Friends

== See also ==
- List of Disney animated shorts
