= A Game with Stones =

1965 film by Jan Švankmajer

- Directed by: Jan Švankmajer
- Written by: Jan Švankmajer
- Produced by: Alexander Hans Puluj
- Cinematography: Peter Puluj
- Edited by: Jan Švankmajer
- Production company: Studio A
- Release date: 1965
- Running time: 9 minutes
- Country: Austria

A Game with Stones (German: Spiel mit Steinen; Czech: Hra s kameny) is a 1965 short animated film by Czech animator Jan Švankmajer. It utilizes stop-motion animation.

== Themes ==
The animator uses a motif of clocks and stones, accompanied by bizarre sounds and a xylophone/music box score. The film makes use of texture and pattern, with an emphasis on the dichotomy of black and white. The use of old and antique objects reappears in many of the filmmaker's later works.

== Production ==
The film was Švankmajer's first collaboration with Austrian producer Alexander Hans Puluj and cinematographer Peter Puluj, who were both born in Prague. They were sons of a famous physicist Ivan Puluj. The whole film was shot in an Austrian farmhouse.
