= What Should I Do? =

What Should I Do? is a short-lived educational series focusing on moral topics originally produced in animation during the late 1960s and early 1970s by The Walt Disney Company's educational media division. Additional live-action entries were produced in 1992. What Should I Do? films were featured in some episodes of Donald Duck Presents.

== Films ==
1969

- The Fight (updated in 1992)
- The Game (updated in 1992)

1970

- The New Girl
- The Lunch Money
- The Project

1992 (live-action)

- The Baseball Cards
- The Lunch Group
- The Mural
- The Play

== See also ==
- Upjohn's Triangle of Health
