= The Castle of Otranto =

1764 Gothic novel by Horace Walpole

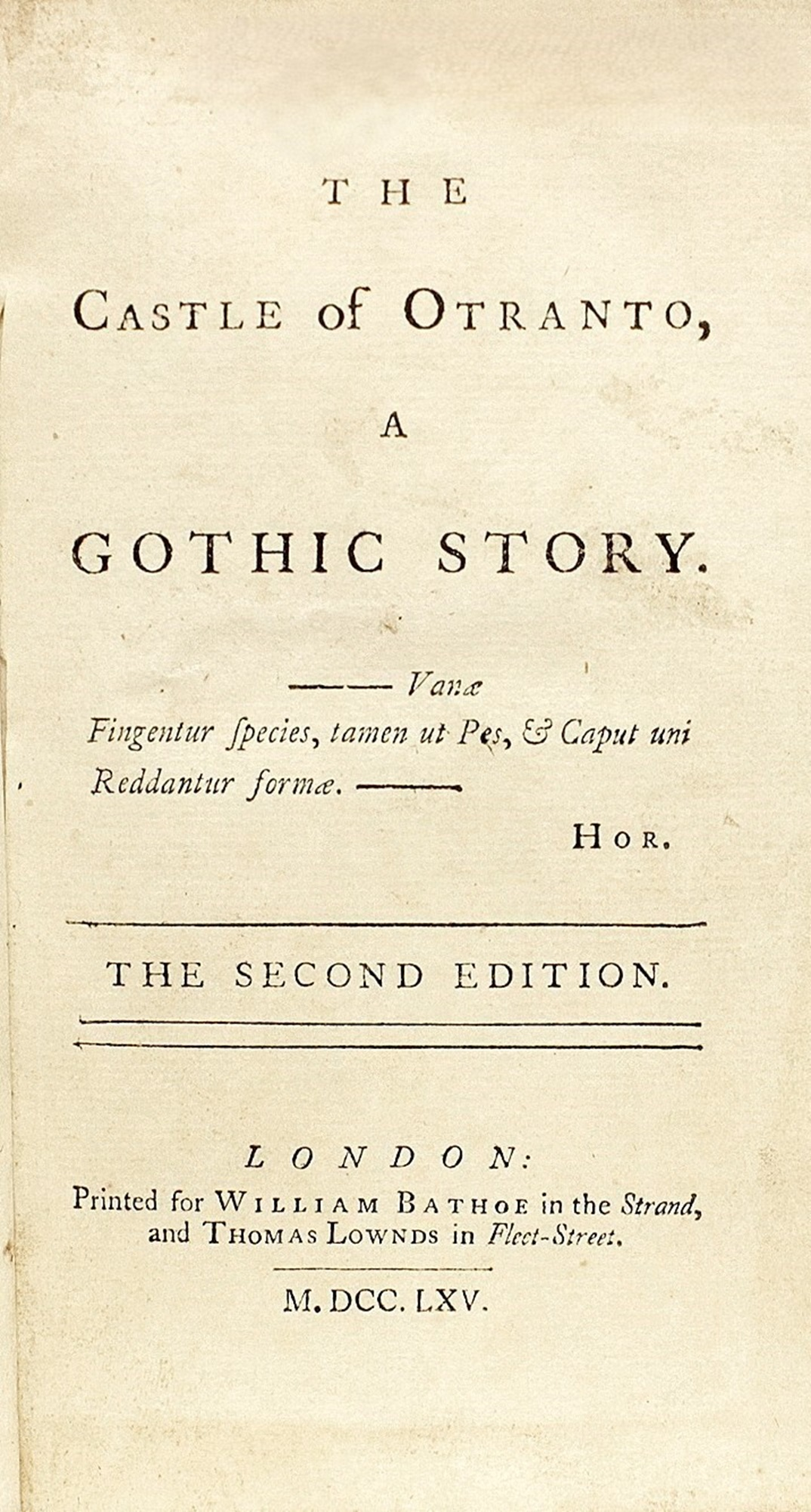
- Title page from the second edition
- Author: Horace Walpole
- Language: English
- Genre: Gothic, horror novel
- Publication date: 24 December 1764
- Publication place: England
- Text: The Castle of Otranto at Wikisource

The Castle of Otranto is a novel written by the British Whig politician and historian Horace Walpole. First published in 1764, it is generally regarded as the first Gothic novel. In the second edition, Walpole applied the word 'Gothic' to the novel in the subtitle – A Gothic Story. Set in a haunted castle, the novel merged medievalism and terror in a style that has endured ever since. The aesthetic of the book has shaped modern-day Gothic romance/horror books, films, art, music, and the Goth subculture.

Walpole was inspired to write the story after a nightmare he had at his Gothic Revival home, Strawberry Hill House, in Twickenham, southwest London. Claiming he saw a ghost in the nightmare—which featured a "gigantic hand in armour"—Walpole incorporated imagery from this into the novel, and also drew on his knowledge of medieval history.

The novel initiated a literary genre that would become extremely popular in the later 18th and throughout the 19th century, with authors such as Clara Reeve, Ann Radcliffe, William Thomas Beckford, Matthew Lewis, Mary Shelley, Bram Stoker, Edgar Allan Poe, Robert Louis Stevenson, and George du Maurier.

== History ==
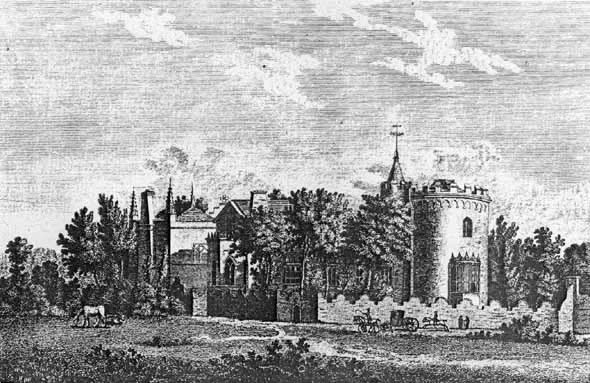
The novel was inspired by a nightmare Walpole had at Strawberry Hill House (18th-century engraving of the Gothic villa pictured).

The Castle of Otranto was written in 1764 during Horace Walpole's tenure as MP for King's Lynn. Walpole was fascinated with medieval history; in 1749 he had begun construction on his own Gothic castle, Strawberry Hill House.

The initial edition was titled in full: The Castle of Otranto, A Story. Translated by William Marshal, Gent. From the Original Italian of Onuphrio Muralto, Canon of the Church of St. Nicholas at Otranto. This first edition purported to be a translation of a book printed at Naples in 1529 and recently rediscovered in the library of "an ancient Catholic family in the north of England". He employed an archaic style of writing to reinforce this conceit.

The Italian book, it was claimed, derived from a story still older, dating back perhaps as far as the Crusades. This Italian book, along with alleged author "Onuphrio Muralto", were Walpole's fictional creations, and "William Marshal" his pseudonym.

In the second and subsequent editions, Walpole acknowledged authorship of the work, writing: "The favourable manner in which this little piece has been received by the public, calls upon the author to explain the grounds on which he composed it" as "an attempt to blend the two kinds of romance, the ancient and the modern. In the former all was imagination and improbability: in the latter, nature is always intended to be, and sometimes has been, copied with success...." There was some debate at the time about the function of literature; that is, whether works of fiction should be representative of life or more purely imaginative (i.e., natural vs. romantic). The first edition was well received by some reviewers who understood the novel as belonging to medieval fiction, "between 1095, the era of the First Crusade, and 1243, the date of the last", as the first preface states; and some referred to Walpole as an "ingenious translator". Following Walpole's admission of authorship, however, many critics were loath to lavish much praise on the work and dismissed it as absurd, fluffy, romantic fiction, or even unsavory or immoral.

In his 1924 edition of The Castle of Otranto, Montague Summers showed that the life story of Manfred of Sicily inspired some details of the plot. The real medieval castle of Otranto was among Manfred's possessions. He repeated the assertion in 1938 in The Gothic Quest.

== Plot ==
The Castle of Otranto tells the story of Manfred, lord of the castle, and his family. The book begins on the wedding day of his sickly son Conrad and princess Isabella. Shortly before the wedding, however, Conrad is crushed to death by a gigantic helmet that falls on him from above. This inexplicable event is particularly ominous in light of an ancient prophecy: "That the castle and lordship of Otranto should pass from the present family, whenever the real owner should be grown too large to inhabit it." Manfred, terrified that Conrad's death signals the beginning of the end for his line, resolves to avert destruction by marrying Isabella himself while divorcing his current wife, Hippolita, who he feels has failed to bear him a proper heir in light of the sickly condition of Conrad before his untimely death.

However, as Manfred attempts to marry Isabella, she escapes to a church with the aid of a peasant named Theodore, who had correctly identified the giant helmet that had killed Conrad as having come from the giant statue standing before the church. Manfred accuses Theodore of having sorcerous responsibility for the helmet having been summoned. Manfred orders Theodore's death while talking to the friar Jerome, who ensured Isabella's safety at the church. When Theodore removes his shirt to be killed, Jerome recognizes a mark below his shoulder and identifies Theodore as his own son, and thus being of noble birth. Jerome, who has revealed himself to be of noble rank, begs for his son's life, but Manfred says Jerome must either give up the princess or his son's life. They are interrupted by a trumpet and the entrance of knights from another kingdom who want to deliver Isabella to her father, Frederic, along with the castle, as Frederic has a stronger claim to it (another reason Manfred wishes to wed Isabella). This leads the knights and Manfred to race to find Isabella.

Theodore, having been locked in a tower by Manfred, is freed by Manfred's daughter, Matilda. He races to the underground church and finds Isabella. He hides her in a cave and blocks it to protect her from Manfred and ends up fighting one of the mysterious knights. Theodore badly injures the knight, who turns out to be Isabella's father, Frederic. With that, they all go up to the castle to work things out. Frederic falls in love with Matilda, and he and Manfred make a deal to marry each other's daughters. However, Frederic backs out after being warned by an apparition of a skeleton.

Manfred, suspecting that Isabella is meeting Theodore in a tryst in the church, takes a knife into the church, where Matilda is meeting Theodore. Thinking his own daughter is Isabella, he stabs her. Theodore is then revealed to be the true prince of Otranto as Matilda dies, leaving Manfred to repent. A giant ghostly form appears, declares the prophecy fulfilled, and shatters the castle walls.

Manfred abdicates the principality and retires to religion along with Hippolita. Theodore becomes prince of the remains of the castle and is married to Isabella, for she is the only one who can truly understand his sorrow.

== Characters ==
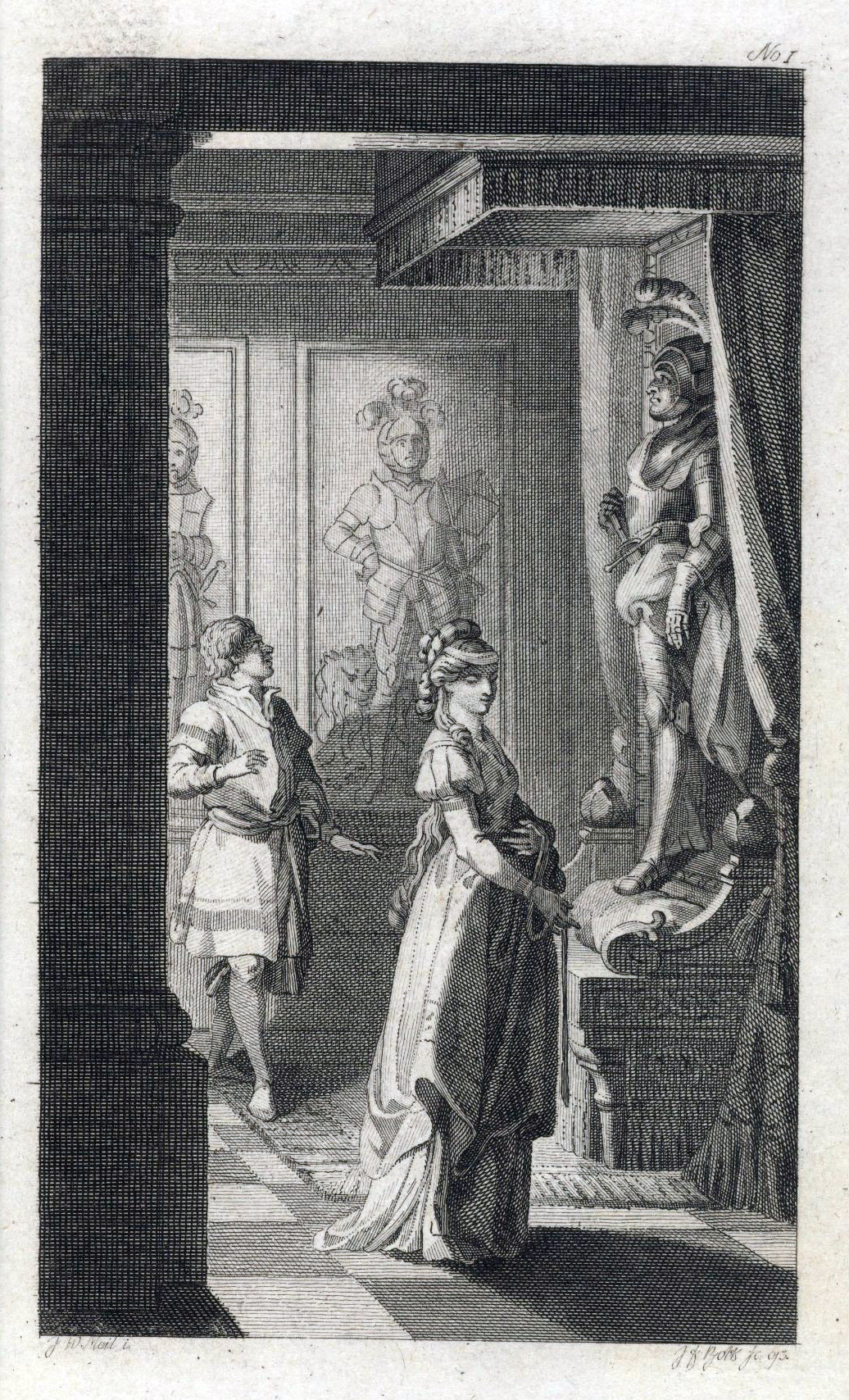
Illustration from a 1794 German edition

- Manfred – the lord of the Castle of Otranto. He is the father of Conrad and Matilda, and the husband of Hippolita. After his son is killed by the falling helmet, he becomes obsessed with the idea of ending his marriage with Hippolita in pursuit of the much younger Isabella, who was supposed to marry his son. Manfred serves as the prime antagonist of the novel; he is the dictatorial ruler and father and drives the plot forward in a depiction of deranged cruelty visited upon his children.
- Hippolita – the wife of Manfred and the mother of Conrad and Matilda. After having lost her son, she is left with just Matilda to combat the tyrannical turn of mind that her husband displays. Manfred intends to divorce her due to her sterility and on the grounds that their marriage is in fact false because they are actually related. Faced with the threat of divorce, Hippolita is mournful yet submissive to the will of her husband. She acts as a sort of enabler to her husband, putting aside her morals and happiness so that her husband can get what he wants.
- Conrad – the fifteen-year-old son of Manfred and Hippolita and the younger brother of Matilda. In the first pages of the novel, he is crushed by a giant helmet on his way to his wedding with Isabella.
- Matilda – Matilda is the daughter of Hippolita and the oppressive Manfred. She falls in love with Theodore, much to her chagrin since it is a love unsanctioned by her parents. Upon the appearance of Frederic, things become even more complicated as Frederic lusts after Matilda. She serves as the forbidden woman, a facet of Gothic literature. Frederic and Manfred each make plans to marry the other's daughter, crushing Matilda's hope of being with Theodore. At the end of the novel, she is mistakenly stabbed by her father.
- Isabella – the daughter of Frederic and the fiancée of Conrad (at the beginning of the novel). After the death of Conrad, she makes it clear that, although she did not love Conrad, she would have far preferred being betrothed to him than to his father, who pursues her throughout the novel. Isabella and Matilda have a brief argument concerning the fact they both have feelings for Theodore. After the death of Matilda, Theodore settles for Isabella and the two become the lord and lady of the castle.
- Theodore – at the beginning of the novel, Theodore appears to be a minor character, whose role is purely to point out the significance of the helmet as a link to the fulfillment of the prophecy. However, he emerges as a main character after Manfred orders him to be imprisoned within the helmet for his insolence, and he escapes and helps Isabella to escape from the castle through a trapdoor. He is revealed later in the novel to be the lost son of Friar Jerome. Theodore proceeds to protect Isabella from the wanton lust of Manfred. He captures the hearts of both Isabella and Matilda, but settles for Isabella after Matilda's death. He also later goes on to rule the Castle of Otranto.
- Friar Jerome – the friar at the monastery near the Castle of Otranto. Manfred attempts to manipulate him into both supporting his plan to divorce his wife and persuading his wife to go along with this plan. It is later discovered that he is Theodore's father.
- Frederic – the long-lost father of Isabella who appears late into the novel. He opposes Manfred at first, until he settles on a deal to marry Matilda.
- Bianca – the servant of Matilda who serves as a comic relief of the otherwise highly melodramatic novel.
- Diego and Jaquez – these two, like Bianca, are other servants in the Castle of Otranto.

== Literary elements ==
In the preface of the second edition, Walpole claims the novel is "an attempt to blend the two kinds of romance, the ancient and the modern." He defines the "ancient" romance by its fantastic nature ("its imagination and improbability") while defining the "modern" romance as more deeply rooted in literary realism ("a strict adherence to common life," in his words). By combining fantastic situations (helmets falling from the sky, walking portraits, etc.) with supposedly real people acting in a "natural" manner, Walpole created a new and distinct style of literary fiction, which has frequently been cited as a template for all subsequent gothic novels. The Monthly Review stated that for "[t]hose who can digest the absurdities of Gothic fiction" Otranto offered "considerable entertainment".

The Castle of Otranto is widely regarded as the first Gothic novel, and, with its knights, villains, wronged maidens, haunted corridors and things that go bump in the night, is the spiritual godfather of Frankenstein and Dracula, the creaking floorboards of Edgar Allan Poe and the shifting stairs and walking portraits of Harry Potter's Hogwarts.

— Strawberry Hill, Horace Walpole's fantasy castle, to open its doors again, The Guardian.

=== Gothic elements ===
Set in a crumbling castle with all the now-classic gothic trappings (secret passageways, bleeding statues, unexplained noises and talking portraits), it introduced the haunted house as a symbol of cultural decay or change.

— Jane Bradley in The Guardian.

The Castle of Otranto is the first supernatural English novel and is a singularly influential work of Gothic fiction. It blends elements of realist fiction with the supernatural and fantastical, establishing many of the plot devices and character types that would become typical of the Gothic novel: secret passages, clanging trapdoors, pictures beginning to move, and doors closing by themselves. The poet Thomas Gray told Walpole that the novel made "some of us cry a little, and all in general afraid to go to bed o’nights."

=== The Castle of Otranto and Shakespeare ===
The first and most obvious connection to William Shakespeare is presented by Horace Walpole himself, in the preface to the second edition of Otranto, in which he "praises Shakespeare as a truly original genius and the exemplar of imaginative liberty, as a part of a defense of Otranto's design". Elsewhere, Walpole's several allusions to works by Shakespeare further emphasize the connection he wishes to draw between his own work and Shakespeare's. For example, in Hamlet, "Hamlet's encounter with the Ghost becomes for Walpole a template for terror".

Walpole presents a "more fragmented recasting" of the Ghost in Hamlet, which had served as a representation of the "now unsanctioned, but still popular Catholic view of ghosts as speakers of truth" for Shakespeare. The Catholic elements at play within both Hamlet and Otranto are invoked to represent a further sense of wonder and mystery to the Protestant audiences of both works. The Catholic element was a necessary facet of the "template of terror" that Walpole meant to invoke.

The allusion to Hamlet's experience with the Ghost is meant not only as a "template of terror," but also to make readers feel as if they are watching the play itself, and Walpole does this on three occasions. First, he posits Manfred's encounter with the animated portrait of Ricardo as a connection to the Ghost's initial appearance to Hamlet. Second, when Friar Jerome informs Theodore of the dangers to be found in Otranto and calls for him to take revenge, this is a direct allusion to the Ghost's demand to Hamlet to remember him. Third, Frederic's encounter with the skeletal apparition parallels the final appearance of the Ghost in Hamlet.

The violent question of bloodlines and succession serves as a key element in many of Shakespeare's plays, from Hamlet to Richard II and Macbeth, and it is clearly one of the major concerns of Otranto. The link to Hamlet is strengthened even more because of the incest that is also at play in Otranto. "In Otranto, the castle and its labyrinths become grounds for incest that signal the dissolution of familial bonds", which is also a major point of issue in Hamlet since Hamlet's mother (Gertrude) and his uncle (Claudius) were, in a way, related before their marriage. Both Hamlet and Otranto are literary springboards for discussion of the questions of marriage, as the question of Henry VIII's annulment of his marriage and later marriage to Anne Boleyn were still heated topics of controversy. Henry VIII had married his brother's wife Catherine of Aragon and later dissolved that marriage due to Catherine's inability to produce a male heir who lived to adulthood. Similarly, Otranto revolves around "a larger sexual contest to secure lineage".

The final connection between Otranto and Shakespeare lies in the role that the servants play. Like Shakespeare, Walpole aims to create a "mixture of comedy and tragedy," and one of the ways he does so is by using the minor, servant characters (such as Bianca) as comic relief. This is a trope that Walpole takes from Shakespeare as, for example, Shakespeare's mechanicals from A Midsummer Night's Dream also serve as the key comic element in the play.

=== Queer elements ===
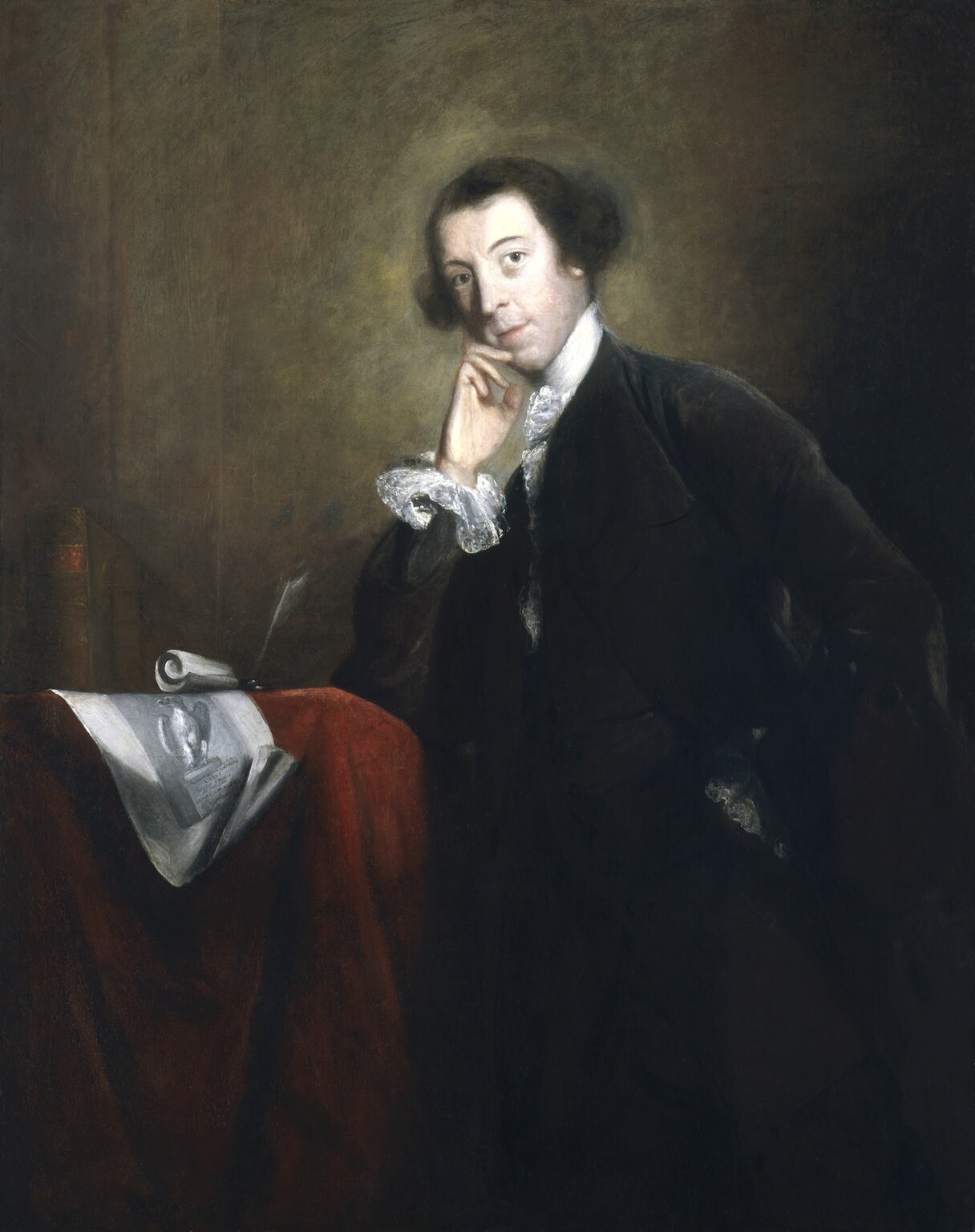
Portrait of Horace Walpole by Joshua Reynolds, 1756

Horace Walpole's aesthetic productions, especially his home at Strawberry Hill House, have been interpreted through the lens of queer theory and described as camp. The Castle of Otranto is seen as establishing a literary foundation in which sexual desire and transgression is a defining thematic undercurrent of the new genre of the Gothic. Max Fincher has written that Manfred is preoccupied with the threat of his identity being discovered in a way that parallels the fear of homoerotic desire being discovered. He argues that misogyny in the novel is an attempt to project manliness, overcompensating for the author's or character's fears of queerness or weakness. Because of these fears, he argues, the book presents non-heteronormative behavior as "unnatural and demonic."

== Impact and adaptations ==
=== Literary ===
Otranto is generally credited with creating the entire Gothic novel genre. It was a smash hit in its day, until the author revealed that it was purely satirical fiction rather than an actual adaptation of medieval text. At that point, the critics and populace who had praised it turned on the book, claiming it was superficial, and other pejoratives generally assigned to romantic novels, which were seen as inferior in Britain at that time. But its impact was dramatic. The novelist Clara Reeve wrote The Old English Baron (1777) as a response, claiming she was taking Walpole's plot and adapting it to the demands of the time by balancing fantastic elements with 18th-century realism. She explained:

This Story is the literary offspring of The Castle of Otranto, written upon the same plan, with a design to unite the most attractive and interesting circumstances of the ancient Romance and modern Novel. The question now arose whether supernatural events that were not as evidently absurd as Walpole's would not lead the simpler minds to believe them possible.

After a number of other novels were added to the budding Gothic genre, the teenage author Matthew Lewis published The Monk (1796), a novel that directly imitated the formula of Otranto, but took it to such an extreme that some have interpreted the novel as parody.

=== Adaptations ===
In 1948, writer Frank Belknap Long and artist Allen Ulmer adapted the novel into a 7-page comic story for the first issue of the American Comics Group horror anthology Adventures into the Unknown.

Jan Švankmajer directed the surrealist short film Castle of Otranto (1977) based on the novel. It takes the form of a pseudo-documentary frame story in live action with an abridged adaptation of the story itself presented in cut-out animation in the style of Gothic art.

== Bibliography ==
=== Editions ===
- Fairclough, Peter (ed.), Three Gothic Novels (Harmondsworth: Penguin, 1968) ISBN 0140430369. With an introduction by Mario Praz. Includes William Beckford's Vathek and Mary Shelley's Frankenstein (1832 text) alongside The Castle of Otranto.
- Walpole, Horace, The Castle of Otranto (Oxford: Oxford University Press, 2014) ISBN 9780198704447. With an introduction and note by Nick Groom.
- Walpole, Horace, The Castle of Otranto (Macmillan Publishing Company, 1963). "With Sir Walter Scott's Introduction of 1821 and a New Introduction by Marvin Mudrick."

=== Biographies and correspondence ===
- Mowl, Timothy Horace Walpole: The Great Outsider (London: Faber and Faber, 2011) ISBN 9780571269211.
- Walpole, Horace Selected Letters (London: Everyman's Library, 2017) ISBN 9781841593500. Edited by Stephen Clarke.

=== Criticism ===
==== Articles ====
- Cohenour, Gretchen. "A Man's Home is His Castle: Bloodlines and The Castle of Otranto". EAPSU Journal of Critical and Creative Work. Volume 5 (2008): 73–87.
- Cohenour, Gretchen. "Eighteenth Century Gothic Novels and Gendered Spaces: What's Left to Say?" Diss: University of Rhode Island, 2008. ProQuest LLC, 2008.
- Hamm, Robert B. "Hamlet and Horace Walpole’s The Castle of Otranto". SEL Studies in English Literature 1500–1900. Volume 49 (2009): 667–692.
- (IT) Carlo Stasi, Otranto e l'Inghilterra (episodi bellici in Puglia e nel Salento), in Note di Storia e Cultura Salentina, anno XV, pp. 127–159, (Argo, Lecce, 2003)
- (IT) Carlo Stasi, Otranto nel Mondo, in Note di Storia e Cultura Salentina, anno XVI, pp. 207–224, (Argo, Lecce, 2004)

==== Monographs ====
- Mellor, Anne K. Mary Shelley: Her Life, Her Fiction, Her Monsters. New York: Routledge, 1988. 196–198.
- (IT) Carlo Stasi, Otranto nel Mondo, dal 'Castello' di Walpole al 'Barone' di Voltaire (Editrice Salentina, Galatina 2018) ISBN 9788831964067
