= Picnic with Weissmann =

- Directed by: Jan Švankmajer
- Written by: Jan Švankmajer
- Cinematography: Peter Puluj
- Edited by: Jan Švankmajer
- Release date: 1968
- Running time: 11 minutes
- Country: Austria
- Language: German

Picnic with Weissmann (German: Picknick mit Weissman) is a 1968 Austrian animated short film by Jan Švankmajer.

== Plot ==
A phonograph winds itself up and lets its needle touch the record. It is one of many animate objects placed on a grassy field surrounded by trees, including three chairs (two wicker, one wooden), a double-drawered desk where the chairs play cards, and a lounge on where a suit of clothes crosses its legs and reclines between two bowls, one empty and the other full of prunes. A snail briefly crawls onto the phonograph's record, causing a bump every time the needle crosses it before crawling away. Also housed on the lawn is a battered wooden chess set, which begins to play itself.

A wardrobe containing black and white photographs of a young woman and a young man is also among the animate objects. A spade unhooks itself from the wardrobe and begins cutting the turf in front of it. The phonograph eventually reaches the end of its record. It stops playing and raises the needle, allowing the record to roll back to its cover. Another record slips out of its cover and rolls over to the phonograph to be played. As the phonograph winds up, the chairs are shown to be turning more cards face up as they play. The spade is then seen beginning to dig the turf it has loosened, creating a small hole. The cards on the desk are stacked up and put away into one of the desk's drawers. The suit sits up on its elbows and takes a prune from the bowl on its right. The fruit crosses through the right sleeve and across the inside of the shirt, before the seed passes out of the left sleeve and into the empty bowl on the suit's left side. The suit repeats this process until all of the prunes have been "eaten", then crosses its legs in the other direction.

The chess set is seen continuing to play itself, knocking pieces off the board as they pile up next to it. The desk's left drawer opens and a balloon climbs out, affixing itself to the handle. The drawer opens and closes repeatedly to inflate the balloon, during which the inside of the drawer shows a picture of a naked woman. When the balloon is fully inflated, a string climbs out of the drawer and ties the balloon closed, whereupon the balloon falls off. The chairs proceed to kick and pass the balloon back and forth. The balloon is also bounced between the opening and closing drawers of the desk. The wooden chair is then seen bouncing the balloon in its lap before passing it to one of the wicker chairs, who tosses the balloon into the hole that the spade is digging, which has since become deeper. Sensing the disturbance, the spade enters the hole as the phonograph stops playing. The spade investigates the balloon before tossing it out of the hole, where it lands on the phonograph's needle, puncturing it.

The phonograph casts the deflated balloon aside and allows the record to roll back to its cover. A third record rolls out of its cover and places itself on the phonograph, which winds up and proceeds to play. The suit crosses his legs in a different direction as itself and the lounge disappear down a path into the woods. As the sun begins setting, the chairs are seen marching to the top of a large hill of stones. The chairs then proceed to tumble to the bottom of the pile, the wicker chairs landing atop the wooden chair as they run off into the woods. The chess set continues playing itself until only the kings remain, which try to break the stalemate.

An old-fashioned camera and its tripod take themselves down from the wardrobe. After the tripod extends its legs, the camera takes a series of pictures of the suit, the chairs, the lounge, the desk, the phonograph, and the wardrobe in various combinations of "family photographs". These new family photographs end up replacing the old photographs of the man and woman, which are shown torn up on the ground. The spade finally finishes digging, having constructed a grave in front of the wardrobe. The phonograph stops playing for a final time, just before it is covered with autumn leaves. As all the trees in the forest are revealed to be bare, the chess set (still consisting of the kings in a drawn position), the wicker chairs, the suit, the lounge, the wooden chair, and the desk are similarly covered by autumn leaves. With all of the other objects buried, the spade turns to the wardrobe, which unlocks itself and opens its doors. A man in white long underwear, bound and gagged, falls out of the wardrobe and into the grave, whereupon the spade begins piling dirt on top of him.

== Reception ==
CineMagazine rated the film 3 stars.
