= The Inspector =

American animated film series

- Series title card
- Directed by: Friz Freleng; Gerry Chiniquy; Robert McKimson; George Singer
- Story by: John W. Dunn; Michael O'Connor; Jim Ryan; Tony Benedict; Jack Miller; David Detiege
- Based on: Inspector Clouseau by Blake Edwards and Maurice Richlin
- Produced by: David H. DePatie; Friz Freleng
- Starring: Pat Harrington Jr.; Paul Frees; Don Messick; Larry Storch; Marvin Miller; Mark Skor
- Music by: William Lava; Walter Greene (Note: Original themes composed by Henry Mancini)
- Color process: Technicolor
- Production companies: DePatie–Freleng Enterprises; The Mirisch Company
- Distributed by: United Artists
- Running time: 5-6 minutes
- Country: United States
- Language: English

The Inspector is an American series of 34 theatrical cartoon shorts produced between 1965 and 1969 by DePatie–Freleng Enterprises and released through United Artists. The cartoons are dedicated to an animated version of Inspector Clouseau comically battling against a rogues' gallery of internationally styled villains.

Outside of the episode titles, much of the humor in these shorts is derived in part from the surreality of the villains and situations, and also from the stylized animated slapstick, the brunt of which is endured by the Inspector, who is often bested by his nemeses, forcing him to face the wrath of his supervisor, the blustery and ill-tempered Commissioner (based on Herbert Lom's portrayal of Commissioner Dreyfus, if somewhat more violent) who holds him in well-deserved contempt.

== Characters ==
=== The Inspector ===
The Inspector is a senior detective for the Sûreté and assisted in most earlier episodes by Sergeant Deux-Deux, who is voiced by Pat Harrington Jr.; In The Pink Panther Show bumpers, he is instead voiced by Marvin Miller. Though his actual name is never mentioned, the character is clearly based on Inspector Jacques Clouseau from The Pink Panther films (to the point its design was later reused in the opening credits of the 1968 Inspector Clouseau film, establishing that both inspectors are, in fact, one and the same). But in slight contrast to the completely inept live-action Clouseau, the animated unnamed Inspector is more competent, though still prone to bad luck and poor judgment.

=== Sergeant Deux-Deux ===
The Inspector's young and timid assistant, Sergeant Deux-Deux (pronounced "Doo-Doo"), is a slow-talking Spaniard and gendarme. Like the Inspector, he is voiced by Pat Harrington Jr., and in bumpers for The Pink Panther Show, he is voiced by Marvin Miller; in "La Feet's Defeat", he is instead voiced by Don Messick, and the character is given a younger appearance and more naive personality. He frequently utters the exclamation "Jole Frijoles" ("Holy Beans") in exciting or extreme situations, and often replies to the Inspector in his native tongue, saying "Sí", only to be admonished by the Inspector who often tells him, "Don't say 'sí', say 'oui'", which sometimes leads to confusing situations between the two. Deux Deux usually responded afterwards by intoning: "Sí, I mean oui, Inspector." In one cartoon, Deux Deux said "ouisick" instead of "seasick". On a couple of occasions, when the Inspector is incapacitated, Deux-Deux himself almost effortlessly manages to apprehend the culprit. He thinks of the Inspector as his hero.

=== The Commissioner ===
The Commissioner, as his name implies, is the commissioner of the French police force and the boss of the Inspector and Sgt. Deux-Deux. The Commissioner is a heavily built, blustery, ill-tempered, bullying, bald man dressed in a suit and a black tie. He was voiced by Larry Storch in his first two appearances, then by Paul Frees from 1966 to 1967 (sans 1967's "Canadian Can-Can", where he is voiced by Mark Skor), and by Marvin Miller in all remaining appearances. He is usually angry in his interactions with the Inspector, for instance because of the Inspector's failure to complete his missions or because the Inspector has inadvertently caused him physical harm. The short "That's No Lady - That's Notre Dame" introduces his wife (voiced by Diana Maddox) who refers to him as 'Henri'. Despite the Inspector's general incompetence (which the Commissioner acknowledges) the Commissioner never actually fires him, or at least not permanently.

== Production ==
Pat Harrington Jr. provided voices for both the Inspector and Deux-Deux; (in "La Feet's Defeat", Deux-Deux is voiced by Don Messick and sports a younger, more naive appearance.) The Commissioner was voiced by Larry Storch for his first two appearances, before Paul Frees took on the role up until "Bomb Voyage", and voiced the character one last time in "Le Escape Goat". In "Canadian Can-Can", the Commissioner is voiced by Mark Skor, who also voiced the evil face of Two-Faced Harry, the short's antagonist. The Commissioner was then voiced by Marvin Miller for his remaining appearances. Miller also assumed the role of both the Inspector and Sgt. Deux-Deux in the wraparound bumpers produced for the inaugural season of The Pink Panther Show.

The first entry in the series, The Great De Gaulle Stone Operation, preceded screenings of the 1965 James Bond film Thunderball.

The Inspector character design remained basically the same throughout the DePatie–Freleng shorts, and was used in the opening credit sequence of the 1968 live-action film Inspector Clouseau (with Alan Arkin as Clouseau), but in the opening titles of later Pink Panther features beginning in the 1970s, his look is changed dramatically to resemble Sellers, and then Steve Martin in the 2006 reboot of the series.

The theme music heard during the titles of the cartoon was the instrumental "A Shot in the Dark" by Henry Mancini, from the 1964 feature film of the same name (the second entry in the Pink Panther live-action film series). Additional music in the cartoons was composed initially by William Lava, then Walter Greene. Two shorts had their own unique arrangement of the theme music during the opening sequence, Napoleon Blown-Aparte and Cock-A-Doodle Deux Deux.

17 entries made their television debut during the inaugural season (1969–1970) of The Pink Panther Show, featuring shorter opening titles (minus credits). The remaining 17 entries appeared during the show's second season with complete theatrical opening titles.

== List of shorts ==
=== 1965 ===
#	Title	Date	Director	Story	Synopsis	Notes
01	The Great De Gaulle Stone Operation	December 21, 1965	Friz Freleng; Gerry Chiniquy(co-director	John W. Dunn	The Inspector is assigned to guard a valuable diamond known as the De Gaulle Stone, but must retrieve it when he inadvertently lets it get stolen by the three-headed jewel thief, the Matzoriley Brothers: Weft (voiced by Paul Frees), Wight (voiced by Pat Harrington, Jr.), and Wong (also voiced by Frees).	This is the first cartoon in the Inspector series. This cartoon was originally released in theaters with the fourth James Bond film Thunderball during its original theatrical run.

=== 1966 ===
#	Title	Date	Director	Story	Synopsis	Notes
02	Reaux, Reaux, Reaux Your Boat	February 1, 1966	Gerry Chiniquy	John W. Dunn	The Inspector is after the notorious smuggler Captain Clamity and his first mate Crab Louie (both voiced by Paul Frees). In their various attempts to board Clamity's ship, the pair's rowboats are broken in two by the criminals in various ways, causing the Inspector's portion of the boat to sink into the ocean along with him, while Deux-Deux's half stays afloat.	The Commissioner does not appear.
03	Napoleon Blown-Aparte	February 2, 1966	Gerry Chiniquy	John W. Dunn	The Mad Bomber (laughter provided by Larry Storch) escapes from Le Prison and swears vengeance on the Commissioner for imprisoning him there. The Commissioner assigns the Inspector to protect him, but the Inspector's incompetence results in him continually failing to prevent his boss from being blown up with an endless number of bombs at the Mad Bomber's disposal.	An alternative rendition of The Inspector theme, "A Shot in the Dark", is featured during the credits. Final cartoon to feature Larry Storch as the voice of the Commissioner.
04	Cirrhosis of the Louvre	March 9, 1966	Gerry Chiniquy	John W. Dunn	The insidious criminal known as the Blotch plans to steal all the paintings from the Louvre and the Inspector and Deux-Deux arrive in an attempt to foil his plot.	First cartoon to feature Paul Frees as the voice of the Commissioner.
05	Plastered in Paris	April 5, 1966	Gerry Chiniquy	John W. Dunn	The Inspector and Deux-Deux are assigned to chase a supposed fugitive known as "X" across the globe.	
06	Cock-A-Doodle Deux Deux	June 15, 1966	Robert McKimson	Michael O'Connor	The largest diamond in the world, the Plymouth Rock, has been stolen from Madame Marquise de Poule Bon (voiced by Helen Gerald) at her chateau and the Inspector is assigned to solve the case. After finding that Madame de Poule Bon was a chicken plucker in her past, he investigates the chateau, only to find out that Madame's servants are all chickens and he must deduce which one could have pulled off the theft.	An alternative rendition of The Inspector theme "A Shot in the Dark" is featured during the credits. Final cartoon to be fully scored by William Lava.
07	Ape Suzette	June 24, 1966	Gerry Chiniquy	John W. Dunn	While training Sergeant Deux-Deux in self-defense, the Inspector gets a phone call from the Commissioner, who assigns them both to investigate the theft of a shipment of bananas. The Inspector interrogates a diminutive sailor (voiced by Paul Frees) who pleads innocence, but when the Inspector attempts to fight him, the scrawny sailor's gorilla accomplice Judy gets in all the punches.	First cartoon to be scored by Walter Greene. The Commissioner does not appear.
08	The Pique Poquette of Paris	August 25, 1966	George Singer	John W. Dunn	The Inspector and Sergeant Deux-Deux attempt to apprehend the notorious multi-armed pickpocket Spider Pierre (voiced by Paul Frees).	The Commissioner does not appear.
09	Sicque! Sicque! Sicque!	September 23, 1966	George Singer	John W. Dunn	After the Sûreté apprehend a mad scientist in Rue Morgue, who is carted off to an insane asylum, the Inspector and Sergeant Deux-Deux are assigned to inspect the scientist's mansion. Deux-Deux clumsily drinks a swig of a strange potion, and, from then on, transforms at infrequent intervals into a Mr. Hyde-type monster who, in routines, torments and attacks the Inspector (who has no idea that the creature is actually Deux-Deux) upon every transformation.	The Commissioner does not appear.
10	That's No Lady — That's Notre Dame!	October 26, 1966	George Singer	John W. Dunn	The Inspector is assigned to apprehend a particular purse snatcher who is operating in the Hotel D'Hote - where the Commissioner lives. He sets up a sting operation by disguising himself as a woman, but catches the eye of the Commissioner, who thinks the Inspector is a woman, and attempts to have an affair with him, with the Inspector soon falling afoul of the Commissioner's jealous wife (voiced by Diana Maddox).	
11	Unsafe and Seine	November 9, 1966	George Singer	John W. Dunn	The Inspector and Deux-Deux travel across the world on an undercover search for an agent, getting into all sorts of accidents along the way.	
12	Toulouse La Trick	December 30, 1966	Robert McKimson	John W. Dunn	After notorious desperado Toulouse le Moose jumps bail, he escapes to Cherbourg, where he is apprehended, and the Inspector is tasked with returning him to Paris; he handcuffs himself to Toulouse to prevent him from escaping and disposes of the keys, which causes problems on the way to the station.	Sgt. Deux-Deux and the Commissioner do not appear.

=== 1967 ===
#	Title	Date	Director	Story	Synopsis	Notes
13	Sacré Bleu Cross	February 1, 1967	Gerry Chiniquy	John W. Dunn	When the Inspector and Deux-Deux go after the trigger-happy criminal Hassan the Assassin (voiced by Paul Frees), Deux-Deux gives the Inspector a rabbit's foot that he claims will bring good luck to him (given that it happens to be Friday the 13th), but unfortunately for the Inspector, it does the exact opposite.	The Commissioner does not appear.
14	Le Quiet Squad	May 17, 1967	Robert McKimson	Jim Ryan	The Commissioner is overworked and needs absolute quiet, or he goes into uncontrolled fits of temper. The Inspector is assigned to look after him, but has trouble with a noisy cat that poses a threat to the Commissioner's calmness.	Sgt. Deux-Deux does not appear.
15	Bomb Voyage	May 22, 1967	Robert McKimson	Tony Benedict	The Commissioner is kidnapped by extraterrestrials, and so the Inspector and Deux-Deux travel to their planet to rescue him.	
16	Le Pig-Al Patrol	May 24, 1967	Gerry Chiniquy	Jim Ryan	The Inspector is sent to apprehend a biker gang led by the notorious Pig-Al (voiced by Marvin Miller) for the crime of disturbing the peace.	Sgt. Deux-Deux does not appear.
17	Le Bowser Bagger	May 30, 1967	Gerry Chiniquy	Jim Ryan	The Inspector is partnered with Private Bowser, a very energetic police dog, in his efforts to track down a thief.	First cartoon to feature Marvin Miller as the voice of the Commissioner. Sgt. Deux-Deux does not appear.
18	Le Escape Goat	June 29, 1967	Gerry Chiniquy	Jim Ryan	After being suspended for letting notorious criminal Louie le Finke (voiced by Pat Harrington, Jr.) escape, the Inspector tries to stop Louie from carrying out his threats of taking vengeance on the Commissioner, but ends up becoming part of the manhunt himself when, due to a series of misunderstandings, the Commissioner thinks the Inspector is trying to exact revenge on him for being suspended.	Final cartoon to feature Paul Frees as the voice of the Commissioner. Sgt. Deux-Deux does not appear.
19	Le Cop on Le Rocks	July 3, 1967	George Singer	Jim Ryan	The Inspector is sent to prison, having been mistaken for a bank robber who looks exactly like him. His constant attempts to escape add even more years to his sentence.	Sgt. Deux-Deux and the Commissioner do not appear.
20	Crow De Guerre	August 16, 1967	Gerry Chiniquy	John W. Dunn	Summoned to the Chateau Splendid to find a jewel thief, the Inspector finds that the perpetrator is actually a thieving crow, who continually outwits him at every turn.	Sgt. Deux-Deux and the Commissioner do not appear.
21	Canadian Can-Can	September 20, 1967	Gerry Chiniquy	John W. Dunn	Sent to Canada on an exchange program, the Inspector is assigned to catch Two-Faced Harry, who has a well-mannered, innocent face (voiced by Pat Harrington, Jr.) on one side of his head and an evil, vicious face (voiced by Mark Skor) on the other side.	Only cartoon to feature Mark Skor as the voice of the Commissioner. Sgt. Deux-Deux does not appear.
22	Tour de Farce	October 25, 1967	Gerry Chiniquy	Jim Ryan	The Inspector is assigned to drop off burly convict Mack le Truck (voiced by Marvin Miller) at the Devil's Island prison, but through his own mistake, they both end up stranded on a deserted island. Mack attempts to kill him in retaliation, leaving the Inspector to fight for his life.	Sgt. Deux-Deux and the Commissioner do not appear.
23	The Shooting of Caribou Lou	December 20, 1967	Gerry Chiniquy	John W. Dunn	On holiday in Canada as a Mountie, the Inspector is kidnapped by the diminutive, yet aggressive fur trapper, Caribou Lou (voiced by Mark Skor), who holds him hostage.	Sgt. Deux-Deux and the Commissioner do not appear.

=== 1968 ===
#	Title	Date	Director	Story	Synopsis	Notes
24	London Derriere	February 7, 1968	Gerry Chiniquy	Jim Ryan	Having chased international jewel thief Louie le Swipe around Europe, the Inspector tries to nab him in London. Unfortunately, he runs afoul of the no-gun laws that the U.K.'s police must abide by. He works alongside a British police captain from Scotland Yard (voiced by Lennie Weinrib) in order to bring Louie to justice.	The first two scenes of this short feature music reused from The Great De Gaulle Stone Operation. Sgt. Deux-Deux and the Commissioner do not appear.
25	Les Miserobots	March 21, 1968	Gerry Chiniquy	Jim Ryan	The Inspector is fired after being replaced by an efficient police robot. He constantly tries to destroy it with the hope of getting his job back, but all attempts prove fruitless; ultimately, the Commissioner himself is fired and replaced by the same robot.	This title is pun on the phrase "Les Miserables", Sgt. Deux-Deux does not appear.
26	Transylvania Mania	March 26, 1968	Gerry Chiniquy	John W. Dunn	The Inspector is sent to find a scientist in Transylvania who is making monsters without a license. The scientist is a vampire (voiced by Hal Smith), who needs a brain for his latest monster, and the Inspector arrives at just the right moment; as such, he and his dimwitted, brawny accomplice, Urg (voiced by Marvin Miller) go after him.	Sgt. Deux-Deux and the Commissioner do not appear.
27	Bear De Guerre	April 26, 1968	Gerry Chiniquy	Jim Ryan	The Inspector goes quail hunting in a forest - illegally, at that - but runs afoul of a short-tempered brown bear (voiced by Marvin Miller) who thinks he is being hunted.	Sgt. Deux-Deux and the Commissioner do not appear.
28	Cherche Le Phantom	June 13, 1968	Gerry Chiniquy	Tony Benedict	Given the choice of assignment to either find a gorilla that has escaped from the Paris Zoo or to catch a phantom hiding in the Paris opera house, the Inspector chooses to go after the phantom.	
29	Le Great Dane Robbery	July 7, 1968	Gerry Chiniquy	Jim Ryan	The Inspector must get past a vicious guard dog named Tiny in order to retrieve a code cipher stolen from a French intelligence unit. Moreover, the Inspector is not happy that this assignment came right before his scheduled vacation on a sea cruise and, as a result, pours on the effort so as not to miss the boat.	Sgt. Deux-Deux does not appear.
30	Le Ball and Chain Gang	July 24, 1968	Gerry Chiniquy	Jim Ryan	The Inspector tries to get into the house of an argumentative couple named Charlie and Edna (voiced by Hal Smith and June Foray, respectively), who think they are about to be arrested, when all the Inspector was trying to do was to notify Charlie that he is to serve jury duty.	Sgt. Deux-Deux and the Commissioner do not appear.
31	La Feet's Defeat	July 24, 1968	Gerry Chiniquy	Jim Ryan	The Commissioner assigns the Inspector and Deux-Deux to capture Muddy la Feet. They encounter many booby traps along the way, which Deux-Deux sets off.	Sgt. Deux-Deux and the Commissioner's final appearances. Sgt. Deux-Deux appears as a much younger and more naive version than in other shorts and is voiced by Don Messick instead of Pat Harrington, Jr.

=== 1969 ===
#	Title	Date	Director	Story	Synopsis	Notes
32	French Freud	January 22, 1969	Gerry Chiniquy	Jack Miller	A crooked Russian actress, Melody Mercurochrome (voiced by June Foray) and her "maid" — her husband in drag (voiced by Marvin Miller; voiced in his disguise by Foray), who is also a psychiatrist — are trying to snatch the Du Barry diamond, which the Inspector is guarding.	Sgt. Deux-Deux and the Commissioner do not appear.
33	Pierre and Cottage Cheese	February 26, 1969	Gerry Chiniquy		The Inspector is assigned to meet a Chinese special agent outside an abandoned house, who will help him capture criminal Dirty Pierre le Punk (voiced by Marvin Miller) who is allegedly hiding out in the house. The agent is a Chinese robot by the name of Charlie (voiced by Pat Harrington, Jr.), who gives the Inspector ideas to catch Pierre, which always fail miserably. It is later revealed that the robot is actually Pierre in disguise, and when the real Chinese agent (also voiced by Harrington) arrives to meet the Inspector, he is chased into the horizon by a furious Inspector.	The Chinese agent appears to be a parody of Charlie Chan. Sgt. Deux-Deux and the Commissioner do not appear.
34	Carte Blanched	May 14, 1969	Gerry Chiniquy	David Detiege	The Inspector ends up on the run from the law when a malignant voiceover (voiced by Marvin Miller) convinces him that he has accidentally stolen a shopping cart from his local supermarket.	Sgt. Deux-Deux and the Commissioner do not appear. Final cartoon of the series.

== Cast ==
- Pat Harrington Jr. – The Inspector, Sergeant Deux-Deux (except for La Feet’s Defeat - in this entry, Sergeant Deux-Deux is portrayed by Don Messick)
- Paul Frees – The Commissioner (1966–1967)
- Larry Storch – The Commissioner (1965–1966) (The Great DeGaulle Stone Operation, Napoleon Blown-Aparte)
- Marvin Miller – The Commissioner (1967, 1968–1969), The Inspector and Sgt Deux-Deux (The Pink Panther Show)
- Mark Skor – The Commissioner (1967) (Canadian Can-Can)

== Home video ==
A DVD containing the first 17 shorts was released on March 4, 2008, from MGM Home Entertainment/20th Century Fox Home Entertainment.

A DVD set titled Pink Panther and Friends Classic Cartoon Collection released on January 27, 2009, by MGM contains the previously released set of the first 17 shorts and a second set of the last 17 shorts.

The first season of The Pink Panther is available for viewing on Amazon Video in the United States.

On April 26, 2016, Kino Lorber released The Inspector: The DePatie-Freleng Collection on DVD and Blu-ray - this 2-disc DVD and Blu-ray release set collects the 34 (17 for each disc) classic shorts, along with retrospective featurettes focusing on DePatie-Freleng Enterprises.

== Revival ==
The title character of The Inspector was revived in 1993 for the syndicated series, The Pink Panther, voiced by Brian George. The Inspector often works alongside the Pink Panther when he is depicted in law enforcement. He also appears in the intro and outro to the game The Pink Panther: Passport to Peril, voiced by Barry Carrollo, as the head of a secret agency for which Pink works.

== In other media ==
A back-up feature starring the Inspector appeared regularly in The Pink Panther and the Inspector comic books published by Gold Key comics, and he starred in his own title. He appears in the computer game The Pink Panther: Passport to Peril, where he hires the Pink Panther to help him fight crime. The Inspector and Deux-Deux also appear in the 1981 story record A Pink Panther Christmas from Kid Stuff Records, in which they try to capture The Pink Panther while he is helping Santa Claus.
