= Castle of Otranto (film) =

- Czech title card
- Directed by: Jan Švankmajer
- Written by: Jan Svankmajer
- Produced by: Marta Sichova, Thomas Formacek (uncredited), Vera Henzlova (uncredited)
- Starring: Jaroslav Vozáb, Miroslav Frýba, Karel Chocholin, Xenie Vavreckova (animator)
- Cinematography: Jiri Safar
- Edited by: Helena Lebduskova
- Music by: Zdeněk Liška
- Production company: Jiri Trnka Studio
- Distributed by: Krátký Film Praha; Ustredni Pujcovna Filmu
- Release date: 1977
- Running time: 15 minutes
- Country: Czechoslovakia
- Language: Czech

Castle of Otranto (Czech: Otrantský zámek) is a 1977 Czechoslovak animated short film by Jan Švankmajer. It is based on Horace Walpole's 1764 novel The Castle of Otranto. The film takes the form of a pseudo-documentary live-action story, with an abridged adaptation of the story itself presented in cut-out animation in the style of Gothic art.

== Plot ==
Jaroslav Vozáb decides to find a place where the story of the novel The Castle of Otranto took place, as he believes it is based on a true story. He finds similarities between the ruins of Czech Castle Otrhany and the castle in the novel, which leads him to believe that Otrhany is the castle he is seeking. A television reporter, Miroslav Frýba, interviews Vozáb, who tells him about his research and the story of the book.

The film also features a storyline from the book told through animation done by Xenie Vavreckova. It starts with Conrad, the son of Lord Manfred, being crushed by a giant helmet on his way to his wedding with Isabela. Manfred is devastated by the fact that he has lost his only heir and decides to marry Isabela himself, which horrifies her and she runs away. Manfred pursues her but is stopped by a giant knight and Isabela is then saved by Theodore. Manfred then imprisons Theodore, while Isabela hides.

A knight from another kingdom comes to Otranto Castle wanting to deliver Isabela. Theodore in the meantime is freed by Manfred's daughter Matilda, who loves Theodore and is saddened by the fact that he loves Isabela. Theodore then goes to find Isabela, who hides in a mountain cave. Theodore meets the knight there and they fight for Isabela. Theodore eventually wins the fight but the knight is revealed to be Isabela's father Frederic.

Frederic is healed in Otranto Castle, while Theodore hides in a forest. Manfred makes a deal with Frederic that they both will marry each other's daughter. Frederic then goes to propose to Matilda but is stopped by the giant knight and realises his mistake. He decides not to marry Matilda and not to give his daughter to Manfred. Angered, Manfred decides to kill Isabela but accidentally kills his own daughter. The Giant Knight then ruins the castle and kills Manfred in the process. Theodore and Isabela are then seen happily together.

When Vozáb finishes his talk Frýba begins to question the possibility of supernatural elements being part of the story but suddenly grit and pieces of stone start to fall from the castle and the giant knight's hand (Karel Chocholin) is seen on the top of a tower as the film ends.
