= The Garden (1968 film) =

- Directed by: Jan Švankmajer
- Written by: Jan Švankmajer; Ivan Kraus
- Based on: Living Fence by Ivan Kraus
- Produced by: Josef Soukup
- Starring: Jiří Hálek; Luděk Kopřiva
- Cinematography: Svatopluk Malý
- Edited by: Milada Sádková
- Music by: Zdeněk Liška
- Production company: Krátký Film Praha
- Release date: August 1968
- Running time: 17 minutes
- Country: Czechoslovakia
- Language: Czech

The Garden (Czech: Zahrada) is a 1968 short Czechoslovak film directed by Jan Švankmajer. It was written by Švankmajer and Ivan Kraus based on Kraus's story Living Fence.

== Plot ==
Josef invites his old friend Franta to his home. Franta is shocked when he finds out that the house is surrounded by people who are holding their hands. Josef shows Franta his garden but Franta eventually asks who the people are. Josef tells him it is his hedge (lit. "living fence" in Czech) and that the people in the fence are volunteers that Josef has some knowledge about. Franta eventually finds his place in the fence.

== Cast ==
- Jiří Hálek as Franta
- Luděk Kopřiva as Josef
- Míla Myslíková as Miluš
- Václav Borovička as Borůvka
- František Husák as man in rubber coat
