= Gormenghast (opera) =

1998 opera composed by Irmin Schmidt

- Opera by Irmin Schmidt
- Librettist: Duncan Fallowell
- Language: English
- Based on: Mervyn Peake's Gormenghast Trilogy
- Premiere: 15 November 1998; Opernhaus Wuppertal

Gormenghast is an opera in three acts composed by Irmin Schmidt to an English-language libretto by Duncan Fallowell, based on Mervyn Peake's Gormenghast Trilogy. It premiered at the Opernhaus Wuppertal on 15 November 1998.

== Background ==
Mervyn Peake's Gormenghast Trilogy, on which the opera is based, is a Gothic tale recounting the rise of the evil Steerpike from a kitchen boy in Gormenghast castle to total domination of the castle and its aristocratic inhabitants. Benjamin Britten had contemplated composing an opera based on the trilogy in the 1950s, but then changed his mind. Irmin Schmidt and his librettist Duncan Fallowell, the first to base on opera on the work, began working on it in the early 1990s after receiving a commission from the Wuppertaler Bühnen. Schmidt had studied composition with Karlheinz Stockhausen and György Ligeti in the 1950s. As an avant-garde rock musician, he founded the rock band Can in 1968 and performed with them as its keyboardist for ten years. Fallowell, who had written the lyrics to two of Schmidt's albums, Musk at Dusk (1987) and Impossible Holidays (1991), wrote the first draft of the libretto while he was living in Saint Petersburg.

Schmidt calls Gormenghast a "fantasy opera"', saying that "Gormenghast is, both in spirit and form, grand opera. But elements and characteristics of musical, the rock concert, and modern dance theatre play equally important roles within it". At a meeting of the UK's Mervyn Peake Society in 1995, Schmidt played three excerpts from the opera-in-progress, recorded on audio cassette—the music for the castle kitchen scene, a duet sung by the twins Cora and Clarice, and Steerpike's drunken song as he climbs to the top of the castle. The music for the castle kitchen had been recorded in his own kitchen using saucepans, plates, spoons, and forks as the percussion. At the meeting he said that writing Gormenghast had been a revelation for him; "I'm no longer an avant-garde artist, out to shock. I want people to enjoy my music."

== Performance history ==
Schmidt was present during weeks of rehearsals before the premiere and re-wrote parts for specific voices. The opera premiered at the Opernhaus Wuppertal on 15 November 1998, sung in English. The stage director was Michael Sturminger, Simon Rekers conducted the Wuppertal Sinfonieorchester. Renate Martin and Andreas Donhauser designed stage and costumes. A performance takes about three hours with singers and a string quartet performing live. The rest of the music, including full orchestra and performances from Can members Jaki Liebezeit and Michael Karoli, is pre-recorded, mixed and produced for multi-channel playback by Prof. Jono Podmore. The opera has three tenor roles—one scored for the operatic tenor voice (Swelter), and two for rock singers (Barquentine and Steerpike).

The Wuppertal production transferred to the Musiktheater im Revier in Gelsenkirchen in February 1999. Highlights from the opera were recorded that same year and released in 2000 by Spoon Records, with the composer conducting the Brandenburger Symphoniker. Gormenghast was revived with a new production directed by Andreas Baesler in June 2004 when it was staged at the Völklingen Ironworks, an industrial UNESCO World Heritage Site. Later that month the production transferred to the Grand Théâtre de Luxembourg. The piece had its Austrian premiere in October 2025 at the Linz State Theatre.

== Roles ==
Roles, voice types, premiere cast
Role	Voice type	Premiere cast, 15 November 1998 Conductor: Simon Rekers
Titus Groan, heir to the Earldom of Gormenghast	(mimed role)	Jakob Fedler / Thomas Hartung
Lord Sepulchrave, Titus Groan's father	lyric baritone	Mark Morouse
Lady Gertrude, Titus Groan's mother	mezzo-soprano	Danielle Grima
Cora, Lord Sepulchrave's sister	coloratura soprano	Elise Kaufman
Clarice, identical twin of Cora	coloratura soprano	Sabine Schnitzer
Swelter, Lord Sepulchrave's chef	lyric tenor	Markus Heinrich / Florian Simson
Barquentine, Master of Rituals at Gormenghast Castle	tenor (rock singer)	Ulrich Wewelsiep
Dr. Prunesquallor, the court physician	countertenor	Reiner Beinghaus
Fuchsia, the elder sister of Titus Groan	soprano	Claudia Visca
Flay, Lord Sepulchrave's manservant	(speaking role)	Markus Dietz
Steerpike, an ambitious former kitchen-boy and Machiavellian schemer	tenor (rock singer)	Stefan Vinzberg
Nanny Slagg, Fuchsia's elderly companion and the former nurse of both Fuchsia and Titus	(speaking role)	Walter Theil

== Reception ==
According to Spoon Records, Rodney Milnes wrote in a review that appeared in The Times on 24 November 1998, "the sheer range of "sensurround" sound is bewildering, loud, sensuous, always intriguing, especially the rustles of exotic percussion emerging from around the auditorium. If Richard Strauss had written rock music, this is what it would have sounded like – gloriously, unashamedly lush." Douglas Wolk, in a review of the 1999 recording for the CMJ New Music Monthly, wrote that Schmidt "occasionally covers up the frailness of his melodies with superfluous beat-jockeying" but found that the opera's best pieces were "convincing both as drama and as compositions." In his review of the 2004 revival, Dieter Lintz described Schmidt's score, especially for the singers, as predominantly tonal and "quite ear-friendly" with elements of Baroque music, Benjamin Britten, and Andrew Lloyd Webber. He also noted how overwhelming sound waves combined with "a rich, driving, yet finely differentiated beat" often washed over the auditorium and concluded that the work was such an unusual combination of elements that it constituted a new and unique musical art form.
