= Gormenghast (TV serial) =

TV series based on the book by Mervyn Peake

- DVD cover
- Created by: Series: Malcolm McKay; Books: Mervyn Peake
- Written by: Malcolm McKay
- Directed by: Andy Wilson, Estelle Daniel (producer)
- Starring: Jonathan Rhys Meyers; Celia Imrie; Ian Richardson; Neve McIntosh; Christopher Lee; Richard Griffiths
- Music by: Richard Rodney Bennett John Tavener
- Country of origin: United Kingdom
- Original language: English
- No. of series: 1
- No. of episodes: 4

Production
- Editor: Paul Tothill
- Running time: approx. 58 min. (per episode)
- Production company: WGBH Boston Productions for BBC Television

Original release
- Network: BBC Two
- Release: 17 January – 7 February 2000

Gormenghast is a four-episode television series based on the first two novels of the Gothic fantasy Gormenghast series by Mervyn Peake. It was produced and broadcast by the BBC.

First broadcast in the UK in January 2000, the series was designed for an early evening time-slot in much the same vein as the earlier adaptations of The Chronicles of Narnia. The BBC conception was based on the idea that Peake's early life in China had influenced the creation of Gormenghast; thus, the castle in the series resembles the Forbidden City in Beijing as well as the holy city of Lhasa in Tibet. The series received widespread press attention in the UK, but initially impressive viewing numbers dropped 40% after two weeks.

== Plot ==
The series covers the events of the first two books, Titus Groan and Gormenghast. It does not cover any of the events from the third book, Titus Alone.

Episode	Summary
Episode 1	Depicts the events of the first half of Titus Groan, beginning with the birth of Titus and features a number of events including Titus's christening, Steerpike's escape and the events up to the lighting of the fire in the Library.
Episode 2	The episode begins by detailing the conclusion of the events surrounding the fire in the Library. This episode mainly focuses on the events in the second half of Titus Groan, including Sepulchrave's descent into madness and the subsequent death of the Earl and Swelter, Keda's departure and the birth of The Thing, and the banishment of Flay. It ends with the ceremony in which Titus is invested as Earl.
Episode 3	The episode picks up the story eleven years after the events of the previous episode and mainly covers the events from the early part of Gormenghast. Titus, now aged 12, is a schoolboy. The episode includes events such as Irma Prunesquallor's party and her romance with Professor Bellgrove, the murder of Nannie Slagg by Steerpike, and the incarceration of Clarice and Cora. During the episode, Titus begins to rebel and makes his first journey away from the castle, where he meets Flay and sees The Thing.
Episode 4	The final episode covers the remaining events of Gormenghast, in which Titus – now aged 17 –, along with Flay and the Doctor, discover Steerpike's misdeeds. Events in this episode include Steerpike's murder of Barquentine, the discovery of the twins' corpses, Fuchsia's depression, the flood, the search for Steerpike and Titus's wish to leave Gormenghast.

== Cast ==
Role	Actor
Steerpike	Jonathan Rhys Meyers
Gertrude, Countess of Groan	Celia Imrie
Sepulchrave, Earl of Groan	Ian Richardson
Lady Fuchsia Groan	Neve McIntosh
Flay, personal servant to Lord Sepulchrave	Christopher Lee
Swelter, Head Chef of Gormenghast	Richard Griffiths
Barquentine, Master of Ritual	Warren Mitchell
Titus, Earl of Groan (17 years)	Andrew N. Robertson
Titus, Earl of Groan (12 years)	Cameron Powrie
Dr Alfred Prunesquallor	John Sessions
Irma Prunesquallor	Fiona Shaw
Nannie Slagg	June Brown
Keda	Olga Sosnovska
Lady Clarice Groan	Zoë Wanamaker
Lady Cora Groan	Lynsey Baxter
Professor Bellgrove	Stephen Fry
Rottcodd	Windsor Davies
Mollocks	Eric Sykes
Headmaster De'Ath	Spike Milligan
The Fly	Gregor Fisher
Professor Perch	Mark Williams
Professor Flower	Martin Clunes
Professor Mule	Steve Pemberton
Professor Shred	Phil Cornwell
Professor Fluke	James Dreyfus
Poet	Sean Hughes

== Production ==
At the time of its broadcast, led by producer, Estelle Daniel, Gormenghast was among the most ambitious serials ever undertaken by the BBC. The series required a combined five years of production and pre-production and utilized over 120 sets.

== Differences from source material ==
Changes were made to both the plots and characters of both books.

=== Plot ===
Certain changes are made to make the story fit the four-episode format:

- Steerpike's murder of Barquentine is delayed until the fourth episode, to make room for the sections concerning Titus's escapes, thus making the character significantly older when this happens.
- The story of Keda's lovers' rivalry and Keda's subsequent wanderings in the wilderness are condensed and she leaves Gormenghast much later, just prior to Swelter and Sepulchrave's deaths.
- Steerpike's backstory was amended for the TV series. In Titus Groan he had only been in the kitchen for a few weeks before making his escape, while on TV in a monologue to his monkey in episode 4, Steerpike stated that he was sent to the kitchens when he was six, suffering various abuses at the hands of Swelter. In the DVD documentary The Making of Gormenghast Jonathan Rhys-Myers (who played Steerpike) stated that the character of Steerpike had been subjected to sexual abuse in the kitchens, though this was not made explicit in any of the episodes.
- A section of the plot of Titus Groan in which Fuchsia and Steerpike meet in the woods and discuss equality, and Fuchsia subsequently breaking her leg, are moved forward into the events of Gormenghast, by which point Steerpike is actively trying to seduce Fuchsia.
- In the books, Fuchsia falls out of love instantly with Steerpike when he calls her a fool, but in the series her love endures after he is unmasked. In episode 4, an additional scene is added where Steerpike, now on the run, begs for Fuchsia's help and seems to be on the point of receiving it, but when he calls her "Fuchsia", rather than Lady as he has on all other occasions, the lack of deference shocks Fuchsia who calls for the guards. Steerpike leaps from the window, claiming that he could have given her everything.
- Fuchsia commits suicide deliberately by dropping from the same window, whereas in the book this is an accident occasioned by her striking her head when a visitor surprises her.
- In the books, it is ambiguous whether Nannie Slagg's death is natural from old age or not. In the series, it is clear that Steerpike poisons Nannie Slagg, who has become an obstacle to Steerpike's relationship with Fuchsia.

=== Characters ===
- In the book, Steerpike is described as being less physically attractive, with close-set red eyes and greasy hair, which he does not have in the series.
- Several minor characters were cut out entirely for the screen, most notably Sourdust (Barquentine's father who dies in the fire), Pentecost (the gardener) and some of the professors.
- The Headmaster's name has been changed from Deadyawn to De'Ath.
- The character named Rottcodd, who in the book was in charge of the Hall of the Bright Carvings, becomes in the miniseries captain of the guard; a similar character does appear in the books but goes unnamed.
- The names of some other Professors have been shortened. Professor Mulefire is renamed Professor Mule, Professor Cutflower is renamed Professor Flower.
- Barquentine has two legs and crutches on screen rather than one as in the book because Warren Mitchell was unable to manage with one leg strapped up.

== Reception ==
The series received critical acclaim in some quarters, with particular praise for its visual design, music, cinematography and the cast's performances. Variety offered an especially glowing review, describing it as an "unforgettable production" and a fascinating drama that defied logic. And specifically, the review noted that it featured "marvelous performances all around", although it singled out Celia Imrie's portrayal of Lady Gertrude for especial praise. The New York Times, on the other hand, referred to "viewers' and critics' lukewarm, disappointed response to the series" and while praising "vivid set pieces and characters" judged that it "lacks the narrative pull that would engage viewers with its stylized world". The Guardian also referred to "harsh verdicts from the critics". Their own reviewer, Nancy Banks-Smith, described it as "quite different from anything else on TV" and praised the "shimmering sets" and "extraordinary costumes".

== Accolades ==
Wins

- The New York Festivals, 2000
  - Silver WorldMedal in Television/Mini-Series
  - Bronze WorldMedal in Television/Best Costume Design
- British Academy of Film and Television Arts/ BAFTA, 2000
  - Best Make-up/Hair Design - Joan Hills, Christine Greenwood
  - Best Visual Effects and Graphic Design - Team
- Royal Television Society Craft & Design Awards 1999/2000
  - Production Design: Drama
    - Christopher Hobbs - Gormenghast
  - Lighting, Photography + Camera: Photography Drama
    - Gavin Finney - Gormenghast
- The Ivor Novello Awards, 2000
  - Best Original Music for a Television/Radio Broadcast
    - Gormenghast, Composed by: Sir Richard Rodney Bennett
  - UK Publisher: Novello & Company

Nominations

- British Academy of Film and Television Arts/ BAFTA, 2000
  - Best Costume Design - Odile Dicks-Mireaux
  - Best Editing Fiction/Entertainment - Paul Tothill
  - Best Original Television Music - Richard Rodney Bennett
  - Best Production Design - Christopher Hobbs
- Royal Television Society Craft & Design Awards 1999/2000
  - Costume Design: Drama
    - Odile Dicks-Mireaux - Gormenghast
- IBC (International Broadcasting Convention) Le Nombre d'Or, Amsterdam, 2000
  - Gormenghast
- Banff Television Festival/Banff Rockie Award, 2001
  - Gormenghast
