= Brian Sibley =

English writer (born 1949)

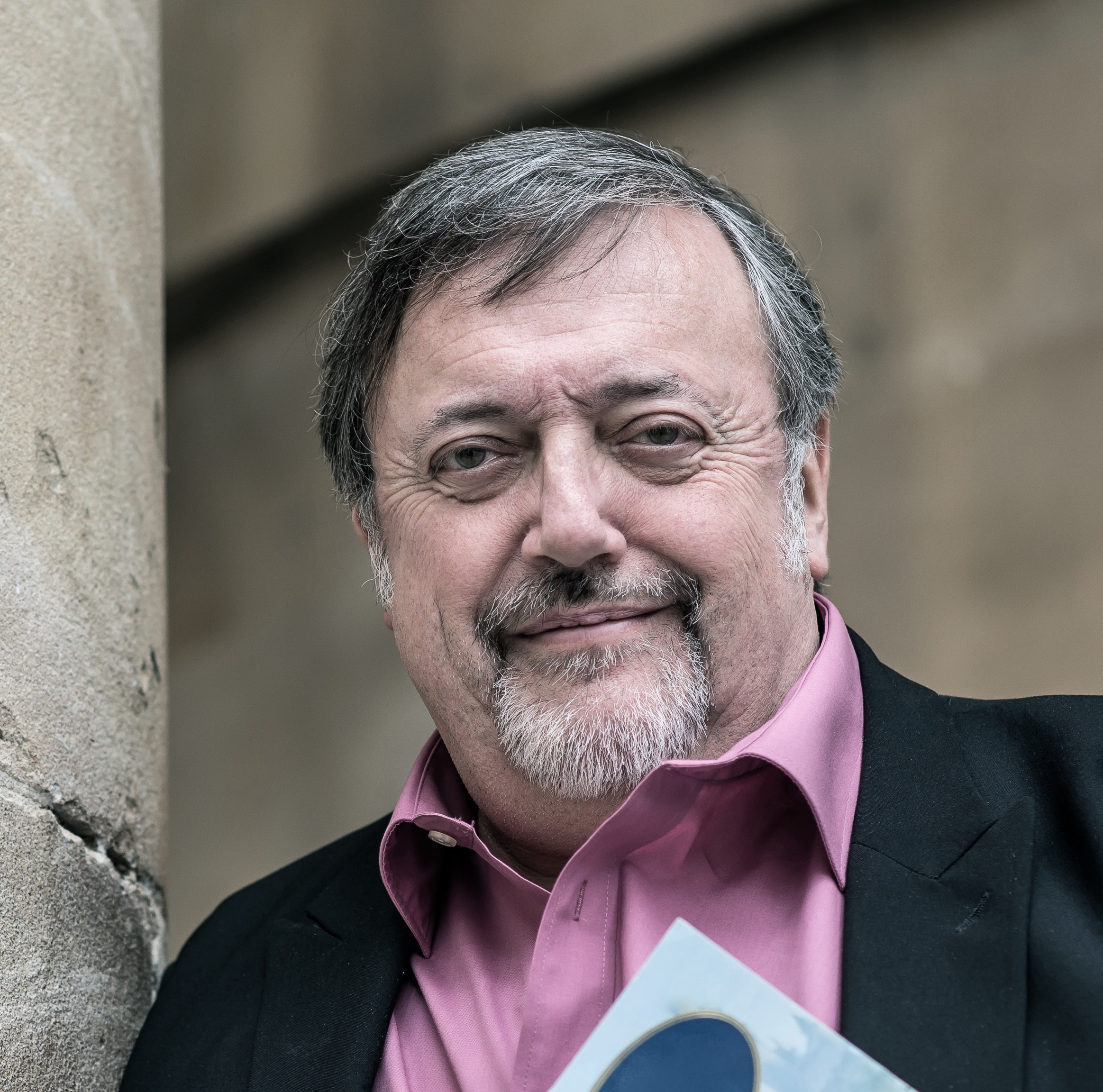
- Sibley in 2014
- Born: Brian David Sibley; 14 July 1949 (age 77); Wandsworth, London, England
- Education: Chislehurst Secondary School for Boys
- Occupations: Writer and broadcaster
- Spouse: David Weeks
- Relatives: Frank Sibley (uncle)
- Writing career
- Period: 1974–present
- Notable work: BBC Radio adaptation of The Lord of the Rings
- Notable awards: Sony Radio Award (1985)
- Website: www.briansibley.com

Brian David Sibley (born 14 July 1949) is an English writer. He is author of over 100 hours of radio drama and has written and presented hundreds of radio documentaries, features and weekly programmes. Among his adaptations is the 1981 version of The Lord of the Rings for radio. A columnist and author, he is widely known as the author of many film "making of" books, including those for the Harry Potter series, and The Lord of the Rings and The Hobbit trilogies.

== Early life ==
Sibley was born in Wandsworth, London, to Eric George Sibley, an architectural draughtsman, and Doris Alice Sibley (née Summers). His uncle was the philosopher Frank Sibley.

His family moved to Chislehurst, Kent when he was five years old. He was educated at St Nicholas Church of England Primary School and Chislehurst Secondary School for Boys (later renamed Edgebury School for Boys), where he was awarded A-levels in English and Art.

Following the frustration of his varied ambitions to be an actor, a cartoonist and an animator, Sibley worked first in various clerical capacities for the London Borough of Bromley, and then for a shipping and finance company in London as a clerk, office manager and head of department. In his spare time he began submitting scripts to the BBC and, when his company was taken over, he accepted redundancy and became a full-time freelance writer.

== Career ==
Radio writing and broadcasting

Sibley's first programme was Three Cheers for Pooh, broadcast on BBC Radio 4 on 14 October 1976 to mark the 50th anniversary of the publication of A. A. Milne's Winnie-the-Pooh. The programme was presented by actor Peter Bull, featured the voices of Norman Shelley and pianist and singer Antony Miall and was directed by John Tydeman, later Head of BBC Drama.

Other features quickly followed and, in 1981, he co-wrote (with Michael Bakewell) BBC Radio 4's adaptation of Tolkien's The Lord of the Rings He also adapted C. S. Lewis's The Chronicles of Narnia and Mervyn Peake's Titus Groan and Gormenghast for Radio 4, receiving a Sony Radio Award for his Peake plays in 1985. He returned to Peake's writings in 2011 with The History of Titus Groan, a cycle of six one-hour plays for BBC Radio 4's 'Classic Serial' based on Titus Groan, Gormenghast, Titus Alone and Maeve Gilmore's Titus Awakes. Produced by Jeremy Mortimer, the series began transmission on Sunday 10 July with a cast headed by David Warner, Luke Treadaway and Miranda Richardson, and won the BBC Audio Drama Award 2012 for Best Adaptation.

Other major radio dramatizations by Sibley include: John Bunyan's The Pilgrim's Progress; Tolkien's Tales from the Perilous Realm; Roald Dahl's Danny, the Champion of the World; Lucy M. Boston's The Children of Green Knowe, Laurens van der Post's The Night of the New Moon, J. B. Priestley's The Thirty-First of June, Jeffrey Archer's A Matter of Honour, Frank Baker's Miss Hargreaves, James Thurber's The Wonderful O, two series of Ray Bradbury's Tales of the Bizarre, Ray Bradbury's The Illustrated Man and a six-part dramatization of T H White's The Once and Future King starring David Warner as Merlyn. 2016 saw the broadcasting by the BBC of his two-part dramatization of Richard Adams's Watership Down and the J. G. Ballard short story Track 12.

His original radio plays include: ...And Yet Another Partridge in a Pear Tree, starring Penelope Keith, C. S. Lewis: Northern Irishman, and It's Too Late Now.

He was a contributor to and then regular presenter of the former BBC Radio 4 arts programme Kaleidoscope and the BBC World Service arts magazine, Meridian. He also presented the Radio 4 film programme, Talking Pictures, was a regular presenter of The Afternoon Shift and chaired the radio panel games Break A Leg and Screen Test.

He has also contributed to Radio 4's Last Word, Brief Lives, A Good Read, The Radio 2 Arts Show and Radio 3's Night Waves. He also presented several series of the BBC television programme, First Light.

His features and documentaries for Radio 4, Radio 2 and the World Service have included programmes devoted to Sherlock Holmes, Jack the Ripper, Robin Hood, Dracula, Peter Pan, Winnie-the-Pooh, Alice in Wonderland and the life and work of Ambrose Bierce, Robert Raikes, Harry Houdini, Terry Pratchett, George Orwell, Roald Dahl, Ray Bradbury, Richmal Crompton, Fred Zinnemann, Frank Capra, Jim Henson, Paco Pena, James Galway, Marcel Marceau, Bob Hoskins and Julie Andrews.

Key series for BBC Radio 2, made in collaboration with producer Malcolm Prince, include Ain't No Mickey Mouse Business, Disney's Women, David Puttnam's Century of Cinema, Ain't No Mickey Mouse Music, No Place Life Home: A Judy Garland Story, Showman and Starmaker: A Tribute to Bill Cotton and, in Autumn 2010, a series of eight documentaries on aspects of The Musical that he both compiled and wrote. His interviewees for these series included Michael Caine, Richard Attenborough, Angela Lansbury, Margaret O'Brien, Dirk Bogarde, Roy E Disney, Robert Wise, Ken Annakin, Richard Curtis, Richard M Sherman, Leslie Briccusse, Bryan Forbes, Sandy Wilson, Tim Rice, James Rado and Edward Albee. He also wrote and presented a series on the history of film music, The Sound of Movies.

Sibley's book, Shadowlands, was serialized on Radio 2, read by Ian Richardson in what was one of the actor's last pieces of broadcast work.

Gillian Reynolds, then The Daily Telegraph's radio critic, gave him the accolade "magician of the airwaves".

In 1992 Sibley wrote much of the script for Jeff Wayne's Musical Version of Spartacus.

Journalism

Sibley has written as a columnist, reviewer and obituarist for The Times, The Daily Telegraph, The Independent, The Guardian, Times Literary Supplement, The Observer, The Listener, Radio Times, The Church Times and Films and Filming.

Publications

His books include The Disney Studio Story and Mickey Mouse: His Life and Times (with Richard Holliss); The Land of Narnia, illustrated by Pauline Baynes; The Treasury of Narnia (with Alison Sage); Shadowlands: The True Story of C. S. Lewis and Joy Davidman; The Book of Guinness Advertising; a biography of Wilbert Awdry, entitled The Thomas the Tank Engine Man; A Christmas Carol: The Unsung Story; Cracking Animation: The Aardman book of 3-D Film-making, (with Peter Lord); Chicken Run: Hatching the Movie; Three Cheers for Pooh; and The Maps of Tolkien's Middle-earth with artist John Howe.

He is also the author of the children's book, The Frightful Food Feud, and has edited, among other books, The Pooh Sketchbook, The Pooh Book of Quotations and The Wisdom of C. S. Lewis.

The author of The Lord of the Rings: The Making of the Movie Trilogy and other books accompanying The Lord of the Rings, he subsequently wrote the official biography of the films' director, Peter Jackson: A Filmmaker's Journey.

His other books include The Hobbit: The Battle of the Five Armies – The Official Movie Guide, The Hobbit: The Desolation of Smaug – The Official Movie Guide, The Hobbit: An Unexpected Journey – The Official Movie Guide, The Making of The Pirates! In an Adventure with Scientists, Harry Potter Film Wizardry, The Golden Compass: The Official Illustrated Movie Companion, Mary Poppins: Anything Can Happen if You Let It (with Michael Lassell) and a retelling of 50 Favourite Bible Stories selected and read on CD by Cliff Richard and illustrated by Stephen Waterhouse. In October 2016 he was one of four writers contributing new stories about Winnie-the-Pooh for a 90th birthday collection, The Best Bear in All the World. His story introduced a new character, Penguin, inspired by a vintage photograph of A. A. Milne and his young son, Christopher Robin, playing with the original teddy bear who became Winnie-the-Pooh and a plush toy penguin. The same month saw the publication of Taschen Books' The Walt Disney Film Archives. The Animated Movies 1921–1968 to which he contributed five critical essays on Disney films.

His Christmas book, Joseph and the Three Gifts, published in September 2019, was described by Frank Cottrell Boyce as "a little masterpiece". The book was abridged and serialised (by the author) for broadcast in the Christmas week of 2021 on BBC Radio 4, where it was read by Alex Jennings and directed by Martin Jarvis.

In 2021, his fable Osric the Extraordinary Owl, illustrated by his friend Pauline Baynes, was privately published in a limited edition. He is currently editing a book of the letters of Walt Disney.

Sibley recorded DVD audio commentaries for Around the World in 80 Days (1956 film), Animal Farm (1954 film) and Fantasia (1940 film). He has also appeared on the bonus extras to a number of Disney Blu-rays and DVDs, among them Snow White and the Seven Dwarfs, Pinocchio, One Hundred and One Dalmatians, Mary Poppins, The Jungle Book, Sleeping Beauty, Beauty and the Beast, Alice in Wonderland and The Scarecrow of Romney Marsh as well as being included in the documentaries associated with various home media releases of The Lord of the Rings film trilogy.

Sibley is also the editor of The Sunday Times Best-seller, J. R. R. Tolkien's The Fall of Númenor (2022), illustrated by Alan Lee and the winner of the Tolkien Society's 'Best Book of 2023' award.

== Personal life ==
Sibley was the President of The Lewis Carroll Society (2014-2024) when he relinquished the presidency in order to become the Society's Chair. He is an honorary member of The Children's Books History Society, The Magic Circle (of which he was Chair of Council 2012–14 and 2017 to 2020) and the Tolkien Society, from whom he received an Outstanding Contribution Award 2022.

== Bibliography ==
=== Original fiction ===
- After Eights. London Magazine, December 1981 / January 1982.
- The Frightful Food Feud, illustrated by Rosslyn Moran. Lion Hudson, 1994.
- Wow! 366: Speedy Stories in Just 366 Words (as contributor). Scholastic, 2008.
- The Best Bear in All the World, illustrated by Mark Burgess (as contributor). Egmont, 2016.
- Joseph and the Three Gifts: An Angel's Story, illustrated by Henry Martin. Darton, Longman and Todd, 2019.
- Osric the Extraordinary Owl, illustrated by Pauline Baynes. Jay Johnstone, 2021.

=== The Bible ===
- Picture Bible New Testament, illustrated by John Pickering. Scripture Union, 1978 and Anzea Books and Ark Publishing, 1981.
- 50 Favourite Bible Stories; Selected and narrated by Cliff Richard, illustrated by Stephen Waterhouse. Lion Hudson, 2008.
- Favourite Bible Stories, illustrated by Stephen Waterhouse. Lion Hudson, 2021.
- The Empty Tomb: A Story of Easter, illustrated by Stephen Waterhouse. Lion Hudson, 2023.

=== Literature ===
- The Land of Narnia: Brian Sibley Explores the World of C. S. Lewis, illustrated by Pauline Baynes. HarperCollins, 1989.
- A Christmas Carol: The Unsung Story. Lion Hudson, 1994.
- The Map of Tolkien's Middle-earth, illustrated by John Howe. HarperCollins, 1994.
- There and Back Again: The Map of The Hobbit, illustrated by John Howe. HarperCollins, 1995.
- A Lively Oracle: A Centennial Celebration of P. L. Travers, Magical Creator of Mary Poppins, edited by Ellen Dooling Draper and Jenny Koralek (as contributor). Larson, 1999.
- The Map of Tolkien's Beleriand and the Lands to the North, illustrated by John Howe. HarperCollins, 1999.
- A Treasury of Narnia, with Alison Sage, illustrated by Pauline Baynes and Julek Heller. HarperCollins, 1999.
- Three Cheers for Pooh: A Celebration of the Best Bear in All the World, illustrated by E. H. Shepard. Egmont, 2001 and 2006, and Farshore, 2014.
- The Maps of Tolkien's Middle-earth, illustrated by John Howe. HarperCollins, 2003.
- The Road Goes Ever On and On: The Map of Tolkien's Middle-earth, revised, illustrated by John Howe. HarperCollins, 2003.
- There and Back Again: The Map of Tolkien's The Hobbit, revised, illustrated by John Howe. HarperCollins, 2003.
- West of the Mountains, East of the Sea: The Map of Tolkien's Beleriand, revised, illustrated by John Howe. HarperCollins, 2010.
- The Writer's Map: An Atlas of Imaginary Lands, edited by Huw Lewis-Jones (as contributor). Thames & Hudson, 2018.
- The Great Tales Never End: Essays in Memory of Christopher Tolkien, edited by Richard Ovenden and Catherine McIlwaine (as contributor). Bodleian Library Publishing, 2022.
- The Maps of Middle-earth, revised, illustrated by John Howe. HarperCollins, 2024.

=== Art ===
- The Book of Guinness Advertising. Guinness Superlatives, 1985.

=== Cinema and theatre ===
- Walt Disney's Mickey Mouse: His Life and Times, with Richard Holliss. Fleetway Books and Harper & Rowe, 1986.
- Walt Disney's Snow White and the Seven Dwarfs & the Making of the Classic Film, with Richard Holliss. Hyperion, 1987.
- The Disney Studio Story, with Richard Holliss. Octopus and Crown, 1988.
- Wallace and Gromit: A Close Shave: Storyboard Collection, with Nick Park. BBC Books, 1997.
- Cracking Animation: The Practical Book of 3-D Animation, with Peter Lord. Thames & Hudson, 1998, 2004, 2010 and 2015. (Also published by Harry N. Abrams as Creating 3-D Animation.)
- Wallace and Gromit: The Wrong Trousers: Storyboard Collection, with Nick Park. BBC Books, 1998.
- Chicken Run: Hatching the Movie. Harry N. Abrams, 2000.
- The Lord of the Rings: The Fellowship of the Ring: Insiders' Guide. HarperCollins, 2001.
- The Lord of the Rings: Official Movie Guide. HarperCollins, 2001.
- The Lord of the Rings: The Making of the Movie Trilogy. HarperCollins, 2002.
- The Golden Compass: The Official Illustrated Movie Companion. Scholastic, 2007.
- Mary Poppins: Anything Can Happen If You Let It, with Michael Lassell. Hyperion, 2007.
- Harry Potter: Film Wizardry. Bantam, 2010 and 2012 and HarperCollins, 2018.
- The Hobbit: An Unexpected Journey: Official Movie Guide. HarperCollins, 2012.
- The Making of The Pirates. Bloomsbury Publishing, 2012.
- The Hobbit: The Desolation of Smaug: Official Movie Guide. HarperCollins, 2013.
- The Hobbit: The Battle of the Five Armies: Official Movie Guide. HarperCollins, 2014.
- Weta Digital: 20 Years of Imagination on Screen, with Clare Burgess. HarperCollins, 2014.
- How to Be a Disney Historian, by Jim Korkis (as contributor). Theme Park Press, 2016.
- The Art and Making of Artemis Fowl. Disney, 2020.
- The Walt Disney Film Archives: The Animated Movies 1921-1968, edited by Daniel Kothenschulte (as contributor). Taschen, 2022.

=== Biography ===
- Shadowlands: The Story of C. S. Lewis and Joy Davidman. Hodder & Stoughton, 1985 and 1990. (Also published by the Fleming H. Revell Company as C. S. Lewis Through the Shadowlands in 1985, and by Hodder & Stoughton as Shadowlands: The True Story of C. S. Lewis and Joy Davidman in 1998).
- The Thomas the Tank Engine Man: The Story of the Reverend W. Awdry and his Really Useful Engines. Egmont, 1994, and William Heinemann, 1995.
- The Thomas the Tank Engine Man: The Story of the Reverend W. Awdry and his Really Useful Engines, revised edition, Lion Hudson, 2015.
- Peter Jackson: A Film-maker's Journey. HarperCollins, 2006.
- We Could Possibly Comment: Ian Richardson Remembered, by Sharon Mail (as contributor and editor). Matador, 2009.

=== Books edited by Sibley ===
- The Pooh Sketchbook, illustrated by E. H. Shepard. Methuen, 1982.
- Alice's Adventures in Wonderland, by Lewis Carroll, illustrated by Mervyn Peake. Methuen, 1983.
- The Pooh Book of Quotations, by A. A. Milne, illustrated by E. H. Shepard. Methuen, 1984.
- Alice's Adventures in Wonderland, by Lewis Carroll, illustrated by David Hall. Methuen and Simon & Schuster, 1986.
- Alice's Adventures in Wonderland, by Lewis Carroll, illustrated with Victorian lantern slides. Harry N. Abrams, 1988.
- The Wisdom of C. S. Lewis. Lion, 1997.
- The Fall of Númenor, by J. R. R. Tolkien, illustrated by Alan Lee. HarperCollins, 2022.

=== Books with front or back matter by Sibley ===
- Thomas the Tank Engine Treasury: Favourite Stories from the Railway Series, by The Rev. W. Awdry. Aura Books, 1997.
- Mary Poppins, by P. L. Travers. Collins, 1998.
- The Wind in the Willows, by Kenneth Grahame. Methuen, 1998.
- Walt Disney and Europe: European Influences on the Animated Feature Films of Walt Disney, by Robin Allan. Indiana University Press, 1999.
- The Complete Chronicles of Narnia, by C. S. Lewis. HarperCollins, 2000.
- The J. R. R. Tolkien Handbook: A Comprehensive Guide to His Life, Writings and World of Middle-earth, by Colin Duriez. Baker Books, 2000.
- The C. S. Lewis Chronicles: The Indispensable Biography of the Creator of Narnia, by Colin Duriez. Blue Bridge, 2005.
- Empires of the Imagination: A Critical Survey of Fantastic Cinema from George Méliès to The Lord of the Rings, by Alec Worley. McFarland, 2005.
- A Field Guide to Narnia, by Colin Duriez. Sutton, 2005.
- The Lord of the Rings: Popular Culture in Global Context, edited by Ernest Mathijs. Wallflower Press, 2006.
- The Art of Wallace and Gromit, by Beth Harwood. Egmont, 2009.
- Titus Awakes: The Lost Book of Gormenghast, by Maeve Gilmore. Vintage and The Overlook Press, 2011.
- The Art of Ian Miller, by Ian Miller and Tom Whyte. Titan Books, 2014.
- Hobitti eli Sinne ja takaisin, by J. R. R. Tolkien, illustrated by Tove Jansson. WSOY, 2017.
- Something Wicked This Way Comes, by Ray Bradbury. Simon & Schuster, 2017.
- From Spare Oom to War Drobe: Travels in Narnia with my nine-year-old self, by Katherine Langrish. Darton, Longman & Todd, 2021.
- Random Notes about Doodling, Sketching, Drawing, and Illustrating, by John Vernon Lord. Unseen Sketchbooks, 2024.

== Discography ==
=== CDs ===
- E. T. A. Hoffmann: The Nutcracker and the Mouse King. BBC Audio.
- C. S. Lewis: The Complete Chronicles of Narnia. BBC Audio.
- A. A. Milne: Enchanted Places: The Complete Fraser-Simson Settings of A. A. Milne. EM Records.
- Mervyn Peake and Maeve Gilmore: The History of Titus Groan. BBC Audio.
- J. R. R. Tolkien: The Lord of the Rings: The Collector's Edition. BBC Audio.
- J. R. R. Tolkien: Tales from the Perilous Realm. BBC Audio.
- P. L. Travers: Mary Poppins. BBC Audio.
- Jeff Wayne: Spartacus. Columbia.

=== DVDs ===
- 101 Dalmatians Platinum Edition (as interviewee).
- Animal Farm (1955) (as commentator).
- Around the World in Eighty Days (1957) (as commentator).
- The Boys: The Sherman Brothers' Story (as interviewee).
- Fantasia (1940) Platinum Edition (as commentator).
- Guerrilla Distribution (as cameo performer).
- The Jungle Book (1967) Platinum Edition (as interviewee).
- The Lord of the Rings: The Fellowship of the Ring 2-Disc Theatrical Edition (as interviewee).
- The Lord of the Rings: The Fellowship of the Ring 4-Disc Extended Edition (as interviewee).
- The Lord of the Rings: The Two Towers 4-Disc Extended Edition (as interviewee).
- The Lord of the Rings: The Return of the King 4-Disc Extended Edition (as interviewee).
- Mary Poppins 2-Disc 40th Anniversary Special Edition (as interviewee).
- The Narnia Code (as interviewee).
- Pinocchio (1940) Platinum Edition (as interviewee).
- Ringers: Lord of the Fans (as contributor).
- Sleeping Beauty (1959) Platinum Edition (as interviewee).
- Wallace and Gromit: The Wrong Trousers (as co-screenwriter)
- Walt Disney Treasures: The Chronological Donald (as interviewee).
- Walt Disney Treasures: Dr Syn (as interviewee).

=== Blu-rays ===
- Alice in Wonderland (1951) 60th Anniversary Edition (as interviewee).
- Beauty and the Beast (1991) Diamond Edition (as interviewee).
- Fantasia (1940) 2-Movie Collection (as interviewee).
- Snow White and the Seven Dwarfs (1937) Diamond Edition (as interviewee).
