= Gormenghast (series) =

Series of fantasy novels written by Mervyn Peake

- Titus Groan (1946); Gormenghast (1950); Boy in Darkness (1956); Titus Alone (1959); Titus Awakes (2011)
- Author: Mervyn Peake
- Country: United Kingdom
- Language: English
- Genre: Gothic novel; Fantasy novel
- Publisher: Eyre & Spottiswoode
- Media type: Print (hardback & paperback)

Gormenghast (/ˈɡɔːrmənɡɑːst/) is a fantasy series by British author Mervyn Peake, about the inhabitants of Castle Gormenghast, a sprawling, decaying, Gothic structure. Originally conceived as a single on-going novel, the series was ended by Peake's death and comprises three novels: Titus Groan (1946), Gormenghast (1950) and Titus Alone (1959); and a novella, Boy in Darkness (1956). Peake was writing a fourth novel, Titus Awakes, at the time of his death in 1968. The book was completed by Peake's widow Maeve Gilmore in the 1970s, but was not published until 2011 after it was discovered by their family.

Although the first two books do not contain any overtly fantastical elements, Gormenghast is almost unanimously categorised as fantasy because of the atmosphere and pseudo-medieval setting. The series has received widespread acclaim from the speculative fiction community and mainstream literary critics.

The series has been included in Fantasy: The 100 Best Books, Modern Fantasy: The 100 Best Novels and 100 Must Read Fantasy Novels as one of the greatest fantasy works of the twentieth century. In his book The Western Canon, literary critic Harold Bloom included the series among the 20th century works he predicted to be canonised. Elsewhere, he called it the "marvelous Gormenghast trilogy" and indicated a preference for it over the fantasy writings of the Inklings, namely J. R. R. Tolkien, C. S. Lewis and Charles Williams. Gormenghast is often credited as the first fantasy of manners novel. The books have been translated into over twenty languages.

== Works ==
The series comprises three books: Titus Groan (1946), Gormenghast (1950) and Titus Alone (1959). A short book, Boy in Darkness (1956), tells the story of a brief adventure by the young Titus away from Gormenghast, although it does not name the castle.

Peake had intended to write a series of books following Titus Groan through his life, as well as detailing his relationship with Gormenghast. At least two other books, tentatively titled Titus Awakes and Gormenghast Revisited, were planned but Parkinson's disease and Peake's ensuing death at the age of 57 prevented him from writing more than a few hundred words and ideas for further volumes. Only three pages of Titus Awakes were coherently written and can be found in the Overlook Press edition of Titus Alone (ISBN 0-87951-427-2) and in the omnibus volume (ISBN 0-87951-628-3).

In the 1970s, Peake's widow Maeve Gilmore wrote her version of Titus Awakes, which she called Search Without End. The Peake family announced the discovery of this book in 2010, and it was published by The Overlook Press as Titus Awakes: The Lost Book of Gormenghast in 2011 to coincide with the 100th anniversary of Peake's birth.

== Setting ==
Gormenghast is a remote and reclusive earldom dominated by the huge Castle Gormenghast at its centre, and ruled by the noble family of Groan since time immemorial. The earldom derives its name from Gormenghast Mountain, and is isolated from the outside world by inhospitable regions on each side of it. To the North are marshy wastelands, to the South are grey salt marshes (and presumably then the ocean), to the East are quicksands and the tideless sea, and to the West are knuckles of endless rock.

To the West also lies the claw-like Gormenghast Mountain, with the Twisted Woods and Gormenghast River at its foot. East of them are escarpments described as "an irregular tableland of greeny-black rock, broken and scarred and empty", then desolate swamp before the vicinity of the castle is reached. Gormenghast Mountain is said to be so large that from the castle it looks at most a few miles distant, whereas in fact it is a day's ride away on horseback. However, this is contradicted by events within the story, when various characters are able to travel on foot to the castle and back within a single day. Given that it is surrounded on three sides by watery regions, it is not implausible that the entire region can be flooded, as described in the second book, Gormenghast.

At the centre of the earldom is the vast, largely deserted castle, whose remaining inhabitants centre their lives on the ritual surrounding the ruling family of Groan. The castle is described as being like an immense island of stone, its every outline familiar to the inhabitants, who know "every bay, inlet and headland of the great stone island of the Groans, of its sheer cliffs, of its crumbling outcrops, the broken line of the towers". Dominating the ivy-covered, crumbling castle is the highest tower, the Tower of Flints, which is inhabited by great numbers of owls. The castle is so huge that most of the inhabitants do not venture outside except for ceremonies. Outside the castle, clustered under the northern walls, is a hodge-podge of mud dwellings inhabited by the "Bright Carvers", villagers whose only contact with the aristocrats is their annual ritual of carving elaborate objects out of wood and presenting them to the Earl for his judging of the winning carving. They are in awe of the "Castles", as they call Gormenghast's elite inhabitants.

Some contact with the outside world is implied; Dr Prunesquallor at one point sketches an ostrich skeleton, while Steerpike procures a monkey from somewhere. Otherwise, the impression given is that Gormenghast is stagnant, insular and introspective. A recurring theme is the time-consuming, complex and pointless rituals that the inhabitants submit to regularly, the origin and purpose of which is long forgotten. Gormenghast makes a stark contrast with the industrious and technologically advanced city that is the setting of Titus Alone.

== Story ==
=== Titus Groan ===
The story begins with the birth of the eponymous Titus, as the heir to the throne of the House of Groan, and finishes just over a year later with his "Earling" or formal investiture as the seventy-seventh Earl of Groan, after the untimely death of his father Sepulchrave. As Titus is only an infant in this novel, he plays a minor role. The main plot therefore follows the somewhat bizarre inhabitants of Gormenghast Castle, and in particular chronicles the rise to power of Steerpike, a scheming kitchen boy. Steerpike successfully destroys the existing order of the castle by inciting the power-hungry and shunned twin sisters of Sepulchrave, Cora and Clarice, to burn Sepulchrave's beloved library. This event drives Sepulchrave into madness and eventually into taking his own life. Although Cora and Clarice are not exposed as the perpetrators of the fire, they are now under Steerpike's power. A subplot involves the feud between Sepulchrave's loyal servant Flay and the chef Swelter, which ends in a fight to the death.

=== Gormenghast ===
The second book follows Titus from the age of seven to seventeen. As the 77th earl and lord of Gormenghast, he dreads the life of pre-ordained ritual that stretches before him. His desire for freedom is awakened by the sight of his foster sister, known only as "The Thing", a feral child who lives in the woods of Gormenghast (due to her mother being banished as an outcast) and who terrorizes the Bright Carvers, the inhabitants of the mud dwellings outside the castle walls. Her life of wild freedom makes him realise that an existence is possible other than the rigid formalities and ritual of the castle. Meanwhile, Steerpike continues his rise to power by killing Barquentine, the Master of Ritual, and taking his place, but he is eventually unmasked as a traitor and murderer. The castle is flooded by a rainstorm, and in a watery duel with Titus, Steerpike is killed, leaving the way clear for Titus to reign. However, his desire to leave Gormenghast is now overwhelming, Titus flees the castle for the wider world beyond Gormenghast Mountain.

=== Titus Alone ===
The story follows Titus as he travels far from Gormenghast and finds a futuristic city dominated by scientists and advanced technology. He then travels to a region where a huge modern factory stands by a lake, filled with identical-looking workers. There is a smell of death from the factory and it is hinted that sinister experiments are taking place there. Titus is increasingly haunted by his memories of Gormenghast and begins to realise its importance to his identity. At the same time, the world he encounters is so different from his old home that he begins to doubt that Gormenghast ever really existed.

Titus is helped by mysterious inhabitants he meets, such as Muzzlehatch, the owner of a zoo, who drives a shark-shaped car and becomes a friend and mentor. He is also helped by Muzzlehatch's former lover, Juno, who in turn becomes Titus's lover for a brief period. However, Titus also becomes involved with Cheeta, the daughter of the scientist who runs the factory, and who grows to hate Titus and sets out to destroy him. A heavily edited first edition was published in 1959; a fuller version compiled by Langdon Jones from Peake's early drafts was issued in 1970 and forms the basis for all subsequent editions.

== Characters ==
Peake populated his imaginary world with a large cast of characters. These include:

=== Ruling family ===
Titus Groan: The main character of the series, and heir to the Earldom of Gormenghast. He succeeds to the title of 77th Earl while still a child, but as he grows older, he develops ambivalent feelings toward his home. He is torn between pride in his lineage and the desire to escape from the castle and its traditions. Titus is born at the beginning of the first book of the series, the son of Sepulchrave and Gertrude, and is an infant throughout the whole of Titus Groan. He grows up and reaches young adulthood in the second book Gormenghast, which ends with him leaving Gormenghast after defeating Steerpike in battle. In the third book, Titus Alone, Titus discovers a world outside of Gormenghast where the castle and its inhabitants are unknown. Titus also features in another book called Boy in Darkness, which appears to take place during his youth in Gormenghast, but which is unconnected to the main story. Titus's character is one of yearning for freedom and the romance of being an ordinary person without the restrictions and responsibilities of the Earldom and the tradition that comes with it.

As for Titus, he was almost grown now to his full height. But he was of an odd highly-strung nature—sullen and excitable by turns. Strong as need be for his years, he was more apt to have his energy sapped by the excess of his imagination than of his body.

Lord Sepulchrave: 76th Earl and Titus's father. He is a melancholy man who feels shackled by his duties as Earl, although he never questions them. His only escape is reading. However, when the castle's Library is burnt down, he is driven insane and comes to believe that he is one of the death-owls that live in the abandoned Tower of Flints.

His face was very long and was olive coloured. The eyes were large, and of an eloquence, withdrawn. His nostrils were mobile and sensitive. His mouth, a narrow line.

The Countess Gertrude: 76th Countess and Titus's mother. An immense, statuesque woman with coils of dark red hair, she pays little attention to her family or the rest of Gormenghast. Instead, she spends her time locked away in her bedroom, in the company of a legion of cats and birds, the only beings toward which she shows affection. However, when required to use her intelligence she turns out to be one of the cleverest people in the castle, when (along with Flay and the doctor) she recognizes and investigates the worrying changes transpiring in Gormenghast. She demonstrates unexpected leadership qualities during the flooding of the castle and hunt for Steerpike, but once those threats have passed she retreats back into her isolated world. According to Sepulchrave's sisters, the Ladies Cora and Clarice, Gertrude is of common blood and not of the noble bloodline of the Groans.

As the candles guttered or flared, so the shadows moved from side to side, or up and down the wall, and with those movements behind the bed there swayed the shadows of four birds. Between them vacillated an enormous head. This umbrage was cast by her ladyship, the seventy-sixth Countess of Groan. She was propped against several pillows and a black shawl was draped around her shoulders. Her hair, a very dark red colour of great lustre, appeared to have been left suddenly while being woven into a knotted structure on the top of her head. Thick coils still fell about her shoulder or clustered on the pillows like burning snakes.

Her eyes were of the pale green that is common among cats. They were large eyes, yet seemed, in proportion to the pale area of her face, to be small. The nose was big enough to appear so in spite of the expanse that surrounded it. The effect which she produced was one of bulk ...

Lady Fuchsia Groan: Titus's older sister. Fanciful, impatient, immature, and self-absorbed, she can also be impulsively warm and caring. She at first resents Titus but develops a deep bond with him. Of all Titus's family, she is the one he loves most. Fuchsia also experiences a brief bond with her father, Lord Sepulchrave, during his mental breakdown after the library fire. Broken by years of loss, disappointment, and disillusionment, she is killed as she accidentally slips from the windowsill where she was standing contemplating suicide. As she falls, she strikes her head on the stonework, and drowns unconscious in the floodwaters surrounding the Castle.

... a girl of about fifteen with long, rather wild black hair. She was gauche in movement and in a sense ugly of face, but with how small a twist might she not suddenly have become beautiful. Her sullen mouth was full and rich – her eyes smouldered.

A yellow scarf hung loosely around her neck. Her shapeless dress was flaming red.

For all the straightness of her back she walked with a slouch.

Cora and Clarice Groan: Titus's aunts (sisters of Sepulchrave) are identical twins. They experienced spasms and 'fits' in their youth that temporarily paralysed the left-hand sides of their bodies. Their personalities appear indistinguishable and their combined conduct and conversation devoid of insight or intelligence — although Cora believes that she is slightly cleverer than Clarice, their thoughts and motivations run along the same lines. Both crave political power and bitterly resent Gertrude, who they believe has robbed them of their rightful place in the hierarchy of Gormenghast. Their witless desire for the adulation they believe due to them by inheritance and their thirst for revenge against their brother's consort lead them to become Steerpike's pawns.

She and her sister were dressed in purple, with gold buckles at their throats by way of brooches, and another gold buckle each at the end of hatpins which they wore through their grey hair in order apparently to match their brooches. Their faces, identical to the point of indecency, were quite expressionless, as though they were the preliminary lay-outs for faces and were waiting for sentience to be injected.

=== Other Castle dwellers ===
Alongside the Groan family there is a large population within the castle who service its daily needs. The "castles", as they are known to distinguish them from the Bright Carvers, are socially stratified. From the regarded Dr. Prunesquallor and the professors to the lowly grey scrubbers, whose sole job is to clean the walls of the kitchen. However lowly the position of the "Castles" may be, they consider themselves to be far superior to the Bright Carvers who live outside the castle walls.

Steerpike: A youthful outsider, beginning as a kitchen boy, who worms his way into the hierarchy of Gormenghast for his own personal gain. Ruthlessly murderous, with a Machiavellian, highly intelligent and methodical mind, and a talent for manipulation, he can appear charming and sometimes even noble. But due to his fundamentally evil nature, he has natural personal enmity with Titus. He is finally hunted down and killed by Titus, who holds him responsible for the death of his sister, Fuchsia.

His body gave the appearance of being malformed, but it would be difficult to say exactly what gave it this gibbous quality. Limb by limb it appeared that he was sound enough, but the sum of these several members accrued to an unexpectedly twisted total. His face was pale like clay and save for his eyes, masklike. These eyes were set very close together, and were small, dark red, and of startling concentration.

Mr Flay: Lord Sepulchrave's personal servant, who believes in strictly holding to the rules of Gormenghast. Nevertheless, he is not completely hard-hearted and cares a great deal for Titus and Fuchsia. He is eventually exiled from Gormenghast for throwing one of the Countess's cats at Steerpike. However, he secretly keeps an eye on the doings in the castle, and plays a crucial role in Steerpike's eventual unmasking as a traitor.

Mr Flay appeared to clutter up the doorway as he stood revealed, his arms folded ... It did not look as though such a bony face as this could give normal utterance, but rather that instead of sounds, something more brittle, more ancient, something drier would emerge, something more in the nature of a splinter or a fragment of stone. Nevertheless, the harsh lips parted. "It's me," he said, and took a step forward into the room, his joints cracking as he did so. His passage across a room – in fact his passage through life – was accomplished by these cracking sounds, one per step, which might be likened to the breaking of dry twigs.

Dr Alfred Prunesquallor: The castle's resident physician. He is an eccentric individual with a high-pitched laugh and a grandiose wit which he uses on the castle's less intelligent inhabitants. Despite his acid tongue, he is an extremely kind and caring man who also is greatly fond of Fuchsia and Titus. (Several times, Prunesquallor's first name is given as "Bernard", but this inconsistency is considered an error on Peake's part.) Although he appears at first to be foppish and weak, the doctor later shows himself to be both intelligent and courageous, and he plays an important role in defeating Steerpike.

The doctor with his hyena laugh and his bizarre and elegant body, his celluloid face.

His main defects? The insufferable pitch of his voice; his maddening laugh and his affected gestures. His cardinal virtue? An undamaged brain.

Irma Prunesquallor: Doctor Prunesquallor's sister. Though she is anything but pretty, she is considerably vain. She desperately desires to be admired and loved by men. She becomes romantically involved with Bellgrove.

Vain as a child; thin as a stork's leg, and, in her black glasses, blind as an owl in daylight. She misses her footing on the social ladder at least three times a week, only to start climbing again, wriggling her pelvis the while. She clasps her dead, white hands beneath her chin in the high hope of hiding the flatness of her chest.

Abiatha Swelter: The fat, sadistic head chef of Gormenghast. His profound hatred for Flay leads him to attempt his murder; however, he is killed by his intended victim.

... Abiatha Swelter, who wades in a slug-like illness of fat through the humid ground mists of the Great Kitchen. From hazy progs and flesh-pots half afloat, from bowls as big as baths, there rises and drifts like a miasmic tide the all but palpable odour of the day's belly-timber. ... The arrogance of this fat head exudes itself like an evil sweat.

Nannie Slagg: An ancient wrinkled doll-like 'dwarf' who nurses the infant Titus and Fuchsia before him. Nervous, self-pitying, child-like and lacking both mental agility and emotional comprehension, her life has been spent in service to the revered mores of Gormenghast. When called upon to perform the ceremonies accorded to her role, the combination of her reverence for the House, her intrinsic inferiority complex and simple concern for the comfort of the children render her muddled and terrfied. With her charges, she is prone to dramas of wounded feelings but her devotion, and loving nature, means she is the only figure of affection to the young Titus and Fuschia.

... she is so minute, so frightened, so old, so querulous, she neither could, nor would, head any procession, even on paper. Her peevish cry goes out: "Oh, my weak heart! How could they?" and she hurries to Fuchsia either to smack the abstracted girl in order to ease herself, or to bury the wrinkled prune of her face in Fuchsia's side. Alone in her small room again, she lies upon her bed and bites her minute knuckles.

Sourdust: The Master of Ritual when the series begins. He is the one who coordinates the various arcane rituals that make up daily life in Gormenghast. After his death in the Library Fire, his position is taken up by his son Barquentine.

His beard was knotted and the hairs that composed it were black and white. His face was very lined, as though it had been made of brown paper that had been crunched by some savage hand before being hastily smoothed out and spread over the tissues. His eyes were deep-set and almost lost in the shadows cast by his fine brow, which for all its wrinkles, retained a sweeping breadth of bone.

Barquentine: Follows his father into the role of Master of Ritual. He is lame in one leg, hideous, and unbelievably dirty. He is a consummate misanthrope who abuses and insults everybody he meets, and who cares only for the rigid application of the laws and traditions of Gormenghast. He makes the grievous error of allowing Steerpike to become his assistant.

The lynch-pin son of the dead Sourdust, by name Barquentine, Master of Ritual, is a stunted, cantankerous pedant of seventy, who stepped into his father's shoes (or, to be exact, into his shoe, for this Barquentine is a one-legged thing who smites his way through ill-lit corridors on a grim and echoing crutch).

Bellgrove: School Professor. One of Titus's teachers, who eventually ascends to Headmaster of Gormenghast. In many respects, he is the standard absent-minded professor who falls asleep during his own class and plays with marbles. However, deep inside him there is a certain element of dignity and nobility. At heart he is kindly, and if weak, at least has the humility to be aware of his faults. He begins a rather unusual romance with Irma Prunesquallor. He becomes something of a father figure to Titus.

He was a fine-looking man in his way. Big of head, his brow and the bridge of his nose descended in a single line of undeniable nobility. His jaw was as long as his brow and nose together and lay exactly parallel in profile to those features. With his leonine shock of snow-white hair there was something of the major prophet about him. But his eyes were disappointing. They made no effort to bear out the promise of the other features, which would have formed the ideal setting for the kind of eye that flashes with visionary fire. Mr Bellgrove's eyes didn't flash at all.

=== Bright Carvers ===
Also known as the Mud Dwellers or the Outer Dwellers, the Bright Carvers live directly outside the castle walls, crammed closely together in hovels of mud and straw. Their lives are hard and monotonous, and they live solely on jarl root (a kind of tree growing in Gormenghast forest), and crusts of bread lowered down from the castle walls each morning. Their sole obsession is the carving of beautiful wooden sculptures, brightly painted, which they present to the Groans on a particular day each year in June. Only three of these carvings are chosen by the Earl of Gormenghast to be kept and the rest are burnt. Fierce rivalry exists between the Carvers to present the best carvings, and their lives are dominated by this and by their own long-held feuds and grudges against each other. The Bright Carvers are a race apart from the Castle dwellers, living by their own cultural norms and customs, which are impenetrable to outsiders.

Keda: A woman from the Bright Carvers' village just outside the walls of Gormenghast. She is chosen to be Titus's wet nurse, but eventually leaves this position. She has two lovers, Braigon and Rantel, who fight a duel and both die for her, but not before one of them impregnates her. Eventually, she kills herself by leaping off a crag, after giving birth to a daughter – The Thing.

Dark, almost lambent like a topaz, she is still young, her sole disfigurement the universal bane of the Outer Dwellers, the premature erosion of an exceptional beauty — a deterioration that follows with merciless speed upon an adolescence almost spectral.

The Thing: The daughter of Keda, foster sister of Titus. Due to her illegitimacy, she is an outcast who becomes a feral child living in the wilderness surrounding Gormenghast. She is fierce and untameable, living only for herself, and takes her revenge on the Bright Carvers by mutilating their carvings. Believing that she is in every way the opposite of Gormenghast, Titus becomes infatuated with her. She is killed by a bolt of lightning.

No: the face was more mask-like than expressive. It symbolized her way of life, not her immediate thoughts. It was the colour of a robin's egg, and as closely freckled. Her hair was black and thick but she had hacked it away, a little above her shoulders. Her rounded neck was set upright upon her shoulders, and was so flexible that the liquid ease with which she turned it was reminiscent of a serpent.

=== Beyond Gormenghast ===
In Titus Alone Titus leaves Gormenghast and after a time spent wandering comes to the city, a futuristic place of glass and steel buildings, flying machines and other modern technology. Titus is disoriented by the huge contrast between the city and his old home, particularly since none of the people he meets have ever heard of Gormenghast or show much interest in it. In his journey through the city Titus meets a large number of characters, some friendly and some hostile. Later Titus leaves the city and travels to a land dominated by a sinister factory beside a lake.

Muzzlehatch is a man who drives around the city in a large shark-like car, who comes upon Titus lying faint on the waterfront and brings him home with him. He initially helps Titus not because he cares for him, but because he hates the city's police authorities, who are pursuing Titus as a vagrant. Muzzlehatch has a zoo at his house, and when not driving his car, he rides about on some of his animals, such as a stag or a llama. Despite his initial indifference, he becomes a mentor to Titus and helps him navigate his way about the city's confusing and dangerous life.

The driver, a great, gaunt, rudder-nosed man, square-jawed, long-limbed, and muscular, appeared to be unaware of the condition of his car or of the danger to himself or to the conglomeration of characters who lay tangled among their nets in the rotting 'stern' of the dire machine.

Juno is a former lover of Muzzlehatch, who agrees to be Titus's guardian when he is captured and put on trial, in order to save him from going to an institution. Although she is twice his age, she and Titus become lovers, in a passionate but brief affair. However, after the initial excitement of their liaison, Titus feels increasingly trapped and leaves Juno to strike out into the city on his own.

... Juno was a silhouette against the lighted entrance. From the full, rounded, and bell-shaped hips which swayed imperceptibly as she moved, arose the column of her almost military back; and from her shoulders sprang her neck, perfectly cylindrical, surmounted by her classic head.

Cheeta is a woman of about Titus's own age, who finds Titus wandering in a fever and nurses him back to health. In the process she becomes infatuated with him, and fascinated by his fevered ravings about Gormenghast. She is the daughter of a scientist who runs the factory where it is hinted at that sinister experiments are taking place. Although Titus is attracted to her, he spurns her advances, and she resolves to take her revenge. After hearing Titus telling many stories of Gormenghast, she arranges a mocking pageant or parade with grotesque caricatures of the inhabitants of the castle in order to humiliate him and unhinge his mind.

For hers was a presence not easily forgotten. Her body was exquisite. Her face indescribably quizzical. She was a modern. She had a new kind of beauty. Everything about her face was perfect in itself, yet curiously (from the normal point of view) misplaced. Her eyes were large and stormy grey, but were set a thought too far apart; yet not so far as to be immediately recognized. Her cheekbones were taut and beautifully carved, and her nose, straight as it was, yet gave the impression of verging, now on the retroussé side, now on the aquiline. As for the curl of her lips, it was like a creature half asleep, something that like a chameleon could change its colour ... Her mouth, today, was the colour of lilac blossom, very pale.

== Reception ==
The first book, Titus Groan, was published in 1946 to ecstatic reviews and the series has continued to grow in its critical reputation since Peake's death. Contemporary reviewers praise it for its iconic imagery and characters, and it is often cited as one of the greatest fantasy novels of all time. Anthony Burgess called the series uniquely brilliant and stated that it has rightfully been hailed as modern classic. In their review Punch opined that the series constituted "the finest imaginary feat in the English novel since Ulysses", while editor Langdon Jones commented that it was the sort of novel that one remembered for the rest of one's life and that he felt it should be required reading in secondary schools. The Daily Telegraph has described Steerpike as one of the all-time greatest villains in western literature.

== Accolades ==
- Gormenghast – 1950 Royal Society of Literature Ondaatje Prize
- Gormenghast – 1951 Heinemann Award
- Gormenghast – #6 Locus 1998 All-Time Fantasy Novel List
- Gormenghast – #84 The Big Read

== Adaptations ==
=== Radio ===
The Australian Broadcasting Corporation produced a dramatization of all three Gormenghast novels. It was first broadcast in 1983 as eight one-hour episodes, and repeated in 1986 in four two-hour parts. This is the first adaptation that includes Titus Alone in addition to Titus Groan and Gormenghast.

In 1984, BBC Radio 4 broadcast two 90-minute plays based on Titus Groan and Gormenghast, adapted by Brian Sibley and starring Sting as Steerpike and Freddie Jones as the Artist (narrator). A slightly abridged compilation of the two, running to 160 minutes, and titled Titus Groan of Gormenghast, was broadcast on Christmas Day, 1992. BBC 7 repeated the original versions on 21 and 28 September 2003.

In 2011, Brian Sibley, who had previously adapted the book for radio in 1984, adapted the story again, this time as six one-hour episodes broadcast on BBC Radio 4 as the Classic Serial starting on 10 July 2011. The serial was titled The History of Titus Groan and adapted all three novels written by Peake and the recently discovered concluding volume, Titus Awakes, completed by his widow, Maeve Gilmore. It starred Luke Treadaway as Titus, David Warner as the Artist and Carl Prekopp as Steerpike. Also starring were Paul Rhys (Sepulchrave), Miranda Richardson (Gertrude), James Fleet (Prunesquallor), Tamsin Greig (Irma Prunesquallor), Fenella Woolgar (Clarice Groan), Adrian Scarborough (Flay) and Mark Benton (Swelter).

=== Television ===
In 2000, the BBC and the PBS station WGBH of Boston produced Gormenghast, a four-part serial based on the first two books. The cast included Jonathan Rhys Meyers as Steerpike and Christopher Lee as Mr. Flay. The series achieved success on British television.

Also made in 2000, the 30-minute TV short film A Boy in Darkness (adapted from Peake's novella Boy in Darkness) was the first production from the BBC Drama Lab. It was set in a "virtual" computer-generated world created by young computer game designers, and starred Jack Ryder as "The Boy" (a teenage Titus Groan), with Terry Jones narrating.

In 2018 it was announced that Neil Gaiman and Akiva Goldsman would adapt the series into a television series for FremantleMedia.

=== Theatre ===
The minimalist stage version of Gormenghast dramatised by John Constable was performed by the David Glass Ensemble. Having premiered at the Alhambra Theatre Bradford in 1992, the play was performed at Battersea Arts Centre, the Lyric Theatre Hammersmith, and on UK and British Council international tours. Constable's stripped-down stage adaptation is published by Bloomsbury. It was directed by David Glass, combining mime with melodrama and magic realism, designed by Rae Smith with music by John Eacott. A revival of Gormenghast toured UK theatres during 2006 and 2007.

=== Music ===
Irmin Schmidt, founder of the seminal German experimental group Can, composed a three-act opera, Gormenghast, based on the novels. It premiered at the Opernhaus Wuppertal in 1998 and was released on CD the following year. A number of songs, including "Stranger Than Fiction" and "Titus" by New Zealand rock group Split Enz and "The Drowning Man" by The Cure, have been inspired by Peake's work. The British progressive rock group Strawbs feature a Ford/Hudson composition called "Lady Fuschia" (sic) on their 1973 album Bursting at the Seams, about one of the protagonists of this trilogy. Northern Irish progressive rock band Fruupp included a song called "Gormenghast", inspired by the novels, on their 1975 album Modern Masquerades. The early 1970s folk rock band Fuchsia was named after the character in the novels. The song "Room of Roots" on Al Stewart's 1970 album Zero She Flies is inspired by the chapter in Titus Groan about the tree roots painted by the sisters Cora and Clarice Groan; Mervyn Peake is credited in the sleeve notes. The 1970s progressive rock band Titus Groan took their name from the first volume of the trilogy and two songs were named after two book's chapters, "Fuschia" (sic) and "Hall of Bright Carvings".

== Influence ==
The Gormenghast series has influenced other fantasy works.

- M. John Harrison's Viriconium novels were inspired by Peake's trilogy.
- Michael Moorcock's 1978 novel Gloriana, or The Unfulfill'd Queen is an homage to the Gormenghast series. Moorcock dedicated the novel "to the memory of Mervyn Peake".
- China Miéville's 2000 novel Perdido Street Station was influenced by the Gormenghast trilogy.
- In George R. R. Martin's book series A Song of Ice and Fire a House Peake is mentioned, ruling the castle of Starpike. The present Lord Peake is called Titus. Tales of Dunk and Egg feature a Lord Gormon Peake, and The World of Ice & Fire mentions Lord Unwin Peake's bastard brother Mervyn Flowers.
