= Boy in Darkness =

1956 novella by Mervyn Peake

- First standalone edition
- Author: Mervyn Peake
- Illustrator: P. J. Lynch
- Language: English
- Genre: Horror
- Publisher: Eyre & Spottiswoode (collection, 1956); Wheaton, Exeter (standalone, 1976)
- Publication place: Great Britain
- Pages: 114
- ISBN: 0-340-68323-6
- OCLC: 59632014

Boy in Darkness is a novella by English writer Mervyn Peake. It was first published in 1956 by Eyre & Spottiswoode as part of the anthology Sometime, Never: Three Tales of Imagination (with other stories by William Golding and John Wyndham). A "corrupt" version of Boy in Darkness (a typist had misread Peake's handwriting in some places) was published both in an anthology, The Inner Landscape (published in 1969 by Allison & Busby, edited anonymously by Michael Moorcock), and separately in 1976 (by educational publisher Wheaton & Co.) with an introduction by Peake's widow, Maeve Gilmore. Referring to the corrupt text, she wrote that "although the Boy in Boy in Darkness is assuredly Titus Groan, [Peake] did not call him so by name"; however, adding the name Titus was one of the specific changes that Peake made between writing and publishing his novella. The correct text has recently become available again in an anthology entitled Boy in Darkness and Other Stories, with a foreword by Joanne Harris and a preface by Peake's son Sebastian, as well as Maeve Gilmore's uncorrected introduction from 1976.

Upon publication of the work in 1956, a Glasgow Herald reviewer called it "completely hair-raising". Edwin Morgan referred to Boy in Darkness as a "very different" piece, "a nouvelle, a sinister epic incident, a reflection in miniature of Titus Groan and Gormenghast." The story is one of Mervyn Peake's last prose works. After this he wrote only Titus Alone (1959); by the time it was published, dementia had made writing almost impossible for him, although he continued to draw, intermittently, for several more years.

== Plot summary ==
Boy in Darkness is an episode in the Gormenghast series when Titus Groan, referred to as "the Boy" in the story, is a young teenager – placing it during the period covered by the second novel in the series, Gormenghast. Yearning for freedom from his ceaseless duties as 77th Earl of Gormenghast, he escapes the ancient castle and encounters the nightmare world outside.

== Adaptations ==
Boy in Darkness was made into a short film in 2000. Created by the BBC Drama Lab, it utilized computer generated imagery and was set in a virtual world. The film starred Jack Ryder (of EastEnders fame) as Titus, with Terry Jones (of Monty Python's Flying Circus) narrating.

Boy in Darkness was adapted for the stage by theatre company Curious Directive and performed at the 2009 Edinburgh Festival Fringe, at Zoo Venues. The Stage heralded it as a "Must See" saying the production was "Dark, haunting and uniquely inventive... Curious Directive’s adaptation of Mervyn Peake's story is nothing short of phenomenal".

Boy in Darkness was again adapted and performed for the stage by Gareth Murphy and produced by the Blue Elephant Theatre, London, in 2015 to great acclaim. It was a solo performance which The Stage described as "A physical theatre gem".
