= Maeve Gilmore =

English artist and writer

- Born: Maeve Patricia Mary Theresa Gilmore; 14 June 1917; Brixton, London, England
- Died: 3 August 1983 (aged 66)
- Education: Westminster School of Art
- Occupations: Painter; sculptor; writer
- Spouse: Mervyn Peake (m. 1937; died 1968)
- Children: 3
- Relatives: Henry Lascelles Carr (grandfather); Ernest Cromwell Peake (father-in-law); Phyllida Barlow (daughter-in-law); Eddie Peake (grandson); Jack Peñate (grandson)
- Writing career
- Notable works: A World Away: A Memoir of Mervyn Peake (1970); Titus Awakes: The Lost Book of Gormenghast (1970)
- Website: www.maevegilmore.com

Maeve Patricia Mary Theresa Gilmore (married name Peake; 14 June 1917 – 3 August 1983) was a British painter, sculptor and writer. Known primarily for her writing, a retrospective of Gilmore's artwork was held in 2022.

== Early life and family ==
Gilmore was born on 14 June 1917 in Brixton, London to Owen Eugene Gilmore (1862–1950), a physician, and Matty Lascelles Gilmore (née Carr; died 1944). The youngest of six siblings, Gilmore was the maternal granddaughter of the newspaper proprietor Henry Lascelles Carr. Raised at 49 Acre Lane in Brixton, the family later moved to Chelsea Square.

Educated at St Leonards-Mayfield School from 1929 to 1934, Gilmore subsequently attended the Villa Beata finishing school in Fribourg where she learnt to speak French and German. Upon leaving finishing school in 1935, Gilmore travelled across Spain. The following year Gilmore enrolled at the Westminster School of Art, where she met her future husband Mervyn Peake. In 1937, Gilmore travelled across Europe where she attended, and was greatly influenced by, the 1937 Paris Exhibition. Whilst in Europe, Gilmore studied at an art school in Bonn.

== Career ==
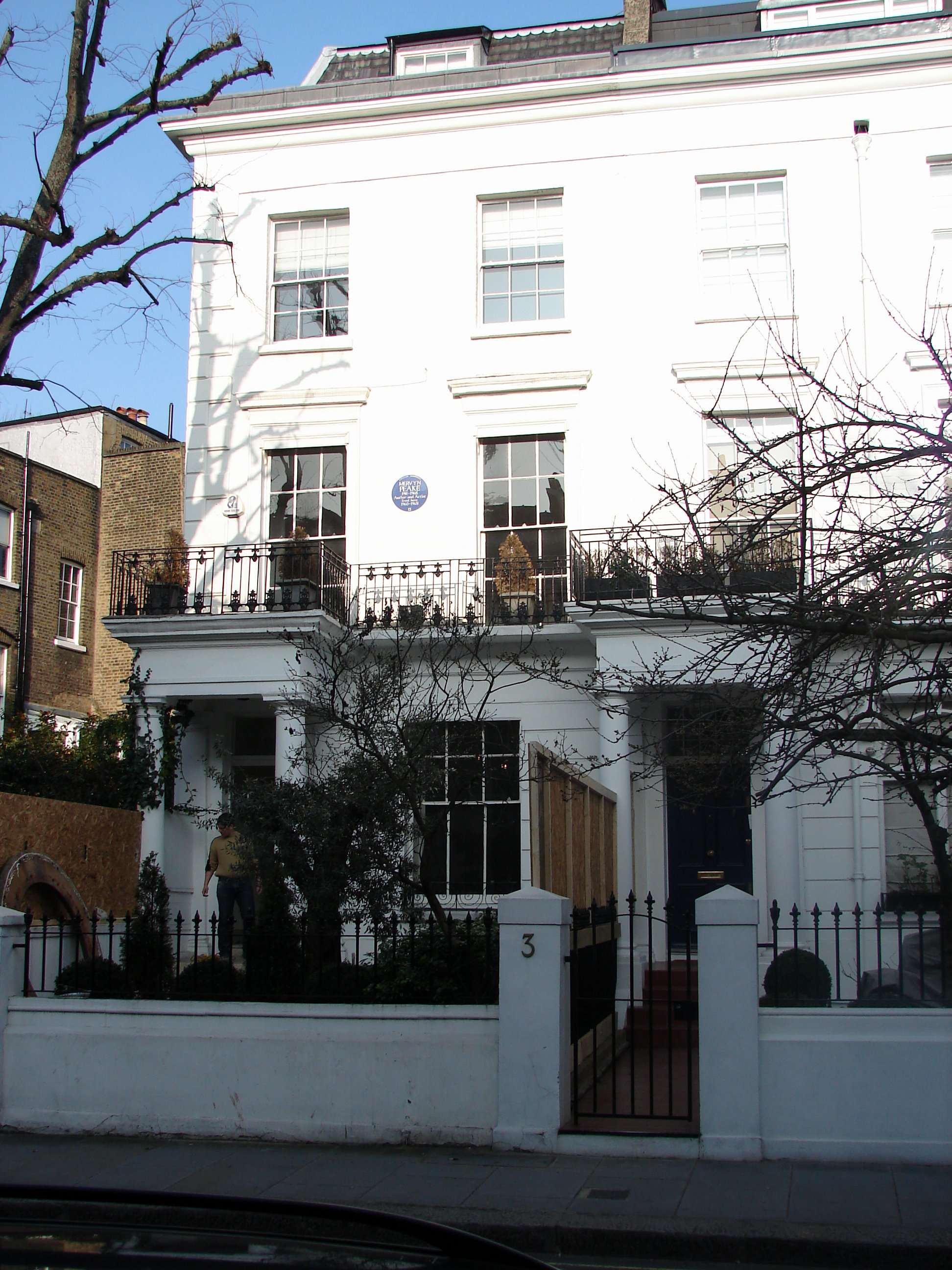
1 Drayton Gardens, Kensington and Chelsea, the family home she decorated.

Following art college, Gilmore exhibited her work at galleries in London. Her style was influenced by the modernist and avant-garde movements. Peake and Gilmore married on 1 December 1937. The couple had three children, the artist and writer Sebastian Peake, the artist and poet Fabian Peake and the writer Clare Peake. However, the Second World War, marriage and Peake's illness curtailed her public artistic career. She continued to paint, including covering the walls and furniture of the family home in Drayton Gardens in Chelsea with murals. Her earlier works were portraits and still life, with her children as later subjects as her style became more abstract. These were documented in detailed photographs before the family sold the house after her death. However, when Peake became ill, she put her career on hold to care for him. Her memoir A World Away (1970) was written in the years immediately following Peake's death, and depicts their life together.

She exhibited at the Langton Gallery in London in 1979. In 1981 she published a children's book, Captain Eustace and the Magic Room, that she had written and illustrated with dolls, working with artist Kenneth Welfare. On 3 August 1983, Gilmore died in London aged 66.

=== Titus Awakes ===
In the late 1950s, Peake's health began to decline and he finished Titus Alone, the third novel in his series of Titus books, following Titus Groan (1946), and Gormenghast (1950), only with difficulty. When published in 1959, Titus Alone was less polished than he might have wished, but he was beyond correcting it. He had always planned a longer series, taking his hero up to his forties at least. On his death from dementia with Lewy bodies in November 1968, Peake left a few pages of notes for a fourth book, of which fewer than a thousand words are legible.

During the 1970s, Gilmore worked on the fourth Titus book herself, inspired partly by the list of people and places that Peake had imagined might feature in it. By 1980, she had completed a narrative she called Search Without End. It told the story of Titus backwards – not returning to Gormenghast, but to Sark where his creator Peake had lived in the early 1930s and again between 1946 and 1949, taking in along the way some of Peake's experiences (as a Parkinsonian patient in hospital, for example). In her final version, however, she avoided mentioning any name or event from the Titus books, with the exception of the name of the hero, so that her book could be read independently of her husband's work. She showed it to a few people, who did not encourage her to seek publication.

Early in 2010, Gilmore's children and grandchildren decided to publish it in time for the centenary of Mervyn Peake's birth in July 2011. Of the various versions, they preferred one that made direct reference to the Titus books, and arranged for the publisher, Vintage (in the UK; Overlook in the USA), to reprint Peake's notes as the first chapter. They called it by one of Peake's titles for his own novel, "Titus Awakes", subtitling it The Lost Book of Gormenghast.

Reviewing Titus Awakes, Michael Moorcock declared it "a fascinating, intensely personal homage", saying that Gilmore "successfully echoes the music of the originals, if not the eloquent precision of Peake's baroque style as she sends Titus on his adventure."

== Posthumous re-discovery ==
Some of her work was exhibited at the Ancient & Modern gallery, London in 2014.

In 2022 a retrospective exhibition of her art was held at Studio Voltaire in Clapham, south London, which called it her first institutional exhibition, and situated her alongside contemporaries such as Vanessa Bell and Winifred Knights, and Surrealists Leonora Carrington, Eileen Agar and Ithell Colquhoun. Its subject was family life, especially their children. It was reviewed in Apollo and by Rachel Campbell-Johnston in The Times. The Guardian called her "a shrewd and loving observer of domestic life" who "belongs in the company of women who deserve respect for their artistry, not pity for their disadvantages." Her story was featured on BBC Radio 4 Woman's Hour

== Bibliography ==
- Gilmore, Maeve (1970). A World Away: A Memoir of Mervyn Peake.
- Gilmore, Maeve (1970). Titus Awakes: The Lost Book of Gormenghast.
- Gilmore, Maeve; Johnson, Shelagh (1974). Mervyn Peake: Writings & Drawings. London: Academy Editions.
- Gilmore, Maeve; Welfare, Kenneth (1981). Captain Eustace and the Magic Room. London: Methuen Children's Books. ISBN 9780416890204.
