= Titus Groan =

1946 Gothic novel by Mervyn Peake

- 1946 first edition cover
- Author: Mervyn Peake
- Cover artist: Mervyn Peake
- Language: English
- Series: Gormenghast
- Genre: Gothic
- Publisher: Eyre & Spottiswoode
- Publication date: 1946
- Publication place: United Kingdom
- Media type: Print (hardback and paperback)
- Pages: 438
- OCLC: 2951128
- Dewey Decimal: 823.914
- Followed by: Gormenghast

Titus Groan is a Gothic novel by Mervyn Peake, first published in 1946. It is the first novel in the Gormenghast series. The other books in the series are the novels Gormenghast (1950) and Titus Alone (1959) and the novella Boy in Darkness (1956).

== Plot introduction ==
The book is set in the huge castle of Gormenghast, a vast landscape of crumbling towers and ivy-filled quadrangles that has for centuries been the hereditary residence of the Groan family and with them a legion of servants. The Groan family is headed by Lord Sepulchrave, the seventy-sixth Earl of Groan. He is a melancholy man who feels shackled by his duties as Earl, although he never questions them. His only escape is reading in his library. His wife is the Countess Gertrude. Large and imposing, with dark red hair, she pays no attention to her family or to the rest of Gormenghast. Instead, she spends her time either in her bedroom or in walking selected areas, in the company of a legion of birds and her white cats that alone command her affections. Their daughter is 15-year-old Fuchsia Groan, attended to by the easily upset Nannie Slagg. Self-absorbed, childish and thoughtless, she is also impulsive, imaginative and at times fiercely affectionate. Sequestered in the south wing of the castle are Sepulchrave's identical twin sisters Cora and Clarice Groan, notable for always being dressed in purple. Both suffered from epileptic fits in their youth, as a result of which their left arms and legs are "rather starved". They have the same vague and vacant personalities, lacking intelligence to the point of intellectual disability. Both crave political power and bitterly resent Gertrude, believing that she robbed them of their rightful place in the hierarchy of Gormenghast and of any involvement in its affairs. This desire for power, along with their general ignorance, allows for them to be easily manipulated by Steerpike in his quest for authority. Also important to the life of the castle is Lord Sepulchrave's personal servant, Mr. Flay, who believes in strictly adhering to the rules of Gormenghast.

At the beginning of the novel, two agents of change are introduced into the stagnant society of Gormenghast.

The first catalyst is the birth of Titus Groan, the heir to Lord Sepulchrave, which interrupts the centuries-old daily rituals which are practised at all levels of the castle's society, from the kitchens to the Hall of Bright Carvings in Gormenghast's upper reaches. Though he is the title character and integral to the plot, Titus appears only infrequently as an infant during his first two years of life.

The second is Steerpike, a ruthlessly ambitious kitchen boy, whose rise to power drives the plot of Titus Groan. His escape from the kitchen during the castle's celebration of Lord Titus' birth introduces change into the stultified Gormenghast society. Steerpike is Machiavellian in his rise, but he can also appear charming and sometimes even noble.

== Plot summary ==
The novel begins as the imperious and ritual-driven servant Mr. Flay seeks to inform someone new of the birth of an heir to the House of Groan in a remote part of the sprawling castle of Gormenghast. He relays the information to the curator of the Hall of the Bright Carvings, Mr Rottcodd, notable for being the focal character in the first and last scenes. A son is born to Lord Sepulchrave, Earl of Groan and monarchical ruler of Gormenghast, and his wife, Countess Gertrude. He is named Titus and entrusted to Nannie Slagg by his indifferent mother. Nannie Slagg is an elderly, somewhat senile woman who serves as the nurse and mother figure for the Groan children. She is often unsure of herself, but relishes the small bit of power that comes with raising the heir to the house of Groan. Her first duty is to go to the dwellings of the Bright Carvers just outside the walls of Gormenghast to choose a wet nurse for Titus. Keda, the widow of a well-respected Carver who has recently lost a child from her late husband, volunteers to take on the role. Keda comes to live in the castle for a time helping to raise Titus. Later, she leaves the castle walls and is impregnated by one of her previous two suitors. The suitors promptly kill each other in a duel for her hand in marriage.

On the same day as Titus' birth, an ambitious kitchen boy of seventeen by the name of Steerpike escapes from the kitchens and the obese, sadistic chef, Abiatha Swelter. Lord Sepulchrave's chief servant, Mr. Flay (Swelter's archenemy), comes upon Steerpike who has become lost in the confines of the castle, and takes him through the castle (large parts of which are uninhabited) to a room outside the quarters of the Earl and the Countess. Here, Steerpike takes the opportunity to spy on the Groan family.

Mark Robertson's cover illustration for the Mandarin paperback edition

Despite having led him there, the fiercely loyal Flay is angered by Steerpike's eavesdropping and locks him in a small room. Steerpike, however, escapes out of a window, risking his life above a sheer drop. He manages to climb up onto the roofs and towers of Gormenghast, and from there begins his rise to power.

After spending twenty-four hours clambering over the enormous castle searching for a means to enter, Steerpike manages to climb in through a window into the secret attic of Lady Fuchsia Groan. Fuchsia, who has a great affinity to the large area of long-abandoned attic space she has had all to herself, is at first appalled and outraged by his entry. He senses the importance of her naivety and seizes her attention by putting on an elaborate performance. She is the first of the royal characters on whom Steerpike will use his cunning to exploit.

A while later, Steerpike accompanies Fuchsia to the house of Dr. Prunesquallor, and becomes his apprentice for a while. Dr. Alfred Prunesquallor^{[a]} is the castle's resident physician whom readers have theorised is perhaps based on the actor Ernest Thesiger, although this is unconfirmed. He is an eccentric individual with a high-pitched laugh and a grandiose wit which he uses on the castle's less intelligent inhabitants. Despite his acid tongue, he is an extremely kind and caring man who also is greatly fond of Fuchsia and Titus. He lives with his sister Irma Prunesquallor. Though she is anything but pretty, she is considerably vain. She desperately desires to be admired and loved by men. In this position, Steerpike is able to come into even closer contact with members of the Groan family, in particular Lord Sepulchrave's twin sisters, Cora and Clarice Groan. The sisters are not very bright and are power-hungry and resentful, believing that Countess Gertrude holds the position that they rightfully deserve.

=== Burning of the library ===
Steerpike manages to use the twins' ambition for his own ends. He promises them power and influence, and convinces them that they could achieve their goal by burning down Sepulchrave's beloved library. Steerpike prepares meticulously for the act of arson. He arranges for the burning to happen when the entire Groan family and their most important servants are inside the library for a family gathering (Steerpike intentionally failed to tell the twins that they were invited as well, strengthening their feeling of bitterness towards Sepulchrave and Gertrude). He intends to lock the doors to prevent an escape, and then come through the window and save everyone inside from the fire, appearing as a hero and possibly strengthening his position and granting him more power in the castle.

The plan largely succeeds, resulting in the survival of the entire Groan family –including the Earl and his heir– and all but one of the retainers. However, Sourdust, the Master of Ceremonies, dies of smoke inhalation and the castle library and its entire collection of books are destroyed. The loss devastates Sepulchrave, for whom the library provided refuge from the rigid and repetitive rituals that dominate his life.

Steerpike hoped to become Master of Ritual (a very prestigious job in Gormenghast) after Sourdust died, but the title, like so many things in the castle, is hereditary, and so goes to Sourdust's seventy-four-year-old son Barquentine, who has lived almost completely forgotten in a remote part of the castle for sixty years. He is lame in his one leg, hideous, and unbelievably dirty. Barquentine is a consummate misanthrope who only cares for the laws and traditions of Gormenghast.

During the weeks following the burning, Lord Sepulchrave becomes increasingly insane, starting to believe that he is one of the Death Owls living in the Tower of Flints, the tallest tower in the castle.

=== Flay versus Swelter ===
Flay learns that Swelter intends to kill him. Flay had hit him across the face with a chain before Titus' christening, escalating a mutual loathing into plans for vengeful murder. Flay observes Swelter practising the blow with a large cleaver, and so prepares himself for an attack, acquiring a sword for his protection, in case Swelter should ever attempt to murder him while he is sleeping in front of his master's door.

Things happen differently though: Steerpike, now a full-time retainer of the twins, having quit Doctor Prunesquallor's service, angers Flay by sarcastically imitating Sepulchrave's madness. Flay loses control and hurls one of the countess's white cats at Steerpike. At that moment, the Countess enters the room, and seeing that one of her beloved cats has been abused, immediately banishes Flay from Gormenghast.

Flay is forced to learn how to survive outside the castle, and he sets up various homes in the nearby forest and on Gormenghast Mountain. Having a strong attachment to the castle, and feeling a need to watch over Steerpike and to protect Titus, Flay returns secretly to Gormenghast during the night. Four nights after Titus’ first birthday, Flay finds Swelter wandering the castle with a meat cleaver. Swelter does not know of Flay's banishment, and expects him to be sleeping where he has always slept up until now. Flay follows him to just outside Sepulchrave's door, where Swelter discovers that Flay is not there, and soon realizes that he has been followed. Flay lures Swelter to the Hall of Spiders (making use of the fact that Sepulchrave—who is by now quite insane—is sleepwalking), and there they fight a long duel. Eventually, Flay kills Swelter. Lord Sepulchrave arrives on the scene, and decides that Swelter's body should be taken to the Tower of Flints. After helping Sepulchrave carry the body to the tower, Flay is ordered to stay where he is. The mad Earl babbles about possible reincarnation, bids Flay farewell, and then drags the body into the tower by himself and is attacked and eaten by the starved Death Owls, along with Swelter's remains.

After the disappearance of the Earl and the chief cook (the exiled Flay is not able to tell anyone what has happened), Steerpike leads a search for them. Naturally, their remains are not found, but Steerpike is able to gain a good knowledge of all the rooms in the castle. Flay lives in the mountains, making two caves and a shed for himself—living in seclusion but adept as a naturalist. He later witnesses Keda's suicide as she throws herself off a ledge. Initially just one of a number of minor background characters, Keda's story shows some of the world outside the castle, and her choices, journey and resolution are among the most emotive parts of the story.

=== The Earling ===
Nine days after Sepulchrave's disappearance, Steerpike has a conversation with Barquentine. The Master of Ceremonies tells Steerpike that Titus is now to become Earl of Groan, despite the fact that he is only one year old. He also gives Steerpike the position of his assistant and heir to his post, since Barquentine does not have a child. As the apprentice to the Master of Ceremonies, Steerpike has a good, stable position in the castle, and can now study its inner workings.

Steerpike fears that Cora and Clarice are too careless and may tell others that he convinced them to burn down Sepulchrave's library. Steerpike dresses as Death and convinces the twins they will die if they ever speak of the fire. By this stage, Steerpike has considerable influence in the affairs of Gormenghast, even if he is not yet a recognised figure of authority. He still has to influence people to do his work for him. Despite this, both the Countess and Dr. Prunesquallor are disturbed and uneasy about all that has happened, and disturbed about Steerpike's sudden rise. Yet neither is able to connect Steerpike as the cause of the tragic events, as he was their apparent saviour from the fire in the library.

Soon afterwards, the "Earling" takes place, and young Titus is officially made Earl of Gormenghast. In a ridiculously elaborate ceremony on a nearby lake, little Titus holds aloft the sacred symbols of his status—the stone and ivy branch—and to the horror of observers, promptly drops them both into the lake. The scene is silent except for the shout of Titus and for the shout of Keda's unnamed baby, with a surrogate parent across the lake with the Bright Carvers.

== Characters ==
- Lord Sepulchrave
- Titus Groan
- Countess Gertrude
- Fuchsia Groan
- Cora and Clarice Groan
- Mr Flay
- Abiatha Swelter
- Nannie Slagg
- Barquentine
- Steerpike
- Sourdust
- Dr Alfred Prunesquallor
- Irma Prunesquallor
- Keda

== Other minor characters ==
- Rottcodd: The curator of the Hall of the Bright Carvings and the first character introduced in the series. Rottcodd lives the life of a recluse in the castle, rarely speaking to anyone and, when not dusting the statues at exactly seven o'clock, is usually sleeping in his hammock by the windowside. Flay feels the need to tell someone of the birth of Titus, and chooses Rottcodd, who is so cut off from the life of the castle that he is the only person left who has not heard the news. The book also ends with Rottcodd as he looks out the window at the entire population of the castle returning from Titus' Earling. Everyone had been invited except for him, as he had been forgotten.
- Pentecost: Pentecost was one of the Outer Dwellers once, but worked himself up to become the head gardener of the palace.
- The Poet: Known only by his professional name, the Poet holds a relatively important function of ritual in the castle. He is described as having a wedge-shaped head and a voice "as strange and deep as a lugubrious ocean". He is said to be the only person who can hold Lord Sepulchrave's interest in conversation. Steerpike comes across him on his journey across the rooftops, reciting a poem to himself out of his window. Upon realising that he has been overheard, the Poet wildly over-reacts, and tries to block up his window.
- Rantel and Braigon: Keda's lovers, whose rivalry eventually leads to their death in a nighttime duel.
- Bright Carvers or Mud Dwellers: Hereditary population of the extensive Mud Village situated up against and outside the walls of Gormenghast Castle, who are famed for their skill in woodcarving. Their finest carvings are displayed in the Hall of the Bright Carvings.
- Springers, Spurter and Wrattle: Kitchen boys. Three of Swelter's helpers in the preparation of the Ceremonial Breakfast for Titus.
- Wrenpatch and Flycrake: Kitchen boys. Swelter relishes the prospect of punishing them for arguing with each other, violating Swelter's strict orders for silence.
- Grey Scrubbers: Hereditary cleaners of the Great Kitchen.
- Old Man: Hermit, only known as "Old Man". He cares for Keda as she recovers from the rigours of her travels in the wilds.
- Smelly Old Woman: The Ladies Clarice and Cora's only servant. Used by Steerpike as an example of just how low the status of the Ladies Clarice and Cora has fallen as he draws them into his power.
- Pellet: Servant in the Prunesquallors' household. He is replaced by Steerpike at the instigation of Irma Prunesquallor.
- Shrattle: Armourer. Holds the only key to Groan armoury.

== Adaptations ==
In 1984, BBC Radio 4 broadcast two 90-minute plays based on Titus Groan and Gormenghast, adapted by Brian Sibley and starring Sting as Steerpike and Freddie Jones as the Artist (narrator). A slightly abridged compilation of the two, running to 160 minutes, and entitled Titus Groan of Gormenghast, was broadcast on Christmas Day, 1992. BBC 7 repeated the original versions on 21 and 28 September 2003.

In 2000, the BBC and the PBS station WGBH of Boston produced a miniseries for television, titled Gormenghast, based on the first two books of the trilogy.

In 2011, Brian Sibley adapted the story again, this time as six one-hour episodes broadcast on BBC Radio 4 as the Classic Serial starting on 10 July 2011. The serial was titled The History of Titus Groan and adapted the novels written by Mervyn Peake and the concluding volume, Titus Awakes, written by his widow Maeve Gilmore. It starred Luke Treadaway as Titus, David Warner as the Artist and Carl Prekopp as Steerpike. It also starred Paul Rhys, Miranda Richardson, James Fleet, Tamsin Greig, Fenella Woolgar, Adrian Scarborough and Mark Benton among others.

There have been stage adaptations of Titus Groan, the most recent of which was by theatre company Blackshaw and debuted at the Actors' Church in London's Covent Garden in April 2012.

== Notes ==
^a Prunesquallor's first name is also given as "Bernard" on several occasions in the text. Apparently this was an oversight by Peake.
