= Lady Fuchsia Groan =

- Gormenghast character
- First appearance: Titus Groan
- Last appearance: Gormenghast
- Created by: Mervyn Peake
- Portrayed by: Neve McIntosh

In-universe information
- Gender: Female
- Family: Sepulchrave (father), Gertrude (mother)
- Relatives: Titus Groan (brother), Lady Cora and Lady Clarice Groan (aunts)

Lady Fuchsia Groan is a fictional character in the Gormenghast series of fantasy novels by English writer Mervyn Peake. The daughter of Sepulchrave, 76th Earl of Groan, she appears in the first two volumes in the series, Titus Groan (1946) and Gormenghast (1950). In the BBC film adaptation (2000), Fuchsia is portrayed by Scottish actress Neve McIntosh.

Fuchsia is also the subject of the song "The Drowning Man" by English rock band The Cure, which is about her death and mentions her by name.

== Early life and family ==
The Earl of Groan and his Countess have a daughter, Fuchsia, but only a son can inherit the earldom and the family seat, Gormenghast. Consequently, Fuchsia has been largely ignored by both parents, and she spends most of her time with Nannie Slagg. While Fuchsia cares for Nannie Slagg deeply, she also delights in tormenting the old woman with childish antics and pranks. When Fuchsia is about fifteen, an heir-apparent is finally born. Like many firstborns, Fuchsia is angry that her parents are having another baby and determines to hate her brother or sister. After his naming ceremony, Fuchsia expresses delight that Titus was dropped on his head. Over time, however, the two grow very close. When Titus is twelve, he is imprisoned by his mother and his schoolmaster for repeated questioning and disobedience; and Fuchsia is the only one to visit or talk to him.

== Appearance and personality ==
The novel describes Fuchsia as "a girl of about fifteen with long, rather wild black hair. She was gauche in movement and in a sense ugly of face, but with how small a twist might she not suddenly have become beautiful. Her sullen mouth was full and rich – her eyes smoldered".

Fuchsia is a dreamer and a romantic, who escapes the dull pace of life in Gormenghast by reading fantasy tales. She frequently disappears into her secret attic rooms to fantasize and sulk. She scrawls on walls with charcoal and makes such wild claims as "[W]hen I am Queen, I am going to burn down the castle!", which upsets the aged Nannie Slagg. Lady Fuchsia Groan will never become Queen; but her fantasies of romance and adventure seem to keep her forever young. She responds to everything with childlike enthusiasm; and, beneath her callous and bratty exterior, she is sweet and loving. She loves her father, though she barely knows him; and, during his slow descent into madness, she often says she "cannot bear" to see him this way. She also has an enduring friendship with Dr. Alfred Prunesquallor, the Gormenghast physician. What Fuchsia seems to want most is someone to love her. Actress Neve McIntosh said of the character, "She locks herself in her attic where she lives in her imagination. All she wants is a knight in shining armor to come up to the castle tower and carry her off." Fuchsia's favorite drink is elderberry wine.

== Fuchsia and Steerpike ==
Steerpike takes advantage of Fuchsia's romantic soul by convincing the lonely young woman that he is an adventurer. Fuchsia herself is initially disgusted by Steerpike's grubby appearance, but she is then awed when he tells her of an enigmatic "pavement in the sky". He uses her to quickly find himself work as Dr. Prunesquallor's manservant and dispensary clerk.

Over the course of the novels, Fuchsia falls in love with Steerpike. She is attracted by his swashbuckling persona and by the fact that he is different from anyone else she has ever met. It is possible that Fuchsia also loves what Steerpike represents: the possibility for change. Since Steerpike himself started out as a lowly kitchen boy and advanced upwards through the society of Gormenghast, perhaps it is also possible for Fuchsia to change her own destiny. Unbeknownst to Fuchsia, Steerpike is responsible for the death of her father, an event that saddens the young woman deeply and adds to her feeling of being utterly alone.

Ultimately, the pair's love affair is doomed to fail. Fuchsia finally realizes that Steerpike is "evil" and untrustworthy, and is frightened by his lust for power. While the television series portrays Steerpike as begging Fuchsia for shelter even after he has been revealed as a criminal (a request for assistance that she rejects), there is no corresponding scene in the novel. Fuchsia's death, in chapter 75, is precipitated by "mounting melancholia" brought on by the revelation that she had loved a murderer. This eventually leads her to a situation in which she finds herself standing perilously on a windowsill above the waters that had flooded the castle. Disturbed by someone knocking at the door, she slips and, knocked unconscious by her head striking the windowsill, drowns. While nothing indicates Steerpike's involvement as an immediate cause of her death (he indirectly contributed by disturbing her always fragile mental equilibrium), Titus, upon hearing of her death, immediately blames Steerpike for it (chapter 76) and swears to kill him.

Fuchsia was buried on Gormenghast Mountain, at a site overlooking the castle chosen by her mother, in a ceremony at which neither her brother the Earl, recovering as he was from the severe fever that followed his killing of Steerpike, nor Dr. Prunesquallor, who was caring for the Earl, could attend. It was immediately after a visit to her grave that Titus decided to abandon his hereditary responsibilities and go out into the world.

In Titus Alone, Fuchsia is one of the characters from the earlier novels mocked by Cheeta in the nightmarish scene that she puts on in the Black House (chapter 105).
