= Captain Slaughterboard Drops Anchor =

1939 book by Mervyn Peake

Front cover of the 1977 Academy Edition

Captain Slaughterboard Drops Anchor is a darkly humorous children's picture book written and illustrated by the British author Mervyn Peake and published by Country Life in 1939. It was his first published work.

== Plot ==
The story concerns the nautical exploits of the titular captain and his rambunctious crew aboard their ship The Black Tiger. After some episodic adventures they capture a small humanoid, referred to only as the Yellow Creature, with whom Slaughterboard develops a strange platonic infatuation. His loyal crew gradually fall prey to misadventure and the book ends with the Captain and the Yellow Creature forsaking piracy for fishing on the creature's pink island. The book is notable for Peake's poetic style and his fine illustrations of the many fantastical beasts on the island.

== In other media ==
=== Comics ===
Captain Slaughterboard makes an appearance in the comic book series The League of Extraordinary Gentlemen where The Black Tiger is used as a venue for a pirate conference.
