= The Rhyme of the Flying Bomb =

1947 narrative poem written by Mervyn Peake

"The Rhyme of the Flying Bomb" is a narrative poem written by Mervyn Peake in 1947, and published with his felt-pen illustrations in 1962.

A sailor wandering in London during a World War II air-raid finds a newborn baby in the debris. He takes refuge with the child in an empty church, where it amazes him by levitating and speaking. A dialogue follows between the child, fresh from eternity, and the man mired in the temporal world. At dawn a flying bomb falls on the church, killing them both.

The poem was set to music by Tristram Cary in 1964 in an arrangement for piano, woodwinds, percussion and tape with two spoken parts. It was broadcast by the Australian Broadcasting Commission in 1976 with Barbara West, Alan Hodgson and musicians conducted by the composer.
