= Steerpike =

Character in the Gormenghast novels

- Gormenghast character
- First appearance: Titus Groan (1946)
- Last appearance: Gormenghast (1950)
- Created by: Mervyn Peake
- Portrayed by: Stefan Vinzberg (Opera); Jonathan Rhys Meyers (BBC Series)

In-universe information
- Gender: Male
- Title: Master of Ritual
- Occupation: Kitchen boy, doctor's apprentice, secretary's assistant, secretary

Steerpike is a fictional character in Mervyn Peake's novels Titus Groan and Gormenghast.

== Character ==
Steerpike might be called the antagonist of the Gormenghast trilogy, but in truth he is more of an anti-hero; the first book for example is largely focused on him, only covering the first year of the eponymous hero Titus's life. Steerpike could also be considered an archetypal Machiavellian schemer: a highly intelligent, ruthless character willing to justify any and all means to reach his end. In the books, Peake describes his personality as follows:

if ever he had harboured a conscience in his tough narrow breast he had by now dug out and flung away the awkward thing—flung it so far away that were he ever to need it again he could never find it. High-shouldered to a degree little short of malformation, slender and adroit of limb and frame, his eyes close-set and the colour of dried blood, he is climbing the spiral staircase of the soul of Gormenghast, bound for some pinnacle of the itching fancy—some wild, invulnerable eyrie best known to himself; where he can watch the world spread out below him, and shake exultantly his clotted wings.

And his appearance, as described in Titus Groan:

Limb by limb, it appeared that he was sound enough, but the sum of these several members accrued to an unexpectedly twisted total. His face was pale like clay and save for his eyes, mask-like. These eyes were set very close together, and were small, dark red, and of startling concentration.

== Steerpike's fictional path ==
=== Escape from the kitchen ===
Steerpike first appears as a youth of seventeen years with an unclear past, working in Gormenghast's Great Kitchen under the chef Abiatha Swelter, whom he hates. On the day that Titus, 77th Earl of Gormenghast, is born, Steerpike escapes from the kitchen after Swelter collapses from drink. He is discovered by the chief retainer of the castle, Flay, and locked in a small room. Steerpike escapes through the window and climbs over the vast roofscape of Gormenghast, spending the night in a great stone square, before arriving by accident in the attic of Fuchsia, daughter to the Earl of Gormenghast.

=== The fire ===
Steerpike uses his charm and fast tongue to insinuate himself with the castle's physician Dr Prunesquallor, and acts for a time as his apprentice. From there Steerpike uses the doctor's connections to gain access to the upper hierarchy of Gormenghast. Shortly afterwards he starts to work for the simpleton sisters of the Earl, the twins Cora and Clarice, manipulating them with appeals to their vanity and desire for power (they believed that the Countess had usurped their rightful position beside their brother). He persuades them to set fire to Sepulchrave's Library and uses the circumstances to play the hero in rescuing those trapped inside (including all the surviving members of the House of Groan). Sourdust, the Master of Ritual, dies and Steerpike hopes to take his place, but like so many offices in the castle the position is hereditary and is succeeded by Sourdust's son Barquentine, a crippled and fiercely traditional man.

=== Banishment of Flay ===
The library was Sepulchrave's only joy in life and its loss breaks his spirit, leading to madness and eventual suicide. During this period, Steerpike unintentionally causes the removal of the Earl's manservant, Mr. Flay, who had always been suspicious of him. Steerpike enrages the manservant, who throws one of the Countess's precious white cats at the youth; Flay is subsequently banished. His resultant vendetta against Steerpike becomes a key factor in Steerpike's eventual downfall.

=== The Twins ===
Deciding to remove the twins, Steerpike convinces them to move into a distant and abandoned region of the castle by confabulating an epidemic of "Weasel Plague", which they must be quarantined from. He then explains their disappearance to the inhabitants of the castle with a suicide note (including a confession to arson) and wax models of the Twins (helped by the fact that the half-paralyzed twins were hardly more animated than wax-works in real life).

=== Master of Ritual ===
Steerpike then insinuates himself into Barquentine's work, acting as apprentice and doing his best to make himself indispensable. When he considers the time ripe, he attempts to kill Barquentine by fire, but botches the attempt, underestimating the seemingly frail and disabled old man. Although aflame and dying, Barquentine clings to Steerpike in an attempt to take his murderer with him. Steerpike jumps from the nearest window into the moat below and drowns Barquentine. Steerpike nearly loses his own life in the process, but uses this to his advantage, claiming that the jump into the moat was a desperate attempt to save his master from the fire. The incident, however, leaves Steerpike permanently scarred; his face now red and blotched. The fire and injury also appears to cause changes in his personality, namely a distinct fear of fire and an increasing loss of rationality. The plan succeeds, however, and the death of Barquentine leads to him being appointed Master of Ritual.

=== Discovery ===
At approximately this time the Twins die of starvation in their remote room; locked away they were completely dependent on Steerpike for supplies, but he ceased to visit them when they attempted to kill him and escape. Steerpike of course realizes that they must have died, but it is only after several years as Master of Ritual that he finds time to bother to confirm their deaths (during which time, among other things, he attempts to woo Fuchsia). Unfortunately for him he is followed to their room by Flay, Doctor Prunesquallor, and Titus and is discovered with the corpses. His behaviour at this point shows evident signs of madness, in stark contrast to the cool and rational mastermind he once was.

With his crimes exposed, Steerpike flees and for a short while terrorizes the castle, using his intimate knowledge of its layout and extensive passageways to evade capture. Matters are brought to a head when a huge rainstorm floods the castle, submerging the lower levels and forcing the inhabitants (and Steerpike) higher and higher. Although he evades the Countess's forces, Titus, who blamed Steerpike for his sister's death, eventually finds and kills him.

== Appearances in other media ==
Stefan Vinzberg portrayed the character in the opera adaptation, and he was played by Irish actor Jonathan Rhys Meyers in the BBC miniseries.

Sting played Steerpike in 1984 radio adaption of the first two Gormenghast novels on BBC Radio 4.

== Reception ==
The Daily Telegraph has described Steerpike as one of the greatest villains in English literature. They also proposed that post-war readers were not prepared to fully appreciate the character upon his initial appearance.
