= Titus Awakes =

Unfinished novel in Mervyn Peake's Gormenghast series

Titus Awakes is an early working title applied to a novel planned by Mervyn Peake about 1960, before he became too ill to write. It was to have been the fourth novel in the Gormenghast series, after Titus Groan, Gormenghast, and Titus Alone.

Peake's own version of Titus Awakes is unfinished, as the author died in 1968 without doing any more than starting it. But his widow, Maeve Gilmore, attempted to complete it, and produced two different versions of her interpretation. A reduced version was seen by a reviewer in the 1970s, and what is believed to be her earlier manuscript and notes were edited and published in 2010. So the fourth book exists in three different forms: a few pages of preliminary fragments published in 1992, a never-published manuscript by Gilmore from the 1970s, and an apparently earlier version of Gilmore's book found by her family, edited and published in 2010.

== Versions ==
In the 1970s Peake's widow, Maeve Gilmore, wrote a modified version of Titus Awakes to which she gave the title Search Without End. It runs to 65,000 words, in the typescript that she asked G.P. Winnington to comment on. Watney edited Peake's early fragments as an appendix to Titus Alone.

In 1992 Overlook Press, the American publishers of the Gormenghast series, printed at the end of Titus Alone the few coherent portions of Mervyn Peake's Titus Awakes, with a brief introduction by John Watney. They consist of three pages from which it is clear that although Titus has left the castle, Gormenghast remains active in his memory and important in the story. Although Peake wrote further passages, editors were unable to decipher them.

== Critical reception ==
This unfinished work is not well-known even among readers of Peake's other works, having been published only by Overlook Press (albeit in both single volume and omnibus editions).

Alice Mills comments on the irony of the narrator's comment that "Titus would never again see Gormenghast Castle", since "even in the first proposed chapter, Titus returns in a dream to Gormenghast and the fight between Swelter and Flay". Although it is not entirely clear that the textual repetition is an error, the repetition in the pre-adventure led reviewer Chris Sandow to comment "[t]he fragments are clearly no more than early drafts".

G. Peter Winnington ventures the opinion that Gilmore's manuscript Search Without End that he had been given earlier had been redacted from its original to remove dependence on back-references to the Gormenghast trilogy.

== Continued manuscript ==
Early in 2010 Sebastian Peake announced that his daughter had found Maeve Gilmore's notebook manuscripts of Titus Awakes in the family's attic. Winnington notes that Gilmore's Search Without End version had removed most references to the earlier Gormenghast books, but that they remained in the 2010 Titus Awakes version. It follows Titus's journeys in the wider world and his arrival at the island of Sark, where the Peake family lived from 1946–1949. Finally, after the three Peake children meet the newly-arrived Titus, he metamorphoses into Mervyn Peake. In June 2011, Gilmore's earlier version of book was published by Overlook Press as Titus Awakes: The lost book of Gormenghast, on the 100th anniversary of Mervyn Peake's birth.
