= Frank Sibley (philosopher) =

British philosopher (1923-1996)

Frank Noel Sibley
- Born: Frank Noel Sibley; 1923; England
- Died: 1996 (aged 72–73); London, England

Frank Noel Sibley (28 February 1923, London – 18 February 1996, Lancaster, Lancashire) was a British philosopher who worked mainly in the field of aesthetics. He held the first Chair of Philosophy at Lancaster University. Sibley is best known for his 1959 paper "Aesthetic Concepts" (Philosophical Review, 68), and for "Seeking, Scrutinizing and Seeing" (Mind, 64, 1954). Both papers (and some others) have been anthologized.

Sibley has been considered an important contributor to aesthetics in the analytical tradition. His collected papers, including some posthumous, were published in 2001 as Approach To Aesthetics, together with a companion volume of critical and evaluative essays on his work.

He was the uncle of the writer and broadcaster Brian Sibley.

== Philosophical work ==
=== Aesthetics ===
Most of Sibley's work in aesthetics is collected in Approach to Aesthetics, in which his collected papers were published by Oxford University Press in 2001. He is especially well known for his attempts to distinguish the domains of the aesthetic and non-aesthetic. His 1959 paper "Aesthetic Concepts", which noted that "aesthetic terms have been ... largely neglected" in philosophical discourse, is often referred as one of the landmarks of 20th century aesthetics in the tradition of analytic philosophy. The paper is rich in themes, but the main line of thought suggests that there are aesthetic concepts that possess descriptive content (like 'lifeless,' 'serene,' 'sombre,'dynamic' etc) but that these cannot be sufficiently defined in terms of non-aesthetic concepts because applying these concepts to instances requires the exercise of taste or aesthetic sensibility.

Topics and problems relating to taste thus became very important to Sibley's approach, and he returned to them through his career. Also, Sibley did not see aesthetics as remote from philosophy as whole. This is very clear from his brief programmatic note "About Taste", published in 1966 in British Journal of Aesthetics. Here Sibley states the situation thus:

"The programme that aestheticians must face is thus a large one, the charting of a huge areas neglected by other philosophers working within their customary bonds. Indeed, far from its being true that aesthetics is peripheral to philosophy, aestheticians encounter ranges of concepts wider than and inevitably including of those studied by most other branches of philosophy."

=== Philosophy of mind ===
Beside aesthetics, Sibley worked on the philosophy of perception and the philosophy of mind. His first published paper was a long review of Gilbert Ryle's Concept of Mind in 1950. Later he contributed another piece on Ryle, "Ryle and Thinking", to Ryle: Collection of Essays.

He wrote two papers on the theory of perception, and some papers on the borderline of that field and aesthetics, one paper on colours, and a little piece on applied philosophy. One posthumous paper deals extensively with a certain distinction made by Peter Geach. Other than these, his work was in aesthetics.

== Selected publications ==
- Frank Sibley (1954) "Seeking, Scrutinizing and Seeing" Mind, 64. Also in Geoffrey Warnock (ed.) (1967) The Philosophy of Perception. Oxford.
- "Aesthetic Concepts", Philosophical Review 68 (1959), pp. 421–50, also anthologised multiple times.
- "Aesthetic and Non-Aesthetic", Philosophical Review, 84 (1965), 135–59
- "Objectivity and Aesthetics", Aristotelian Society, supp. XLII (1968), 31–54
- Frank Sibley (2001) Approach To Aesthetics. Collected Papers On Philosophical Aesthetics, Edited by J. Benson et al., Oxford.
