= Letters from a Lost Uncle =

1948 book by Mervyn Peake

- First edition (published by Eyre & Spottiswoode)
- Author: Mervyn Peake
- Language: English
- Publication date: 1948

Written for children, Letters from a Lost Uncle by Mervyn Peake is a combination of pencil drawing and typed manuscript. It is written in the form of letters from a lost uncle who is travelling in distant polar regions in search of a white lion. He has a spike for a leg, and is accompanied by his retainer, Jackson, a bizarre turtle figure.

Originally published in 1948, the book was well-received but Peake complained about the war-time quality of the paper on which it was printed and it was subsequently withdrawn. It was reissued in 1976 and is now published by Methuen.
