= Barquentine (Gormenghast) =

- Gormenghast character
- First appearance: Titus Groan
- Created by: Mervyn Peake

In-universe information
- Gender: Male
- Title: Master of Ritual
- Family: Sourdust (father)

Barquentine is a fictional character in Mervyn Peake's Gormenghast series. He is the son of Sourdust, the Master of Ritual of Gormenghast Castle. He is a one-legged, hunchbacked dwarf with a bitter, vicious personality; he never washes, he dresses in filthy rags, and his hair and beard are long, tangled and dirty. He is frequently taunted by the castle's children, who sing "Rotten leg, rotten spine – ya! ya! Barquentine!"

When he appears in the first book, Barquentine is 74 years old, and lives a hermitic existence in an obscure tract of the castle. He takes on the hereditary office of Master of Ritual following the death of his father, and accepts Steerpike as his assistant. In the second book, Gormenghast, he is murdered by Steerpike, who takes over the post of Master of Ritual.
