= Titus Alone =

1959 novel written by Mervyn Peake

- First 1959 edition cover
- Author: Mervyn Peake
- Cover artist: Mervyn Peake
- Language: English
- Series: Gormenghast
- Genre: Gothic
- Publisher: Eyre & Spottiswoode
- Publication date: 1959
- Publication place: United Kingdom
- Media type: Print (hardback & paperback)
- Dewey Decimal: 823.914
- Preceded by: Boy in Darkness
- Followed by: Titus Awakes

Titus Alone is a novel written by Mervyn Peake and first published in 1959. It is the third work in the Gormenghast trilogy. The other works are Titus Groan and Gormenghast. With the trilogy, a fourth work, the novella Boy in Darkness, and a fifth, the fragment Titus Awakes, are often considered part of a larger "Gormenghast series". It was re-edited by Langdon Jones in 1970 using the original manuscript.

In this novel, Titus has left the Medieval castle where he was raised and explores strange areas of his native world. He finds himself wandering in a modern city with skyscrapers and flying machines. After a brief romantic relationship with an older woman, Titus discovers a hidden area of tunnels and halls beneath the city's only river. It is populated by the city's outcasts, runaways and derelicts.

== Plot summary ==
The story follows Titus as he journeys through the world outside Gormenghast Castle, having left his home at the end of the second book.

=== Muzzlehatch and the city ===
Titus bumbles through a desert for a time, then uses a canoe to row down the river, where the reader gets a surprise: although Gormenghast is a crumbling, medieval castle, Titus finds himself in a modern city. Skyscrapers tower and the river itself is covered in pipes, canals and fishermen.

As Titus slips the painter on the canoe, he has his first encounter with two faceless, silent persons, ostensibly police officers. Titus is exhausted by this stage and collapses on the city's waterfront, where he is rescued by a man named Muzzlehatch, who runs a zoo and drives a shark-shaped car. When Titus has recovered, he becomes restless and leaves Muzzlehatch's home to explore the city.

Titus comes upon various huge glass and steel buildings, and arrives at a vast circular plaza of grey marble, which he begins to cross. At the far side of the plaza is a kind of airfield where brightly coloured flying machines land and take off. One of the flying machines starts to pursue Titus and he crosses the plaza hurriedly and runs into a large building to escape. He climbs to the top of the building and observes through a skylight that a party is taking place.

Titus watches the party, overhearing various strange and disjointed conversations, until by accident he breaks the skylight, and falls through onto the ground. Titus only avoids arrest at this stage because he is lucky enough to have landed at the feet of Juno, who is Muzzlehatch's ex-lover. Juno and Muzzlehatch (who is also at the party) hide Titus until the police are gone. Nevertheless Titus is later arrested anyway, and brought to trial before a magistrate. He only avoids being sent to an institution for offenders by Juno agreeing to be his guardian and taking him in to live with her.

Mark Robertson's cover illustration for the Mandarin paperback edition

=== Juno and the Under-River ===
Titus then goes to stay with Juno, who lives by herself in a beautiful mansion. Although she is at least twice his age, after a short while they become lovers. There follows a blissful period when the two lovers live together joyfully, but Titus again becomes restless and decides to leave Juno. He parts from Juno and heads out once more to explore the city, where he is followed by a mysterious floating orb, which appears to have an intelligence of its own. Titus becomes frightened and angry towards the grey, translucent orb, and flings his Gormenghast flint (his only token of home) at it, smashing the orb into pieces. He then flees to Muzzlehatch's house. Muzzlehatch informs Titus that the scientists are furious because of the destruction of their orb – their greatest achievement – and that Titus's life is now in danger. He gives Titus directions to the hidden world of the Under-River and urges Titus to flee there.

The Under-River is a hidden region of tunnels and halls under the city's river, filled with outcasts, runaways and derelicts. When he gets there, Titus has an encounter with an ex-prison camp warden called Veil, who is abusing a woman companion, an ex-prisoner called the Black Rose. Titus and Veil start to fight over the Black Rose, and Titus is about to be killed when Muzzlehatch appears and kills Veil. Muzzlehatch reveals that the scientists have killed all the animals in his zoo, using some sort of death ray. Muzzlehatch and Titus then bring the Black Rose out of the Under-River region to Juno's house to recover from her abuse. Titus then flees the city, and Muzzlehatch also leaves, seeking revenge on the scientists. Despite their efforts, the Black Rose dies as soon as they are gone, and Juno is forced to provide an excuse to the city authorities for her presence. After she has dealt with this, Juno then encounters a red-haired man at the bottom of her garden, who tells her that he has been living in the woods beside Juno's house, watching and waiting for her for a long time. Despite him being a stalker of some kind, Juno takes up with the mysterious man, whom she decides to call "Anchor" (he will not tell her his real name). They leave Juno's house and the city together in Anchor's car, in search of adventure.

=== Cheeta and the factory ===
Titus resumes his wanderings and is eventually found in a state of fever by a woman named Cheeta, who nurses him back to health. While he is in a fever Titus continually talks about his past, and as a result, Cheeta learns all about Gormenghast by listening to him. When he has recovered, Titus becomes infatuated with Cheeta, who is very beautiful and also very rich. Cheeta is described as a "modern girl" with "a new kind of beauty", who flies a helicopter. Titus lusts for her because he has spent all his life in a straitlaced medieval castle, and Cheeta lives like science incarnate. She is the daughter of a scientist who runs a huge modern factory next to a lake. When Titus first sees the factory from a distance it looks sleek and impressive, but as he gets closer he notices that it gives off a strange unnerving hum, and a sickly sweet smell of death. As he first looks closely at the factory he notices an identical face looking at him from every window, and when a whistle blows they all instantly disappear. He is repulsed by the factory and begins to feel uneasy about Cheeta.

Although Titus lusts for Cheeta, he also tells her several times that he hates her and tells her to "go home to your horde of vestal virgins and forget me as I shall forget you". Cheeta is shocked because other men would give anything for her favour. She contrives an elaborate plan to lure him into the "Black House", to see "a hundred bright inventions", and end their relationship on a high note. There, she attempts to recreate Gormenghast horrendously in order to humiliate Titus and drive him insane, but she is foiled by Muzzlehatch. Muzzlehatch has arrived at the Black House in order to confront Cheeta's father, the scientist, for his role in the murder of his animals. He reveals that he has sabotaged Cheeta's father's factory, and a few moments later it is destroyed in a huge explosion that rocks the Black House and covers the sky in a filthy orange cloud. Muzzlehatch is then killed by the helmeteers (see below), who are in turn killed by Anchor and the trio from the Under-River (also see below). Muzzlehatch decides it is not worth killing Cheeta's father, and he and his daughter flee. Titus also flees in an aircraft with Anchor and Juno. After flying for a while, Titus jumps out of the aircraft with a parachute and lands near a large rock that he knew from his childhood. Hearing the guns of Gormenghast saluting the missing Earl, he is confirmed in his knowledge that he is not insane and that the Castle exists. Tempted to return to his duties, he nevertheless confirms his desire for independence and once again strikes off alone, this time in a different direction.

== Other minor characters ==
Helmeteers: Two soldiers or police officers who pursue Titus relentlessly throughout the book. They both wear uniforms and plumed helmets and carry scrolls of parchments in their hands. Not only do they look identical, but their every movement and posture is made simultaneously and in the same way.

Crabcalf, Slingshott and Crack-Bell: Inhabitants of the Under-River region of tunnels and halls under the city's river, where refugees from various prison camps and persecutions gather to evade capture. Crabcalf is a failed author who lives surrounded by the unsold copies of his only published work, a book of poetry. Slingshott is a survivor of a saltmine. They leave the Under-River and go in search of Titus, after hearing of his fight with Veil.

Veil: An ex-prison warden who lives in the Under-River region, with his companion the Black Rose. He is an evil and aggressive character who abuses the Black Rose. He fights Titus and is about to kill him, when he is in turn killed by Muzzlehatch.

The Black Rose: An ex-inmate of some kind of prison camp, who lives in the Under-River region with Veil. She escaped from the camp by agreeing to become Veil's companion, but in exchange is forced to live as a different kind of prisoner, being abused and maltreated by Veil.

The Scientist: Cheeta's father, who runs the mysterious and sinister factory. Despite being softly-spoken, grey and non-descript in appearance, the Scientist is some kind of evil genius who is conducting Frankenstein-like experiments in the factory, and appears to be leader of the scientists who control the city.

== Themes and motifs ==
A main theme in the book is the search for "I Am"-ness, the relationship between Memory, Time and Personality. One possible theme is ancients versus moderns, a theme that has existed since the time of Swift. Titus only wants Cheeta because she is a modern girl surrounded by dazzling technology, and her father is an innovative scientist who runs a mass-production factory, and he has spent all his life in a mouldy, antiquated castle run by tradition. But after having a long affair with Cheeta, he seems to realise she is self-centered and cruel, and rejects her.

Cheeta becomes treacherous and vengeful, and uses her technology and resources to hideously recreate Gormenghast, and she thinks nothing of it. Furthermore, even though her factory is efficient, sleek and modern, there are indications that it may be an allegory for the Nazi concentration camps Peake encountered during his service in the Second World War.

Further references to a police state and concentration camps are found in the backstory of the Black Rose. The most the scientists manage to accomplish is to ruin Muzzlehatch's future by using a death ray to burn his zoo. As David Louis Edelman notes, the prescient Steerpike never seems to be able to accomplish much either, except to drive Titus' father mad by burning his library. The general theme, therefore, would seem to be that the false allure of the future is as dangerous and stupid as the false allure of the past.

== Critical reception ==
The first edition contains many changes wrought by a heavy-handed editor, including the omission of entire chapters. The editor also removed various references to modern technology such as helicopters and cars. Critical reception has been more mixed since the complete novel was published.
