= Mervyn Peake =

British author and illustrator (1911–1968)

- Peake in the 1930s
- Born: Mervyn Laurence Peake; 9 July 1911; Kuling, Jiujiang, Qing China
- Died: 17 November 1968 (aged 57); Burcot, Oxfordshire, England
- Education: Eltham College; Croydon School of Art; Royal Academy Schools
- Occupations: Writer, artist, poet, illustrator
- Notable work: Gormenghast series
- Spouse: Maeve Gilmore
- Children: 3
- Relatives: Jack Peñate (grandson)

Mervyn Laurence Peake (9 July 1911 – 17 November 1968) was a British writer, artist, poet, and illustrator. He is best known for what are usually referred to as the Gormenghast books. The four works were part of what Peake conceived as a lengthy cycle, the completion of which was prevented by his death. They are sometimes compared to the work of his older contemporary J. R. R. Tolkien, but Peake's surreal fiction was influenced by his early love for Charles Dickens and Robert Louis Stevenson rather than Tolkien's studies of mythology and philology.

Peake also wrote poetry and literary nonsense in verse form, short stories for adults and children (Letters from a Lost Uncle, 1948), stage and radio plays, and Mr Pye (1953), a relatively tightly structured novel in which God implicitly mocks the evangelical pretensions and cosy world-view of the eponymous hero.

Peake first made his reputation as a painter and illustrator during the 1930s and 1940s, when he lived in London, and he was commissioned to produce portraits of well-known people. For a short time at the end of World War II he was commissioned by various newspapers to depict war scenes. A collection of his drawings is still in the possession of his family. Although he gained little popular success in his lifetime, his work was highly respected by his peers, and his friends included C. S. Lewis, Dylan Thomas and Graham Greene. His works are now included in the collections of the National Portrait Gallery, the Imperial War Museum and The National Archives.

In 2008, The Times named Peake among their list of "The 50 greatest British writers since 1945".

== Early life ==
Mervyn Peake was born of British parents in Kuling located on top of Mount Lu in Jiujiang in 1911, only three months before the revolution and the founding of the Republic of China. His father, Ernest Cromwell Peake, was a medical missionary doctor with the London Missionary Society of the Congregationalist tradition, and his mother, Amanda Elizabeth Powell, had come to China as a missionary assistant. Ernest and Amanda met in July 1903 at Kuling (from the English word "cooling"), a summer European missionary resort in Mount Lu about the Yangtze River in Jiujiang. They got married in Hong Kong in December of that same year.

The Peakes were given leave to visit England just before World War I in 1914 and returned to China in 1916. Mervyn Peake attended Tientsin Grammar School until the family left for England in December 1922 via the Trans-Siberian Railway. He would later write a novella about this time, titled The White Chief of the Umzimbooboo Kaffirs. Peake never returned to China but it has been noted that Chinese influences can be detected in his works, not least in the castle of Gormenghast itself, which in some respects echoes his birthplace Kuling, as well as the ancient walled city of Beijing and the enclosed compound where he grew up in Tianjin. It is also likely that his early exposure to the contrasts between the lives of the Europeans and of the Chinese, and between the poor and the wealthy in China, also exerted an influence on the Gormenghast books.

His education continued at Eltham College, Mottingham (1923–1929), where his talents were encouraged by his English teacher, Eric Drake. Peake completed his formal education at Croydon School of Art in the autumn of 1929, and then from December 1929 to 1933 at the Royal Academy Schools, where he first painted in oils. By this time, he had written his first long poem, A Touch o' the Ash. In 1931, he had a painting accepted for display by the Royal Academy and exhibited his work with the so-called "Soho Group".

== Career ==
His early career in the 1930s was as a painter in London, although he lived on the Channel Island of Sark for a time. He first moved to Sark in 1932 where his former teacher Eric Drake was setting up an artists' colony. In 1934, Peake exhibited with the Sark artists both in the Sark Gallery built by Drake and at the Cooling Galleries in London, and in 1935 he exhibited at the Royal Academy and at the Leger Galleries in London.

In 1936, he returned to London and was commissioned to design the sets and costumes for The Insect Play, and his work was acclaimed in The Sunday Times. He also began teaching life drawing at Westminster School of Art where he met the painter Maeve Gilmore, whom he married in 1937. They had three children: Sebastian (1940–2012), Fabian (born 1942), and Clare (born 1949).

Peake had a very successful exhibition of paintings at the Calmann Gallery in London in 1938 and his first book, the self-illustrated children's pirate romance Captain Slaughterboard Drops Anchor (based on a story he had written around 1936), was first published in 1939 by Country Life. In December 1939, he was commissioned by Chatto & Windus to illustrate a children's book, Ride a Cock Horse and Other Nursery Rhymes, published for the Christmas market in 1940.

=== Enlistment ===
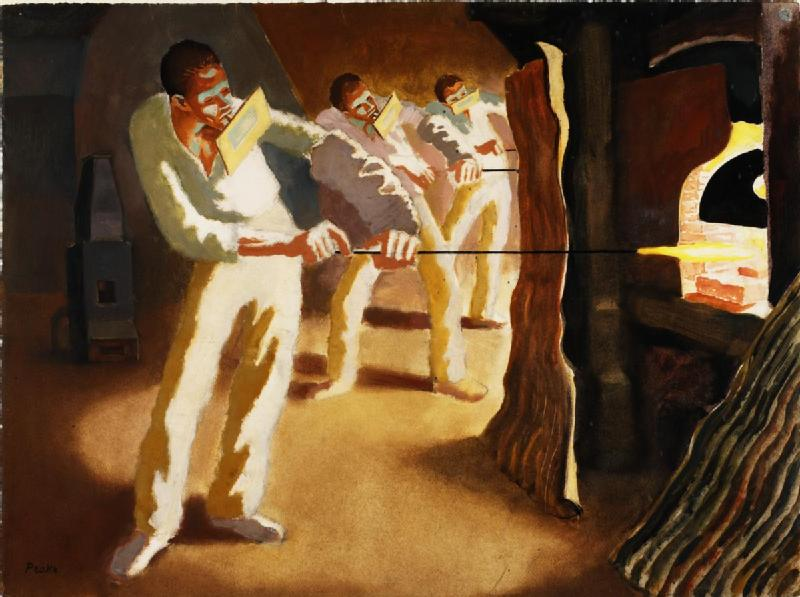
Glass-blowers "Gathering" from the Furnace (1943) (Art.IWM ART LD 2851)

At the outbreak of World War II, he applied to become a war artist, for he was keen to put his skills at the service of his country. He imagined An Exhibition by the Artist, Adolf Hitler, in which horrific images of war with ironic titles were offered as "artworks" by the Nazi leader. Although the drawings were bought by the British Ministry of Information, Peake's application was turned down and he was conscripted into the Army, where he served first with the Royal Artillery, then with the Royal Engineers. He began writing Titus Groan at this time.

In April 1942, after his requests for commissions as a war artist – or even leave to depict war damage in London – had been consistently refused, he suffered a nervous breakdown and was sent to Southport Hospital. That autumn he was taken on as a graphic artist by the Ministry of Information for a period of six months to work on propaganda illustrations. The next spring he was invalided out of the Army. In 1943 he was commissioned by the War Artists' Advisory Committee, WAAC, to paint glassblowers at the Chance Brothers factory in Smethwick where cathode ray tubes for early radar sets were being produced. Peake was next given a full-time, three-month WAAC contract to depict various factory subjects and was also asked to submit a large painting showing RAF pilots being debriefed. Some of these paintings are on permanent display in Manchester Art Gallery, while other examples are in the Imperial War Museum collection.

=== Illustration and writing ===
The five years between 1943 and 1948 were some of the most productive of his career. He finished Titus Groan and Gormenghast and completed some of his most acclaimed illustrations for books by other authors, including Lewis Carroll's The Hunting of the Snark (for which he was reportedly paid only £5) and Alice in Wonderland, Samuel Taylor Coleridge's The Rime of the Ancient Mariner, the Brothers Grimm's Household Tales, All This and Bevin Too by Quentin Crisp and Robert Louis Stevenson's Strange Case of Dr Jekyll and Mr Hyde, as well as producing many original poems, drawings, and paintings.

Peake designed the logo for Pan Books. The publishers offered him either a flat fee of £10 or a royalty of one farthing per book. On the advice of Graham Greene, who told him that paperback books were a passing fad that would not last, Peake opted for the £10.

A book of nonsense poems, Rhymes Without Reason, was published in 1944 and was described by John Betjeman as "outstanding". Shortly after the war ended in 1945, Edgar Ainsworth, the art editor of Picture Post, commissioned Peake to visit France and Germany for the magazine. With writer Tom Pocock, Peake was among the first British civilians to witness the horrors of the Nazi concentration camp at Belsen, where the remaining prisoners, too sick to be moved, were dying before his very eyes. He made several drawings, but not surprisingly he found the experience profoundly harrowing, and expressed in deeply felt poems the ambiguity of turning their suffering into art.

In 1946, the family moved to Sark, where Peake continued to write and illustrate, and Maeve painted. Gormenghast was published in 1950, and the family moved back to England, settling in Smarden, Kent. Peake taught part-time at the Central School of Art, began his comic novel Mr Pye, and renewed his interest in theatre. His father died that year and left his house in Hillside Gardens in Wallington, Surrey to Peake. Mr Pye was published in 1953, and he later adapted it as a radio play. The BBC broadcast other plays of his in 1954 and 1956.

== Later life ==
In 1956, Mervyn and Maeve visited Spain, financed by a friend who hoped that Peake's health, which was already declining, would be improved by the holiday. That year his novella Boy in Darkness was published beside stories by William Golding and John Wyndham in a volume called Sometime, Never. On 18 December the BBC broadcast his radio play The Eye of the Beholder (later revised as The Voice of One), in which an avant-garde artist is commissioned to paint a church mural. Peake placed much hope in his play The Wit to Woo, which was finally staged in London's West End in 1957, but it was a critical and commercial failure. This affected him greatly – his health degenerated rapidly and he was again admitted to hospital with a nervous breakdown. During this period he was published primarily in New Worlds by Michael Moorcock, a consistent supporter since the mid-1950s.

=== Declining health ===
He was showing unmistakable early symptoms of dementia, for which he was given electroconvulsive therapy, to little avail. Over the next few years he gradually lost the ability to draw steadily and quickly, although he still managed to produce some drawings with the help of his wife. Among his last completed works were the illustrations for Balzac's Droll Stories (1961) and for his own poem The Rhyme of the Flying Bomb (1962), which he had written some 15 years earlier.

Titus Alone was published in 1959 and was revised in 1970 by Langdon Jones, an editor of New Worlds, to remove apparent inconsistencies introduced by the publisher's careless editing. Jones, also a composer, set The Rhyme of the Flying Bomb to music. A 1995 edition of all three completed Gormenghast novels includes a very short fragment of the beginning of what would have been the fourth Gormenghast novel, Titus Awakes, as well as a listing of events and themes he wanted to address in that and later Gormenghast novels.

== Death ==
Throughout the 1960s, Peake's health declined into physical and mental incapacitation, and he died on 17 November 1968 at a care home run by his brother-in-law, at Burcot, near Oxford. He was buried in the churchyard of St Mary's in the village of Burpham, West Sussex.

A 2003 study published in JAMA Neurology assessed that Peake's death was the result of dementia with Lewy bodies (DLB).

His work, especially the Gormenghast series, became much better known and more widely appreciated after his death. They have since been translated into more than two dozen languages.

== Publications ==
Six volumes of Peake's verse were published during his lifetime: Shapes & Sounds (1941), Rhymes without Reason (1944), The Glassblowers (1950), The Rhyme of the Flying Bomb (1962), Poems & Drawings (1965), and A Reverie of Bone (1967). After his death came Selected Poems (1972), followed by Peake's Progress in 1979 – though the Penguin edition of 1982, with many corrections, including a whole stanza inadvertently omitted from the hardback edition. The Collected Poems of Mervyn Peake was published by Carcanet Press in June 2008. Other collections include The Drawings of Mervyn Peake (1974), Writings and Drawings (1974), and Mervyn Peake: The Man and His Art (2006). A limited edition of the collected works, issued to celebrate Peake's centenary year, was published by Queen Anne Press.

== Archive ==
In 2010 an archive consisting of 28 containers of material, which included correspondence between Peake and Laurie Lee, Walter de la Mare and C. S. Lewis, plus 39 Gormenghast notebooks and original drawings for both Alice Through the Looking Glass and Alice's Adventures in Wonderland, was acquired by the British Library. Access to the Archive is available through the British Library website. In July 2020, the British Library acquired from the Peake Estate a visual archive consisting of 300 of Peake's original illustrations for children's stories, Gormenghast, and other works including Treasure Island.

== Commemoration ==
Peake's three children presented on BBC Radio Four in 2018 a half-hour memoir of their father's life, emphasizing the importance of the island of Sark.

The first blue plaque on Sark was unveiled in Peake's honour at the Gallery Stores in the Avenue on 30 August 2019.

== Dramatic adaptations of Peake's work ==
In 1983, the Australian Broadcasting Corporation broadcast eight hour-long episodes for radio dramatising the complete Gormenghast Trilogy. This was the first to include the third book Titus Alone.

In 1984, BBC Radio 4 broadcast two 90-minute plays based on Titus Groan and Gormenghast, adapted by Brian Sibley and starring Sting as Steerpike and Freddie Jones as the Artist (narrator). A slightly abridged compilation of the two, running to 160 minutes, and entitled Titus Groan of Gormenghast, was broadcast on Christmas Day, 1992. BBC 7 repeated the original versions on 21 and 28 September 2003.

In 1986, Mr Pye was adapted as a four-part Channel 4 miniseries starring Derek Jacobi.

In 2000, the BBC and WGBH Boston co-produced a lavish miniseries, titled Gormenghast, based on the first two books of the series. It starred Jonathan Rhys-Meyers as Steerpike, Neve McIntosh as Fuchsia, June Brown as Nannie Slagg, Ian Richardson as Lord Groan, Christopher Lee as Flay, Richard Griffiths as Swelter, Warren Mitchell as Barquentine, Celia Imrie as Countess Gertrude, Lynsey Baxter and Zoë Wanamaker as the twins Cora and Clarice, and John Sessions as Dr Prunesquallor. The supporting cast included Olga Sosnovska, Stephen Fry and Eric Sykes, and the series is also notable as the last screen performance by comedy legend Spike Milligan (as the Headmaster).

A 30-minute TV short film entitled A Boy in Darkness (also made in 2000 and adapted from Peake's novella) was the first production from the BBC Drama Lab. It was set in a "virtual" computer-generated world created by young computer game designers, and starred Jack Ryder (from EastEnders) as Titus, with Terry Jones (Monty Python's Flying Circus) narrating.

Irmin Schmidt, founder of seminal German Krautrock group Can, wrote an opera called Gormenghast, based on the novels; it was first performed in Wuppertal, Germany, in November 1998. A number of early songs by New Zealand rock group Split Enz were inspired by Peake's work. The song "The Drowning Man", by British band The Cure, is inspired by events in Gormenghast, and the song "Lady Fuchsia" by another British band, Strawbs, is also based on events in the novels.

Peake's play The Cave, which dates from the mid-1950s, was given a first public reading at the Blue Elephant Theatre in Camberwell (London) in 2009, and had its world premiere in the same theatre, directed by Aaron Paterson, on 19 October 2010.

In 2011, Brian Sibley adapted the story again, this time as six one-hour episodes broadcast on BBC Radio 4 as the Classic Serial starting on 10 July 2011. The serial was titled The History of Titus Groan and adapted all three novels written by Mervyn Peake and the recently discovered concluding volume, Titus Awakes, completed by his widow, Maeve Gilmore. It starred Luke Treadaway as Titus, David Warner as the Artist and Carl Prekopp as Steerpike. It also starred Paul Rhys, Miranda Richardson, James Fleet, Tamsin Greig, Fenella Woolgar, Adrian Scarborough and Mark Benton among others.

Sting owned the film rights to the Gormenghast novels for a brief period in the 1980s, during which he discussed the possibility of adapting the novels into a series of concept albums, but he abandoned the idea after declaring the Radio 4 audio drama as ideal. As of 2015, author Neil Gaiman was in talks to adapt the novels for the big screen.

== Legacy ==
Authors who have cited Peake as influences on their work include: Neil Gaiman, Joanne Harris, Simon Maginn, Christopher Fowler and Susanna Clarke.

Peake is considered to be one of the Big Three of (secondary world) Fantasy, along with J. R. R. Tolkien and Robert E. Howard. Their equivalents in the science fiction genre are Isaac Asimov, Arthur C. Clarke, and Robert A. Heinlein.

== Bibliography ==
Gormenghast

1. Titus Groan (1946)
2. Gormenghast (1950)
2.5. Boy in Darkness (corrupt text 1956, corrected text 2007)
3. Titus Alone (1959)
4. Titus Awakes (2011, completed by Maeve Gilmore)

Boy in Darkness and Other Stories (2007, the correct text and five other pieces)

Other works

- The White Chief of the Unzimbooboo Kaffirs (1921)
- Captain Slaughterboard Drops Anchor (1939)
- Shapes and Sounds (1941)
- Rhymes without Reason (1944)
- The Craft of the Lead Pencil (1946)
- Letters from a Lost Uncle (from Polar Regions) (1948)
- Drawings by Mervyn Peake (1949)
- The Glassblowers (1950)
- Mr Pye (1953)
- Figures of Speech (1954)
- The Rhyme of the Flying Bomb (1962)
- Poems and Drawings (1965)
- A Reverie of Bone and other Poems (1967)
- Selected Poems (1972)
- A Book of Nonsense (1972)
- The Drawings of Mervyn Peake (1974)
- Mervyn Peake: Writings and Drawings (1974)
- Twelve Poems (1975)
- Peake's Progress (1978)
- Ten Poems (1993)
- Eleven Poems (1995)
- The Cave (1996)
- Collected Poems (2008)

=== Illustrated books ===
- Captain Slaughterboard Drops Anchor (by himself) (Country Life, 1939)
- Ride a Cock Horse and Other Nursery Rhymes (Chatto & Windus, 1940)
- The Adventures of The Young Soldier in Search of The Better World (by C. E. M. Joad) (Faber and Faber Ltd, 1943)
- The Book of Lyonne (by Burgess Drake) (The Falcon Press, 1952)
- Hunting of the Snark (by Lewis Carroll)
- Alice in Wonderland (by Lewis Carroll)
- The Rime of the Ancient Mariner (by Samuel Taylor Coleridge)
- Household Tales (by the Brothers Grimm)
- All This and Bevin Too (by Quentin Crisp)
- Dr Jekyll and Mr Hyde (by Robert Louis Stevenson)
- Treasure Island (by Robert Louis Stevenson)
- Droll Stories (by Balzac) (Folio Society, 1961)
- The Rhyme of the Flying Bomb (by himself) (1962)
- Titus Groan, Gormenghast, and Titus Alone (by himself; several editions include an abundance of illustrations, on plates in the center and/or distributed through the text)
- The Swiss Family Robinson (by Johann David Wyss)
- The Sunday Books (with Michael Moorcock) (Duckworth, 2008, from the French)
