= Gormenghast (novel) =

1950 fantasy novel by Mervyn Peake

- First edition cover – 1950
- Author: Mervyn Peake
- Cover artist: Mervyn Peake
- Language: English
- Series: Gormenghast
- Genre: Gothic, fantasy novel
- Publisher: Eyre & Spottiswoode
- Publication date: 1950
- Publication place: United Kingdom
- Media type: Print (hardback & paperback)
- Dewey Decimal: 823.914
- Preceded by: Titus Groan
- Followed by: Titus Alone

Gormenghast /ˈɡɔːmənˌɡɑːst/ is a fantasy novel by British writer Mervyn Peake, the second in his Gormenghast series. It is the story of Titus Groan, 77th Earl of Groan and Lord of Gormenghast Castle, from age 7 to 17. As the story opens, Titus dreads the pre-ordained life of ritual that stretches before him. To Titus, Master of Ritual Barquentine and his apprentice Steerpike are the embodiment of all he wants to rebel against. An important sub-plot involves Titus at school, where he encounters the professors, especially Bellgrove, who becomes Headmaster of Gormenghast school.

== Plot summary ==
=== Steerpike usurps Barquentine ===
Steerpike, despite his position of authority, is in reality a dangerous traitor to Gormenghast who seeks to eventually wield ultimate power in the castle. To this end, he kills Barquentine so that he can replace him and so advance in power. Although he is successful in his murder of Barquentine, the old master of ritual put up such a severe struggle that Steerpike is severely injured in the process, suffering extensive burns and almost drowning. As Steerpike lies recovering in a delirious state from his ordeal, he cries out the words And the twins will make it five.

His words are overheard by the castle's doctor, Dr Prunesquallor, who is greatly disturbed to hear them. Although the reader is not told this explicitly, Steerpike's words are a clear reference to the number of people he has killed. The reference to the twins is to the aunts of Titus, the twin sisters Ladies Cora and Clarice. Steerpike has effectively been holding them captive in a remote and abandoned part of the castle, and they are utterly dependent on him for food and drink. Due to Steerpike's prolonged recovery he is unable to supply them (and at some level Steerpike is aware of this, even in his delirium), and by the time he has recovered he believes them to have probably already died of thirst and starvation, though in fact they die a few days later.

Dr Prunesquallor discusses Steerpike's words with the Countess Gertrude, but they disagree over its meaning and the ambiguity over exactly what Steerpike meant is never resolved. Nevertheless, both of them are now thoroughly suspicious about Steerpike and his role in the various disappearances and deaths among the happenings of the castle. Although Steerpike appears to make a full recovery, he is left disfigured with a morbid fear of fire. It also becomes clear that the balance of his mind is increasingly disturbed.

=== The professors ===
An important part of Titus' life is spent at school, where he encounters the school professors, especially Bellgrove, one of Titus's teachers, who eventually ascends to Headmaster of Gormenghast. The other teachers are a collection of misfits, each with idiosyncrasies of their own, who bicker and compete with each other in petty rivalries, being not unlike a bunch of overgrown schoolboys themselves. A welcome humorous interlude in the novel occurs when Irma Prunesquallor (sister of the castle's doctor) decides to get married, and throws a party in the hope of meeting a suitable partner. To this end she invites the school professors, who are so terrified of meeting a woman that they make fools of themselves in various ways. One professor faints at the prospect of having to speak to Irma and has to be revived by the doctor. When he wakes up he flees naked and shrieking over the garden wall, never to be seen again. Only Bellgrove, recently made headmaster, rises to the occasion and behaves in a gentlemanly way to Irma. Bellgrove and Irma thus begin a rather unusual romance. Bellgrove becomes an important figure in Titus' development. In many respects, he is the standard absent-minded professor who falls asleep during his own class and plays with marbles. However, deep inside him there is a certain element of dignity and nobility. At heart Bellgrove is kindly, and if weak, at least has the humility to be aware of his faults. He becomes something of a father figure to Titus.

=== The Thing ===
An important development for Titus is his brief meeting with his "foster sister": a feral girl known only as "The Thing", the daughter of Titus' wet-nurse, Keda of the Bright Carvers. The Thing, being an illegitimate child, is exiled by the Carvers and lives a feral life in the forests around Gormenghast. Titus first meets her when he escapes from the confines of Gormenghast into the outside world. Titus is entranced by her wild grace, and sets out to meet her. He does so, and holds her briefly, but she flees him and is fatally struck by lightning. However, her fierce independence inspires Titus, and gives him courage to later leave his home.

=== The unmasking of Steerpike ===
Due to the vigilance of the old servant Flay, Steerpike is eventually unmasked as the murderer of the aunts of Titus, Cora and Clarice. He becomes a renegade within the castle, using his extensive knowledge to hide within its vast regions, and waging a guerrilla campaign of random killing with his catapult. Steerpike's capture seems impossible until the entire kingdom of Gormenghast is submerged in a flood, due to endless rains. The mud dwellers are forced to take refuge in the castle and the castle's own inhabitants are also forced to retreat to higher and higher floors as the flood waters keep rising. Fuchsia, grown increasingly melancholic and withdrawn after the death of her father and betrayal by Steerpike, briefly contemplates suicide. At the last moment, she changes her mind, but slips and falls from a window, striking her head on the way down and drowning in the floodwaters. Unaware of the accident when they find her body, both Countess Gertrude and Titus are convinced that Steerpike is to blame, and both resolve to bring the murderer to justice.

So begins an epic manhunt through the rapidly flooding castle, with Steerpike forced into ever smaller areas and eventually surrounded by the castle's forces. Even at this late stage, his ruthlessness and cunning mean that Steerpike almost evades capture. However, Titus realises that he is hiding in the ivy against the castle walls, and full of rage and hatred against Steerpike he pursues and kills him himself. Despite being hailed as a hero, Titus is intent on leaving Gormenghast to explore a wider world, and the novel ends with him dramatically riding away to seek his fortune in the unknown lands outside.

Mark Robertson's cover illustration for the Mandarin paperback edition

== Other minor characters ==
The Poet: Known only by his professional name, the Poet holds a relatively important function of ritual in the castle. He is described as having a wedge-shaped head and a voice "as strange and deep as a lugubrious ocean". After Barquentine's death and Steerpike's unmasking as a traitor, he is hastily appointed as the new Master of Ritual.

Bright Carvers or Mud Dwellers: Hereditary population of the extensive Mud Village situated up against and outside the walls of Gormenghast Castle, who are famed for their skill in woodcarving.

Opus Fluke, Flannelcat, Shred, Shrivell, Mulefire and Perch-Prism: School professors.

Cutflower: School professor. A dandy and a fop.

Deadyawn: Headmaster of the Gormenghast School. Spends most of his time asleep in a tall high chair on wheels, pushed around by his assistant, the Fly. He is killed whilst organising the search for Titus when the Fly slips and accidentally tips him out of his high chair onto his head. Bellgrove immediately assumes command of the school.

(The) Fly: Deadyawn's assistant. His main function appears to push Deadyawn around in his high chair and keep his hot water bottle topped up. After accidentally killing his master he leaps out of a window to his death.

The Leader: School professor. Only known as "The Leader", this ancient bearded character proposes a philosophy where everything in this world is an illusion – even including sensations such as pain. He is forcibly brought into reality and subsequently dies, when his long white beard is set alight by a young man during an argument.

Spiregrain, Splint and Throd: School professors. Disciples of The Leader, they live in the thrall of his nihilistic teachings. Upon witnessing the Leader's death, they are liberated to celebrate life.

Craggmire: The Acrobat. The Acrobat takes no part in the plot. His only mention is when he is spied upon by Steerpike (for no apparent reason) through the elaborate system of mirrors and spy holes which Steerpike has installed in a disused chimney.

== Adaptations ==
Gormenghast has been the subject of many adaptations, including film, live theatre, radio performances, television serials, and an opera.
