= Kendall =

Kendall may refer to:

== Places ==
=== Australia ===
- Kendall, New South Wales

=== United States ===
- Kendall, Florida
- Kendall, Kansas
- Kendall, Missouri
- Kendall, New York
- Kendall, Washington
- Kendall, Lafayette County, Wisconsin
- Kendall, Monroe County, Wisconsin
- Kendall County, Illinois
- Kendall County, Texas
- Kendall Green, Pompano Beach, Florida
- Kendall Grove, Virginia
- Kendall Park, New Jersey
- Boonville, California (formerly "Kendall's City")
- Kendall Square, a neighborhood in Cambridge, Massachusetts
- Kendall Township, Kendall County, Illinois
- Kendall Township, Hamilton County, Kansas
- Kendall Township, Kearny County, Kansas
- Kendall West, Florida

== Geographical features ==
- Kendall Basin, an ice-free cirque in Antarctica
- Kendall Island, an uninhabited arctic island in Canada
- Kendall Mountain, a peak and ski area in Colorado
- Kendall Peak, a mountain summit in Washington state
- Kendall Peak (Colorado), a summit in Colorado
- Kendall River, a small river in the Northwest Territories of Canada
- Kendall Terrace, a volcanic ash terrace in the Shetland Islands of Great Britain

== Schools ==
- Kendall College of Art and Design, Grand Rapids, Michigan, USA
- Kendall College, Chicago, Illinois, USA

== People ==
- Kendall (given name)
- Kendall (surname)
- Cynddelw Brydydd Mawr (in English "Kendall"), a 12th-century Welsh poet

== Businesses ==
- Kendall & Sons Ltd, a British umbrella manufacturer and ladies fashion retailer
- Kendall Healthcare Products, an Irish healthcare provider that became Covidien after its acquisition by Tyco Healthcare

== Other uses ==
- The Kendalls, a former American country music duo
- Kendall 32, a fiberglass cruising boat of the late 1960s
- Kendall tau rank correlation coefficient, developed by Maurice Kendall

== See also ==
- Kendal (disambiguation)
- Kendel (disambiguation)
- Kendell (disambiguation)
- Kendale Lakes, Florida
