= Kendall (surname) =

The surname Kendall, Kendl, or Kendal (also spelt Kendell, Kendoll, Kendel, Kendle, Kindell, Kindel, or Kindle) has two widely accepted origins. The first is from the market town of Kendal in Cumbria. The earliest recorded form of this town's name is in 1095 as Kircabikendala, literally "Church by Kent dale". The second is as an anglicization of Middle Welsh Kyndelw (modern Welsh Cynddelw), a given name, as in Cynddelw Brydydd Mawr (Kyndelw Brydyt Maur).

Kendall is a gender-neutral name of British origin. Traditionally a surname, it means "the Kent river valley."

== Kendall ==
The name Kendall may refer to:

- Alan Kendall (born 1944), English musician and lead guitarist for the Bee Gees
- Amos Kendall (1789–1869), American politician and U.S. postmaster general under Andrew Jackson and Martin Van Buren
- Anthony Kendall (born 1999), American football player
- Arnold Kendall (1925–2003), English footballer
- Arthur Samuel Kendall (1861–1944), Canadian physician
- Austin Kendall (born 1997), American football player
- Barbara Kendall (born 1967), New Zealand boardsailor
- Bill Kendall (ice hockey) (1910–1996), Canadian hockey player
- Brian Kendall (boxer) (1948–1998), New Zealand boxer
- Bridget Kendall (born 1956), English radio correspondent
- Bruce Biers Kendall (1919–2012), American politician
- Bruce Kendall (born 1964), New Zealand Olympian
- Carl Kendall, Canadian hockey player
- Carol Kendall (1917–2012), American children's author
- Cate Kendall, pen name used by Australian novelists Michelle Hammer and Lisa Blundell
- Charles West Kendall (1828–1914), American politician and entrepreneur
- Charley Kendall (born 2000), English footballer
- Charlie Kendall (born 1935), American football player
- Cy Kendall (1898–1953), American actor
- David Kendall (disambiguation), multiple people, including:
  - Dave Kendall (1963–2026), British-American journalist
  - David Kendall (director) (1957–2026), American director, writer, and producer
  - David E. Kendall (born 1944), American attorney who represented Bill Clinton
  - David George Kendall (1918–2007), English statistician
- Denise Huxtable Kendall, fictional character from the sitcom The Cosby Show
- Donald M. Kendall (1921–2020), American businessman and former CEO of Pepsi
- Drew Kendall (born 2001), American football player
- Edward Kendall (disambiguation), multiple people, including:
  - Edward Calvin Kendall (1886–1972), American chemist
  - Edward H. Kendall (1842–1901), American architect
  - Edward "Ned" Kendall (1808–1861), American bandleader and musician (bugle)
  - Edward Nicholas Kendall (1800–1845), English hydrographer
- Elton Joe Kendall (born 1954), American judge
- Elva R. Kendall (1893–1968), U.S. representative
- Ezra Kendall (1861–1910), American actor-comedian, humorist, playwright and author
- Ezra Otis Kendall (1818–1899), American professor, astronomer and mathematician
- Frank Kendall III (born 1949), American attorney
- Fred Kendall (born 1949), American baseball player
- Gary Kendall, Canadian musician and lead bassist for the Downchild Blues Band.
- George H. Kendall (c. 1854 – 1924), president of the New York Bank Note Company
- George Kennedy (sports promoter) (born "George Kendall"; 1881–1921), Canadian sports promoter and owner of the Montreal Canadiens
- Graham Kendall (born 1961), English academic and professor of computer science at the University of Nottingham
- Helen Kendall (1892–1985), Canadian military nurse
- Henry Edward Kendall (1776–1875), English architect
- Henry Ernest Kendall (1864–1949), lieutenant governor of Nova Scotia
- Henry George Kendall (1874–1965), English sea captain
- Henry Kendall (actor) (1897–1962), English actor
- Henry Kendall (ornithologist) (1849–1934), English-Australian ornithologist
- Henry Kendall (poet) (1839–1882), an Australian poet.
- Henry Way Kendall (1926–1999), American particle physicist and Nobel Laureate
- Holliday Bickerstaffe Kendall (1844–1919), an English Primitive Methodist minister
- Howard Kendall (1946–2015), English footballer
- James Kendall (chemist) (1889–1978), English chemist
- James Kendall (politician) (1647–1708), English soldier, Member of Parliament and Governor of Barbados
- Jason Kendall (born 1974), American baseball player
- Jo Kendall (1938–2022), English actress
- Joe Kendall (American football) (1909–1965), American football player
- John D. Kendall, American educator and promoter of the Suzuki method
- John W. Kendall (1934–1992), U.S. representative
- Jonas Kendall (1757–1844), U.S. representative
- Joseph G. Kendall (1788–1847), U.S. representative
- Joseph M. Kendall (1863–1933), U.S. representative
- Kate Kendall (born 1973), Australian actress
- Kay Kendall (1926–1959), American actress
- Ken Kendall (1884–1969), Australian footballer
- Kenneth Kendall (1924–2012), British radio and television broadcaster
- Kerri Kendall (born 1970), American model and actress
- King Kendall, American vocalist and videogame designer
- Larcum Kendall (1719–1790), British watchmaker
- Levon Kendall (born 1984), Canadian basketballer
- Liz Kendall (born 1971), British Member of Parliament (MP)
- Luke Kendall (1981), Australian professional basketball player
- Malcolm Kendall-Smith (born 1968 or 1969), former medical officer in the British Royal Air Force, born in Australia, raised in New Zealand, has dual British-New Zealand citizenship
- Maria Kendall, fictional character on the BBC television series Holby City, portrayed by actress Phoebe Thomas
- Marie Kendall (1873–1964), British music hall comedian and actress
- Mark Kendall (footballer, born 1958) (1958–2008), Welsh footballer
- Mark Kendall (footballer, born 1961), English former professional footballer
- Mark Kendall (born 1957), American guitarist for the band Great White
- Maurice Kendall (1907–1983), English statistician
- May Kendall (born Emma Goldworth Kendall) (1861–1943), English poet, novelist, and satirist
- Megyn Kelly (formerly "Megyn Kendall") (born 1970), is a journalist, former attorney, and news pundit and political commentator
- Milo Kendall (1819–1905), American lawyer
- Nathan E. Kendall (1868–1936), American politician
- Nicholas Kendall (Conservative politician) (1800–1878), MP for East Cornwall
- Nicholas Kendall (priest) (died 1740), Bishop of Crediton and Bishop of Plymouth
- Nicholas Kendall (Royalist) (1577–1643), MP for Lostwithiel
- Paul Kendall (born 1954), British audio engineer
- Paul Murray Kendall (1911–1973), American academic and historian
- Paul Wilkins Kendall (1898–1983), American army commander
- Percy Fry Kendall (1856–1936), English geologist
- Pete Kendall (born 1973), former American football guard
- Peter Kendall (disambiguation), multiple people
- Raymond Kendall (born 1933), British law enforcement officer
- Richard Kendall Brooke (1930–1996), South African ornithologist
- Robert Kendall (disambiguation), multiple people
- Roy Kendall (1899–1972), English-born Australian politician and intelligence agent
- R. T. Kendall (born 1935), English Christian writer, speaker, and teacher
- Ryan Kendall (born 1989), English footballer
- Samuel A. Kendall (1859–1933), American politician
- Sarah Kendall (born 1976), Australian comedian who moved to the UK in 2000
- Skip Kendall (born 1964), American professional golfer
- Sonny Kendall (born 2006), British actor
- Suzy Kendall (born Frieda Harrison, 1944), British actress
- Thomas Kendall (1778–1832), New Zealand lapsed missionary, recorder of the Māori language, schoolmaster, arms dealer, and Pākehā Māori.
- Tim Kendall (born 1970), English poet and literary magazine founder, editor and critic
- Toggie Kendall (1878–1915), rugby union player and captain
- Tom Kendall (1851–1924), English-born Australian cricketer
- Tommy Kendall (born 1966), American race car driver and television broadcaster
- Tony Kendall (disambiguation), multiple people
- Virginia Mary Kendall, born 1962, American federal judge
- William Denis Kendall (1903–1995), British Member of Parliament
- William Kendall (disambiguation), multiple people
- Willmoore Kendall (1909–1967), American conservative writer and professor of political philosophy

== Kendal ==
The name Kendal may refer to:

- Felicity Kendal (born 1946), English television actress
- Geoffrey Kendal (1910–1988), English actor and theatre manager; father of Felicity Kendal
- Jennifer Kendal (1933–1984), British actress; sister of Felicity Kendal
- John Kendal (c. 1400 – 1485), secretary to Richard III of England
- Madge Kendal (1848–1935), English actress
- Norman Kendal, (1880–1966), English barrister and senior police officer
- William Hunter Kendal (1843–1917), English actor

== Kendell ==
The name Kendell may refer to:

- Don Kendell
- Ebenezer Kendell
- Julia Kendell
- Kate Kendell
- Robert Evan Kendell
- Wayne Kendell
- William Kendell

== Kendle ==
The name Kendle may refer to:

- Charles Kendle
- William Kendle

== Kindell ==
The name Kindell may refer to:

- Billy Zoom (born "Tyson Kindell")

== Kindel ==
The name Kindel may refer to:

- George John Kindel
- Steve Kindel

== Kindle ==
The name Kindle may refer to:

- Sergio Kindle
