= Kendel =

Kendel may refer to:

- Kendel (river), river of North Rhine-Westphalia, Germany
- Kendel (surname)

== See also ==
- Kendal (disambiguation)
- Kendall (disambiguation)
- Kendell (disambiguation)
