= Kendal (disambiguation) =

Kendal is a market town in Cumbria, England.

Kendal may also refer to:

== Places ==
Barbados

- Kendal, Barbados

Belize

- Kendal, Belize

Canada

- Kendal, Ontario
- Kendal, Saskatchewan

Indonesia

- Kendal Regency, a regency in Central Java Province
  - Kendal, Kendal, capital of Kendal Regency

Iran

- Kendal, Kohgiluyeh and Boyer-Ahmad

Jamaica

- Kendal, Jamaica

South Africa

- Kendal Power Station

Trinidad and Tobago

- Argyle-Kendal, a town in Tobago

United Kingdom

- Barony of Kendal, a subdivision of the historic county of Westmorland
- Kendal (UK Parliament constituency) 1832–1918 parliamentary borough
- Kendal House, an eighteenth century house

United States

- Kendal, Ohio, town absorbed into the town of Massillon in 1853

== People ==
- Kendal (surname)
- Duke of Kendal
- William Parr, 1st Baron Parr of Kendal (1434–1483)

== Businesses ==
- Kendals, a department store in Manchester, England, taking on the House of Fraser name in 2005
- Kendal Industrial Estate, Indonesian real estate company

== Other uses ==
- Kendal (horse), a thoroughbred racehorse and sire
- Kendal Mint Cake, a sugar-based confection flavored with peppermint.

== See also ==
- Kendall (disambiguation)
- Kendel (disambiguation)
- Kendell (disambiguation)
