= Kendell =

Kendell may refer to:

- Kendell Airlines, regional airline in Australia
- Kendell (surname)

== See also ==
- Kendel (disambiguation)
- Kendal (disambiguation)
- Kendall (disambiguation)
