= List of United States tornadoes in October 2010 =

This is a list of all tornadoes that were confirmed by local offices of the National Weather Service in the United States in October 2010.

== United States yearly total ==
Confirmed tornadoes by Enhanced Fujita rating
EFU	EF0	EF1	EF2	EF3	EF4	EF5	Total
0	768	342	127	32	13	0	1,282

== October ==
Confirmed tornadoes by Enhanced Fujita rating
EFU	EF0	EF1	EF2	EF3	EF4	EF5	Total
0	61	31	11	2	0	0	108

Note: 3 tornadoes were confirmed in the final totals, but do not have a listed rating.

=== October 6 event ===
List of confirmed tornadoes – Wednesday, October 6, 2010 (Note: All dates are based on the local time zone where the tornado touched down; however, all times are in Coordinated Universal Time for consistency.)
EF#	Location	County / Parish	State	Start Coord.	Time (UTC)	Path length	Max width	Summary
EF2	NW of Washington Park to NE of Lost Eden	Coconino	AZ	34.44°N 111.3°W	08:50–09:12	14.8 mi (23.8 km)	400 yd (370 m)	Hundreds of ponderosa pine trees were snapped or blown down along the path. An alligator juniper tree that was 2.5 feet (0.76 m) in diameter was snapped. Trees were blown down across SR 87 for 2 miles (3.2 km).
EF2	NW of Sedona	Coconino	AZ	34.996°N 111.878°W	11:55–12:02	4.9 mi (7.9 km)	400 yd (370 m)	Many trees were snapped or blown down. Two forest roads were completely blocked by fallen trees.
EF2	W of Kachina Village to Bellemont to NNW of Fort Valley	Coconino	AZ	35.106°N 111.839°W	12:07–12:44	26 mi (42 km)	500 yd (460 m)	Over 100 houses and several businesses were damaged, including at least 21 houses that were significantly damaged or destroyed. Massive tree damage was also reported with thousands of trees snapped, and campers isolated as a result. An RV dealership was impacted, with over 30 RVs demolished and thrown onto I-40. 75 power poles were knocked down. The tornado passed only 2/3 mile (1.1 km) east of the National Weather Service office in Bellemont. Seven people were injured. An anemometer placed by the Northern Arizona University School of Forestry measured an instantaneous wind gust of 185 miles per hour (298 km/h), a 1-second wind gust of 161 miles per hour (259 km/h), and a 3-second wind speed of 115 miles per hour (185 km/h).
EF3	WSW of Kachina Village to Bellemont to NNW of Fort Valley	Coconino	AZ	35.05°N 111.865°W	12:54–13:50	30.06 mi (48.38 km)	800 yd (730 m)	A long track, wedge tornado paralleled the track of the previous EF2 tornado 1 mile (1.6 km) to the west. The tornado was sighted by NWS employees as this tornado passed only 1/3 mile (0.54 km) west of the National Weather Service office in Bellemont. Multiple semi-trucks and trailers were flipped on I-40, and 28 rail cars were derailed. Forest damage was severe, and many roads were blocked, and thousands of trees were downed in a circular pattern in a large swath. A few trees in the worst affected areas sustained debarking, and power poles were also snapped. Some structures were damaged. This is currently the longest tracked tornado in Arizona.
EF2	SW of Kachina Village to Western Bellemont	Coconino	AZ	34.982°N 111.927°W	13:50–14:14	18.6 mi (29.9 km)	600 yd (550 m)	Extensive forest damage occurred, with more forest roads being blocked due to fallen trees. This tornado passed 2 miles (3.2 km) west of the National Weather Service office in Bellemont as it was dissipating. The path of this tornado may have been made up of three different tornadoes instead of one longer-tracked tornado due to some evidence of extensive cycling.
EF1	SSE of Chalender	Coconino	AZ	35.108°N 111.965°W	15:29-15:33	0.7 mi (1.1 km)	100 yd (91 m)	A tornado was determined via aerial photography and surveys.
EF1	NNW of Sedona	Coconino	AZ	34.981°N 111.876°W	16:10–16:15	1.1 mi (1.8 km)	100 yd (91 m)	A tornado along a short path was determined via damage surveys and aerial imagery.
EF0	ENE of Bumble Bee	Yavapai	AZ	34.236°N 111.973°W	17:30–17:35	4 mi (6.4 km)	50 yd (46 m)	Tornado was observed as it remained over grasslands east of I-17.
EF3	SE of Tuba City	Coconino	AZ	35.909°N 111.005°W	18:15–18:20	≥4 mi (6.4 km)	1,100 yd (1,000 m)	A large tornado tracked over an unpopulated region. Three metal truss transmission towers were destroyed – one of which was flattened – on the Navajo Nation. The total path length of the tornado is unknown since it passed over a very rural area.
EF0	Munds Park	Coconino	AZ	34.908°N 111.655°W	19:10–19:20	3.8 mi (6.1 km)	200 yd (180 m)	A tornado was visually observed as it crossed I-17. Minimal damage occurred.
EF0	Eastern Flagstaff	Coconino	AZ	35.159°N 111.548°W	19:20–19:25	1.7 mi (2.7 km)	100 yd (91 m)	A tornado was observed on the eastern side of Flagstaff. Little damage occurred.
EF0	WSW of Canyonlands National Park	Wayne	UT	38.28°N 110.28°W	20:00–20:05	1.24 mi (2.00 km)	10 yd (9.1 m)	About 30 juniper trees were snapped or uprooted in a remote forested area.

=== October 7 event ===
List of reported tornadoes - Thursday, October 7, 2010
EF#	Location	County	Coord.	Time (UTC)	Path length	Comments/Damage
Idaho
EF0	SW of Ferdinand	Idaho	46.12°N 116.42°W	2320	1 mile (1.6 km)	Brief rope tornado damaged a barn and moved topsoil around.
EF0	SW of Harris Siding	Lewis	46.18°N 116.36°W	2341	unknown	Brief tornado touchdown with no damage.
Sources: NCDC Storm Data

=== October 18 event ===
List of reported tornadoes - Monday, October 18, 2010
EF#	Location	County	Coord.	Time (UTC)	Path length	Comments/Damage
Arizona
EF0	E of Kingman	Mohave	35.20°N 113.96°W	2343	1 mile (1.6 km)	A few houses sustained minor damage.
Sources: SPC Storm Reports for 10/18/10, NCDC Storm Data

=== October 21 event ===
List of reported tornadoes - Thursday, October 21, 2010
EF#	Location	County	Coord.	Time (UTC)	Path length	Comments/Damage
Texas
EF0	SW of Rankin	Upton	31.20°N 101.96°W	2248	1 mile (1.6 km)	Intermittent tornado touchdowns over open country.
Arizona
EF0	NNE of Cottonwood	Apache	36.15°N 109.84°W	2334	1 mile (1.6 km)	Damage limited to trees and bushes.
New Mexico
EF0	N of Roswell	Chaves	33.62°N 104.63°W	2347	3 miles (4.8 km)	Tornado videotaped by public but remained over open country.
EF0	WNW of Acme	Chaves	33.66°N 104.57°W	0003	1 mile (1.6 km)	Tornado videotaped by public but remained over open country.
Sources: NCDC Storm Data

=== October 23 event ===
List of reported tornadoes - Saturday, October 23, 2010
EF#	Location	County	Coord.	Time (UTC)	Path length	Comments/Damage
Texas
EF0	Fort Worth	Tarrant	32.802°N 97.202°W	1755	unknown	Brief tornado with damage to roofs and fences.
Sources: SPC Storm Reports for 10/23/10 WFAA "Tornadoes touch down south and east of Dallas"

=== October 24 event ===
List of reported tornadoes - Sunday, October 24, 2010
EF#	Location	County	Coord.	Time (UTC)	Path length	Comments/Damage
Texas
EF0	N of Daingerfield	Morris	33.07°N 94.72°W	2030	3 miles (4.8 km)	Damage limited to a few trees.
EF2	Rice area	Navarro	32.23°N 96.50°W	2255	7 miles (11 km)	Five houses were destroyed and three others were damaged. A high school was also heavily damaged and a train was derailed. A baseball field was damaged and vehicles were flipped on the interstate. Trees were snapped and uprooted as well. Several people were injured.
EF0	Lone Oak	Hunt	33.00°N 95.93°W	2300	200 yards (180 m)	Brief tornado damaged 10 houses in a residential subdivision.
EF0	N of Mount Vernon	Franklin	33.19°N 95.23°W	2315	0.25 miles (400 m)	Brief tornado with minor tree damage.
EF0	N of Mount Pleasant	Morris	33.21°N 94.98°W	2347	0.75 miles (1.21 km)	Damage limited to a few trees.
Alabama
EF1	Elsanor	Baldwin	30.54°N 87.55°W	0210	1.7 miles (2.7 km)	A mobile home and a metal shed were destroyed and a brick houses sustained minor damage. One person sustained minor injuries.
Michigan
EF0	WNW of Coloma	Berrien	42.20°N 86.34°W	0250	0.1 miles (160 m)	Brief tornado with minor damage to two houses and a roof blown off a barn.
Arkansas
EF0	W of Crystal Valley	Pulaski		unknown	0.77 miles (1.24 km)	A barn lost its roof, and some trees were damaged.
Sources: SPC Storm Reports for 10/24/10, NWS Fort Worth, NWS Shreveport, NWS Mobile, NWS Little Rock

=== October 25 event ===
List of reported tornadoes - Monday, October 25, 2010
EF#	Location	County	Coord.	Time (UTC)	Path length	Comments/Damage
Tennessee
EF1	Pleasant Hill	Moore	30.67°N 88.14°W	0540	1.2 miles (1.9 km)	A hay barn was destroyed and two houses had porch damage. Trees were also knocked down.
Alabama
EF1	S of Haleyville	Winston	34.18°N 87.60°W	0705	10.5 miles (16.9 km)	A large barn and a shed were destroyed and three houses were damaged. Extensive tree damage along the path.
EF0	Arab	Marshall	34.34°N 86.50°W	0923	1 mile (1.6 km)	Minor damage to a house and significant damage to an outbuilding. Numerous trees were snapped.
EF0	NE of Section	Jackson	34.61°N 85.92°W	0952	2.2 miles (3.5 km)	A trailer and a shed were destroyed, a house was damaged, and several trees were downed.
EF2	Ider area	Jackson, DeKalb, Dade (GA)	34.68°N 85.64°W	1002	25.7 miles (41.4 km)	Long track tornado with major damage to several houses and barns, one of the houses was nearly destroyed. Several people were injured.
EF1	Near Rosalie	Jackson, DeKalb	34.63°N 85.78°W	1005	15.7 miles (25.3 km)	A house, two barns, and several other structures were damaged. Numerous trees were downed.
EF1	Mobile	Mobile	30.67°N 88.14°W	1120	1 mile (1.6 km)	Several houses and commercial buildings, including a shopping center, were damaged.
Sources: NWS Mobile, NWS Huntsville, NWS Birmingham, NWS Peachtree City

=== October 26 event ===
List of reported tornadoes - Tuesday, October 26, 2010
EF#	Location	County	Coord.	Time (UTC)	Path length	Comments/Damage
Illinois
EF1	ESE of Ashton	Lee		1041	1.1 miles (1.8 km)	Several farm outbuildings were destroyed and a metal silo was punched inward.
EF1	W of Plato Center	Kane		714	1.50 miles (2.41 km)	Straight line wind damage was reported. Also a few barns were destroyed.
EF1	NW of Elburn	Kane	41.89°N 88.51°W	1155	0.75 miles (1.21 km)	Two farm houses were damaged and a grain bin and two barns were destroyed.
EF2	E of Peotone	Will	41.33°N 87.72°W	1240	2.9 miles (4.7 km)	One house was severely damaged with the second level destroyed. Power poles were also damaged.
Wisconsin
EF1	NNE of Kenosha	Racine, Kenosha	42.66°N 87.89°W	1247	6 miles (9.7 km)	Two industrial buildings were heavily damaged and a barn and garage were destroyed. Trees and power poles were also knocked down. Two people were injured.
Indiana
EF0	SE of Malden	Porter	41.33°N 86.97°W	1333	200 yards (180 m)	One outbuilding was damaged by this brief tornado.
EF1	Wanatah	LaPorte	41.43°N 86.89°W	1342	1 mile (1.6 km)	A garage and a shelter were heavily damaged and power poles were knocked down.
EF0	ENE of Kokomo	Howard	40.49°N 86.08°W	1405	unknown	Several houses sustained damage, one of which had significant damage.
EF1	E of Bracken	Huntington	40.94°N 85.62°W	1421	0.6 miles (970 m)	A metal grain barn and several outbuildings were destroyed.
EF0	SW of Oswego	Kosciusko	41.30°N 85.82°W	1431	1 mile (1.6 km)	Numerous houses in a subdivision sustained shingle damage. Corn was flattened and yard items were thrown, and a radio tower and power poles were bent.
EF0	SW of Luther	Huntington, Whitley	41.00°N 85.60°W	1433	2 miles (3.2 km)	One house sustained minor damage. A grain bin and several outbuildings were destroyed.
EF0	Wabash	Wabash	40.82°N 85.84°W	1420	4.8 miles (7.7 km)	Minor damage at a Walmart store and a vocational school.
EF1	NE of Peabody	Whitley	41.11°N 85.47°W	1440	2 miles (3.2 km)	Numerous houses sustained minor damage, and several outbuildings were severely damaged. Numerous trees were also uprooted.
EF1	S of Grabill	Allen	41.06°N 84.90°W	1502	7 miles (11 km)	Numerous houses were damaged and barns destroyed. Trees and power poles were knocked down.
EF1	SW of Cuba	Allen	41.15°N 84.98°W	1504	1.5 miles (2.4 km)	Several barns were heavily damaged and a house sustained minor damage. Four train cars were blown off the tracks.
Kentucky
EF0	S of Pembroke	Christian	36.75°N 87.36°W	1352	2 miles (3.2 km)	A barn sustained minor damage and a few trees were snapped.
EF0	N of Trenton	Todd	36.77°N 87.26°W	1358	0.25 miles (400 m)	Brief tornado blew recreational equipment around a yard and damaged a barn.
EF0	NE of Graham	Muhlenberg	37.26°N 87.26°W	1420	200 yards (180 m)	Brief tornado with minor tree damage.
EF0	Hopkinsville area	Christian	36.85°N 87.49°W	1420	2.5 miles (4.0 km)	A Food Lion store sustained roof damage, and a barn and two storage buildings were heavily damaged.
EF0	SW of Mount Washington	Bullitt	38.08°N 85.51°W	1551	150 yards (140 m)	A concrete workshop was heavily damage.
EF1	SE of Bowling Green	Warren	36.94°N 86.40°W	1608	1.3 miles (2.1 km)	Intermittent tornado touchdown heavily damaged a barn and damaged some trees.
EF1	Middlesboro	Bell	36.61°N 83.72°W	2210	0.7 miles (1.1 km)	Several buildings and numerous trees were damaged in town.
Ohio
EF0	NW of Convoy	Van Wert	40.92°N 84.76°W	1502	3.5 miles (5.6 km)	A barn lost its roof, a shed was destroyed and a camper and semi-trailer were blown down.
EF1	NW of Grover Hill	Van Wert, Paulding	40.99°N 84.59°W	1512	9.25 miles (14.89 km)	Numerous houses sustained minor damage. Two barns and a grain bin were destroyed and many trees were uprooted.
EF1	E of Oakwood	Paulding, Putnam	41.08°N 84.34°W	1529	5 miles (8.0 km)	A few houses sustained minor shingle damage and several barns and sheds were destroyed.
EF1	N of Eldorado	Preble, Darke	39.91°N 84.69°W	1540	5.5 miles (8.9 km)	Two houses sustained minor damage and barns and outbuildings sustained major damage. Several trees were uprooted.
EF0	SW of Cridersville	Auglaize	40.67°N 84.11°W	1558	65 yards (60 m)	Very brief tornado damaged a barn and a garage.
EF2	Cridersville area	Auglaize, Allen	40.63°N 84.17°W	1559	2.2 miles (3.5 km)	A house, a barn and a garage were destroyed and numerous other houses were damaged, some heavily. A brick gymnasium was also destroyed.
EF0	SE of Sabina	Clinton, Fayette	39.44°N 83.64°W	1720	4 miles (6.4 km)	Several barns were heavily damaged or destroyed. Two houses sustained minor damage.
EF0	E of Sabina	Fayette	39.49°N 83.54°W	1730	2 miles (3.2 km)	A large storage facility was heavily damaged and several sheds and outbuildings were also damaged.
EF0	SW of Commercial Point	Pickaway	39.72°N 83.11°W	1752	1.5 miles (2.4 km)	Several barns and outbuildings were heavily damaged or destroyed.
EF0	N of Groveport	Franklin	39.87°N 82.87°W	1805	100 yards (90 m)	Brief tornado destroyed two barns.
EF0	E of Pataskala	Licking	40.00°N 82.53°W	1827	0.5 miles (800 m)	Several houses were damaged and trees were snapped.
Alabama
EF1	Hillsboro	Lawrence	34.65°N 87.13°W	1823	1.1 miles (1.8 km)	Several trees were uprooted.
EF0	Greenbrier	Limestone	34.64°N 86.85°W	2040	500 yards (460 m)	Brief tornado damaged a few small trees.
EF1	W of Geraldine	DeKalb	34.35°N 86.07°W	2303	4.25 miles (6.84 km)	One house sustained significant damage, along with a workshop, a boat and three vehicles. Trees were also snapped.
EF0	McVille	Marshall	34.27°N 86.12°W	2313	0.9 miles (1.4 km)	Minor damage to trees and a barn.
Tennessee
EF0	Harrison	Hamilton	35.09°N 85.20°W	2200	0.1 miles (160 m)	Brief tornado with minor damage to a church and a few trees twisted and snapped.
EF2	Chattanooga	Hamilton		2250	1.2 miles (1.9 km)	Tornado touched down over Chickamauga Dam. An apartment complex lost its roof and a cement plant was destroyed. Two trailers were blown into the water and destroyed as well.
North Carolina
EF2	W of Vale	Lincoln	35.54°N 81.48°W	2310	3 miles (4.8 km)	Several houses were destroyed and many others were damaged, some heavily. Many trees were also snapped or uprooted. 12 people were injured, one seriously.
EF2	Claremont	Catawba	35.71°N 81.16°W	2345	2 miles (3.2 km)	Many trees were uprooted or snapped and grave stones were knocked over. Roof torn off of a furniture distribution center along with lesser roof damage to other homes and businesses. Tractor-trailers were flipped over as well.
EF1	King (1st tornado)	Stokes	36.28°N 80.36°W	0314	2.25 miles (3.62 km)	Numerous trees were snapped and a carport was heavily damaged.
South Carolina
EF0	NW of Tigerville	Greenville	35.08°N 82.48°W	2310	5 miles (8.0 km)	Extensive tree damage with many snapped or uprooted, a few falling on houses. Boats were also damaged on Chinquapin Lake.
Sources: NWS Chicago, NWS Northern Indiana, NWS Milwaukee, NWS Indianapolis, NWS Wilmington, OH, NWS Morristown, NWS Louisville, NWS Paducah, NWS Blacksburg, NWS Jackson, KY, NWS Huntsville, NWS Greenville/Spartanburg

=== October 27 event ===
List of reported tornadoes - Wednesday, October 27, 2010
EF#	Location	County	Coord.	Time (UTC)	Path length	Comments/Damage
Virginia
EF0	Aiken Summit area	Henry, Pittsylvania	36.61°N 79.72°W	0414	5.4 miles (8.7 km)	Three houses sustained minor damage and five outbuildings were damaged.
EF2	NW of Virgilina	Halifax	36.57°N 78.88°W	0652	4 miles (6.4 km)	Several houses were damaged and barns and outbuildings were destroyed. Major and extensive tree damage with thousands of trees snapped or uprooted.
EF0	N of Skipwith	Mecklenburg	36.76°N 78.49°W	0714	1.25 miles (2.01 km)	A shed was damaged and numerous trees and power lines were knocked down.
EF1	Richmond area	Richmond (city), Hanover	37.55°N 77.50°W	2100	11.5 miles (18.5 km)	Tornado developed on the north side of Richmond and tracked through the eastern suburbs. Many trees and power poles were knocked down, damaging over 100 houses in the process, a few severely. One person was injured.
North Carolina
EF0	Roxboro Lake	Person	36.37°N 79.15°W	1958	200 yards (180 m)	Damaged limited to a few trees.
EF1	Roxboro	Person	36.39°N 78.95°W	2013	0.5 miles (800 m)	Several mobile homes were damaged, one of them severely. Numerous trees were snapped or uprooted.
EF1	Carr	Orange	36.19°N 79.22°W	2130	2.5 miles (4.0 km)	Two houses and a church sustained significant damage. Many trees were damaged.
EF0	E of Berea	Granville	36.33°N 78.71°W	2215	5.25 miles (8.45 km)	Several houses sustained minor damage and sheds and outbuildings were destroyed.
EF0	W of Middleburg	Vance	36.38°N 78.38°W	2250	2.75 miles (4.43 km)	A BP gas station and two houses sustained minor damage. Many trees were snapped and sheds and outbuildings were destroyed.
EF1	King (2nd tornado)	Stokes	36.26°N 80.36°W	2305	0.75 miles (1.21 km)	Second tornado hit King 20 hours after the first one. About 25 houses were damaged, some of which had roofs blown off. Numerous trees were snapped.
Sources: NWS Wakefield #1, #2, NWS Blacksburg, NWS Raleigh

=== October 28 event ===
List of reported tornadoes - Thursday, October 28, 2010
EF#	Location	County	Coord.	Time (UTC)	Path length	Comments/Damage
Virginia
EF0	N of Courtland	Southampton	36.75°N 77.06°W	0415	unknown	A shed and carport were destroyed and trees were damaged by this brief tornado.
Sources: NCDC Storm Data

== See also ==
- Tornadoes of 2010
- List of United States tornadoes from August to September 2010
- List of United States tornadoes from November to December 2010
