= Kennel (disambiguation) =

Kennel may refer to:

== Dogs ==
- Kennel, a breeding kennel or boarding kennel
- Kennel, a doghouse (a small shed for a dog)
- Kennel, a dog crate
- Kennel, a short-term boarding kennel service for dogs, also known as dog daycare
- Kennel club, an organization for dog breed standards

== Other ==
- Kennel, the AS-1 Kennel missile
- The Kennel, the nickname of the Charlotte Y. Martin Centre, a sports venue at Gonzaga University in the United States
- Kennel, an obsolete term for a gutter at the edge of a street, or an open sewer

== See also ==
- Kennel club
- Kendal (disambiguation)
