= List of United States tornadoes from August to September 2010 =

This is a list of all tornadoes that were confirmed by local offices of the National Weather Service in the United States in August and September 2010.

== United States yearly total ==
Confirmed tornadoes by Enhanced Fujita rating
EFU	EF0	EF1	EF2	EF3	EF4	EF5	Total
0	768	342	127	32	13	0	1,282

== August ==
Confirmed tornadoes by Enhanced Fujita rating
EFU	EF0	EF1	EF2	EF3	EF4	EF5	Total
0	37	15	1	1	1	0	55

=== August 1 event ===
List of reported tornadoes - Sunday, August 1, 2010
EF#	Location	County	Coord.	Time (UTC)	Path length	Comments/Damage
North Dakota
EF1	SE of Rocklake	Towner, Cavalier	48.74°N 99.17°W	0120	20 miles (32 km)	Intermittent long track tornado damaged buildings on two farms and numerous trees and power poles.
EF0	S of Beulah	Mercer	47.03°N 101.81°W	0216	2 miles (3.2 km)	Two grain bins were destroyed and a tree was uprooted.
EF0	NE of Rolette	Rolette	48.70°N 99.81°W	0245	6 miles (9.7 km)	Tornado remained over open country.
Sources: Storm Reports for 08/01/10, NWS Grand Forks, NCDC Storm Data

=== August 2 event ===
List of reported tornadoes - Monday, August 2, 2010
EF#	Location	County	Coord.	Time (UTC)	Path length	Comments/Damage
North Dakota
EF0	NNE of Sweet Briar	Morton	48.70°N 99.81°W	0245	6 miles (9.7 km)	Brief tornado near Crown Butte Dam with no damage.
Sources: NCDC Storm Data

=== August 3 event (West) ===
List of reported tornadoes - Tuesday, August 3, 2010
EF#	Location	County	Coord.	Time (UTC)	Path length	Comments/Damage
Wyoming
EF0	SSW of Rozet	Campbell	44.12°N 105.33°W	1702	unknown	A shed at a coal mine sustained minor damage.
South Dakota
EF0	ENE of Plano	Hanson, Miner	43.83°N 97.81°W	2357	unknown	Brief dusty tornado with no damage.
Arizona
EF0	S of Many Farms	Apache	36.25°N 109.62°W	0015	1 mile (1.6 km)	Landspout tornado confirmed with no damage.
Sources: NCDC Storm Data

=== August 3 event (Northeast) ===
List of reported tornadoes - Tuesday, August 3, 2010
EF#	Location	County	Coord.	Time (UTC)	Path length	Comments/Damage
New York
EF1	ESE of Fonda	Montgomery	42.93°N 74.33°W	2022	400 yards (370 m)	Damage limited primarily to trees.
EF1	ESE of Auriesville	Montgomery	42.92°N 74.31°W	2029	300 yards (270 m)	Damage limited primarily to trees.
Vermont
EF0	W of Peacham	Caledonia	44.33°N 72.22°W	0135	unknown	Brief tornado damaged many trees.
Sources: NWS Albany, NCDC Storm Data

=== August 6 event ===
List of reported tornadoes - Friday, August 6, 2010
EF#	Location	County	Coord.	Time (UTC)	Path length	Comments/Damage
South Carolina
EF0	NE of Branchville	Orangeburg	33.31°N 80.76°W	2319	6 miles (9.7 km)	A few trees were damaged by the intermittent tornado.
Sources: Storm Reports for 08/06/10, NCDC Storm Data

=== August 7 event ===
List of reported tornadoes - Saturday, August 7, 2010
EF#	Location	County	Coord.	Time (UTC)	Path length	Comments/Damage
Florida
EF0	New Smyrna Beach	Volusia	29.00°N 80.91°W	1710	1 mile (1.6 km)	Brief tornado damaged one house, ripping part of the roof off.
EF0	Boca Raton	Palm Beach	26.32°N 80.14°W	2202	2 miles (3.2 km)	Tornado sighted with minimal damage in the community.
North Dakota
EF4	S of Tyler to SW of Doran	Richland (ND), Wilkin (MN)	46.16°N 96.61°W	2325-2350	5 miles (8.0 km)	A violent tornado passed near Tyler, causing a lot of damage. At least 14 farm buildings were obliterated, with others damaged. One barn was completely swept away, with pieces of stone torn from the foundation and thrown into nearby fields. A sugarbeet field was heavily scoured with beets pulled from the ground, and grass scouring was noted elsewhere. A pickup truck was also thrown over 1/2 mile (800 m) away and destroyed, with the engine block ripped out and thrown an additional 2/3 of a mile. Tree debarking occurred, and a farmhouse was heavily damaged as well.
Minnesota
EF0	WNW of Tenney	Wilkin	46.05°N 95.50°W	2325	unknown	Brief tornado touchdown with no damage.
EF0	N of Nashua	Wilkin	46.07°N 95.32°W	2346	1 mile (1.6 km)	Tornado remained over open country.
EF1	NE of Western	Otter Tail	46.19°N 96.11°W	2258	4 miles (6.4 km)	Numerous trees were knocked down and crops were flattened.
EF0	NE of Rothsay	Otter Tail	46.50°N 96.23°W	0033	unknown	Brief tornado in an open field.
EF1	NE of Wendell	Grant, Douglas	46.01°N 95.75°W	0035	21 miles (34 km)	Intermittent tornado touchdown damaged many trees and some power poles.
EF1	SW of Wrightstown	Otter Tail	46.25°N 96.21°W	0059	2 miles (3.2 km)	Damage limited to trees and limbs.
Wisconsin
EF0	SW of Bone Lake	Polk	45.58°N 92.34°W	0437	3 miles (4.8 km)	Many trees were knocked down, a few landing on houses or trailers. Windows were also blown out of a house. One person was injured.
EF1	NE of Cumberland	Barron	45.59°N 91.95°W	0457	3.5 miles (5.6 km)	A barn and a garage were destroyed. Many trees were uprooted or snapped.
Sources: Storm Reports for 08/07/10, NWS Grand Forks, NCDC Storm Data

=== August 9 event ===
List of reported tornadoes - Monday, August 9, 2010
EF#	Location	County	Coord.	Time (UTC)	Path length	Comments/Damage
Colorado
EF0	SSW of Otis	Washington	40.08°N 102.98°W	0142	unknown	Brief tornado touchdown with no damage.
EF1	ENE of Elba	Washington	39.95°N 102.95°W	0144	unknown	Brief tornado destroyed a barn.
Sources: NCDC Storm Data

=== August 10 event ===
List of reported tornadoes - Tuesday, August 10, 2010
EF#	Location	County	Coord.	Time (UTC)	Path length	Comments/Damage
North Dakota
EF2	SW of Thompson	Grand Forks	47.69°N 97.25°W	1836	1 mile (1.6 km)	A large shed was heavily damaged and a grain bin was thrown and damaged. Originally thought to be two tornadoes but confirmed as one.
Iowa
EF0	NNE of Armstrong	Emmet	43.50°N 94.45°W	2244	unknown	Brief tornado over Iowa Lake with no damage.
Sources: NWS Grand Forks, NCDC Storm Data

=== August 11 event ===
List of reported tornadoes - Wednesday, August 11, 2010
EF#	Location	County	Coord.	Time (UTC)	Path length	Comments/Damage
Florida
EF0	Edgewater	Volusia	28.97°N 80.89°W	1605	unknown	Brief waterspout developed on the Intracoastal Waterway and moved ashore damaging a marina, a house and a few trees.
EF0	WSW of Glencoe	Volusia	29.00°N 81.00°W	2005	unknown	Brief tornado in a heavily wooded area damaged a few trees.
Minnesota
EF0	SE of Sveadahl	Watonwan	44.05°N 94.70°W	1858	unknown	A few shingles were removed from houses and small items were knocked down by this brief weak tornado.
Sources: NCDC Storm Data

=== August 12 event ===
List of reported tornadoes - Thursday, August 12, 2010
EF#	Location	County	Coord.	Time (UTC)	Path length	Comments/Damage
Texas
EF0	WSW of Del Mar	Cameron	25.98°N 97.25°W	1715	unknown	Brief tornado sighted at the Port of Brownsville with no damage.
Maryland
EF0	S of Unionville	Frederick	39.44°N 77.18°W	2103	0.25 miles (400 m)	Brief tornado damaged a few trees.
Wyoming
EF0	NE of Emblem	Big Horn	44.61°N 108.29°W	2111	2 miles (3.2 km)	Landspout tornado with no damage.
Minnesota
EF0	SSW of Madison	Lac qui Parle	45.00°N 96.21°W	2254	1 mile (1.6 km)	A few large trees were damaged.
EF0	ESE of Rosen	Lac qui Parle	45.10°N 96.35°W	2305	1 mile (1.6 km)	A porch of a house lost its roof.
EF0	Louisburg	Lac qui Parle	45.16°N 96.16°W	2322	1 mile (1.6 km)	A grain bin was thrown and trees were uprooted.
EF1	N of Brooten	Stearns	45.53°N 95.12°W	0044	6 miles (9.7 km)	Several farms had buildings damaged, including roofs off houses and barns as well as sheds and outbuildings that were completely destroyed. Hundreds of trees were snapped.
EF0	St. Augusta	Stearns	45.51°N 94.24°W	0100	0.25 miles (400 m)	Brief tornado knocked down a few trees.
North Dakota
EF0	NW of Lisbon	Ransom	46.49°N 97.78°W	0140	4 miles (6.4 km)	Numerous trees were damaged along the path.
EF0	W of Bowbells	Burke	48.80°N 102.35°W	0200	unknown	Brief tornado with no damage. Precursor to the main Bowbells tornado.
EF0	NW of Bowbells	Burke	48.82°N 102.27°W	0203	unknown	Second brief tornado with no damage. Precursor to the main Bowbells tornado.
EF3	Bowbells area	Burke, Ward	48.80°N 102.22°W	0226	6 miles (9.7 km)	1 death - One house was heavily damaged and many grain bins and farm buildings were destroyed or flattened. A vehicle was thrown, killing an occupant and severely injuring another. Farm vehicles were also thrown long distances.
Sources: NWS Baltimore/Washington, NWS Bismarck, NWS Twin Cities, NCDC Storm Data

=== August 13 event ===
List of reported tornadoes - Friday, August 13, 2010
EF#	Location	County	Coord.	Time (UTC)	Path length	Comments/Damage
Minnesota
EF1	N of Farmington	Dakota	44.68°N 93.21°W	0804	2 miles (3.2 km)	Numerous houses sustained roof and shingle damage, with some losing most of their roofs. Hundreds of trees were blown down. One person was injured.
EF1	N of Hayfield	Dodge	43.93°N 92.79°W	2022	5 miles (8.0 km)	A barn was destroyed and numerous corn fields were heavily damaged.
EF0	NW of Rapidan	Blue Earth	44.13°N 94.11°W	2235	unknown	Brief tornado damaged a few corn stalks.
EF0	S of Rock Dell	Olmsted	43.90°N 92.65°W	2240	unknown	Brief tornado touchdown with no damage.
Sources: NWS La Crosse, NCDC Storm Data

=== August 16 event ===
List of reported tornadoes - Monday, August 16, 2010
EF#	Location	County	Coord.	Time (UTC)	Path length	Comments/Damage
Colorado
EF0	ENE of Deer Trail	Arapahoe	39.62°N 104.02°W	1957	unknown	Brief tornado touchdown with no damage.
EF0	SW of Agate	Elbert	39.43°N 103.98°W	2016	unknown	Brief tornado touchdown with no damage.
EF0	SSE of Lodi	Morgan	40.08°N 103.58°W	2154	unknown	Brief tornado touchdown with no damage.
EF1	SSE of Brush	Morgan	40.15°N 103.55°W	2217	unknown	Brief tornado damaged a house and heavily damage two horse trailers, killing one of the horses inside. Fences and power poles were also damaged
Sources: NCDC Storm Data

=== August 19 event ===
List of reported tornadoes - Thursday, August 19, 2010
EF#	Location	County	Coord.	Time (UTC)	Path length	Comments/Damage
Michigan
EF1	NE of Utica	Macomb	42.66°N 82.97°W	2329	2 miles (3.2 km)	Several houses sustained roof damage. Trees and power lines were blown over.
EF0	Fraser	Macomb	42.58°N 82.91°W	2343	5 miles (8.0 km)	A few houses sustained minor damage and trees were knocked down.
Sources: NWS Detroit, NCDC Storm Data

=== August 20 event ===
List of reported tornadoes - Friday, August 20, 2010
EF#	Location	County	Coord.	Time (UTC)	Path length	Comments/Damage
Wisconsin
EF1	Greenleaf	Brown	44.31°N 88.10°W	1620	1 mile (1.6 km)	A barn was destroyed and a metal building was also damaged.
Sources: WLUK, NCDC Storm Data

=== August 22 event ===
List of reported tornadoes - Sunday, August 22, 2010
EF#	Location	County	Coord.	Time (UTC)	Path length	Comments/Damage
Pennsylvania
EF0	Chester	Delaware	39.84°N 75.37°W	1944	0.3 miles (480 m)	A few houses sustained minor damage and trees were knocked down by this brief tornado.
Sources: SPC Storm Reports for 08/22/10, NCDC Storm Data

=== August 30 event (West) ===
List of reported tornadoes - Monday, August 30, 2010
EF#	Location	County	Coord.	Time (UTC)	Path length	Comments/Damage
Wyoming
EF1	S of Ten Sleep	Washakie	43.97°N 107.48°W	1951	5 miles (8.0 km)	Several ranch buildings were destroyed and cottonwood trees were knocked down.
Sources: NCDC Storm Data

=== August 30 event (Southeast) ===
List of reported tornadoes - Monday, August 30, 2010
EF#	Location	County	Coord.	Time (UTC)	Path length	Comments/Damage
Florida
EF0	Key Largo	Monroe	25.08°N 80.42°W	2310	133 yards (120 m)	Brief waterspout made landfall with minimal damage.
Sources: NCDC Storm Data

== September ==
Confirmed tornadoes by Enhanced Fujita rating
EFU	EF0	EF1	EF2	EF3	EF4	EF5	Total
0	39	11	4	1	0	0	57

Note: 2 tornadoes were confirmed in the final totals, but do not have a listed rating.

=== September 1 event ===
List of reported tornadoes - Wednesday, September 1, 2010
EF#	Location	County	Coord.	Time (UTC)	Path length	Comments/Damage
Texas
EF0	Odessa	Ector	31.92°N 102.42°W	2115	unknown	Brief tornado with minimal damage, shaking pump jacks and throwing dumpsters.
South Dakota
EF0	W of Tulare (1st tornado)	Spink	44.73°N 98.62°W	0140	unknown	Brief tornado touchdown with no damage.
EF0	W of Tulare (2nd tornado)	Spink	44.73°N 98.58°W	0159	unknown	Brief tornado touchdown with no damage.
Sources: NCDC Storm Data

=== September 7 event ===
The events in Texas were associated with Tropical Storm Hermine.

List of reported tornadoes - Tuesday, September 7, 2010
EF#	Location	County	Coord.	Time (UTC)	Path length	Comments/Damage
Texas
EF0	Benbrook	Tarrant	32.68°N 97.45°W	1956	unknown	Tornado sighted over Benbrook Lake with no damage.
EF0	S of Moulton	Lavaca	29.56°N 97.15°W	2037	0.2 miles (320 m)	A roof was blown off an abandoned building and a tree was uprooted by this brief tornado.
Arkansas
EF0	ESE of Hope	Hempstead	33.64°N 93.54°W	2209	unknown	Brief tornado uprooted a large tree.
Sources: SPC Storm Reports for 09/07/10, NWS Fort Worth, NWS Austin/San Antonio, NCDC Storm Data

=== September 8 event ===
These events were associated with Tropical Storm Hermine.

List of reported tornadoes - Wednesday, September 8, 2010
EF#	Location	County	Coord.	Time (UTC)	Path length	Comments/Damage
Texas
EF0	WSW of Whitson	Coryell	31.31°N 97.47°W	0918	unknown	Brief tornado snapped and twisted a few trees.
EF0	NE of Blossom	Lamar	33.72°N 95.32°W	2220	2 miles (3.2 km)	A few houses were damaged and two barns were heavily damaged.
EF1	Seagoville area	Ellis, Dallas	32.58°N 96.59°W	2236	10 miles (16 km)	Three apartment buildings sustained significant roof damage and a few houses were damaged.
EF0	N of Perry	Falls	31.43°N 96.91°W	2255	1 mile (1.6 km)	Tornado remained over open country.
EF2	Central Dallas	Dallas	32.82°N 96.82°W	2310	3 miles (4.8 km)	Tornado touched down in an industrial area. A warehouse was heavily damaged and several other industrial buildings were damaged just outside downtown. First significant tornado in the city of Dallas since 1994.
EF0	NW of Heath	Rockwall	32.84°N 96.49°W	2320	1 mile (1.6 km)	Several brick houses sustained roof and chimney damage and many trees were damaged.
EF0	N of Lindsay	Cooke	33.68°N 97.23°W	0030	unknown	Brief tornado touchdown with no damage.
Oklahoma
EF1	Colbert	Bryan	33.86°N 96.50°W	1905	unknown	Several houses were damaged in the area and two trucks were overturned. One of the truck drivers was injured.
EF0	NW of Lone Grove	Carter	34.21°N 97.31°W	0000	unknown	Two houses sustained minor damage.
EF0	S of Marietta	Love	33.85°N 97.12°W	0115	unknown	Brief tornado touchdown with no damage.
Sources: NWS Fort Worth, NWS Norman, NCDC Storm Data

=== September 9 event ===
List of reported tornadoes - Thursday, September 9, 2010
EF#	Location	County	Coord.	Time (UTC)	Path length	Comments/Damage
North Dakota
EF0	N of Marmanth	Slope	46.48°N 103.87°W	2200	1 mile (1.6 km)	A small outbuilding was damaged and a few trees were knocked down.
Montana
EF0	SW of Harlowton	Wheatland	46.27°N 109.95°W	2220	unknown	Brief tornado touchdown with no damage.
Sources: NCDC Storm Data

=== September 13 event ===
List of reported tornadoes - Monday, September 13, 2010
EF#	Location	County	Coord.	Time (UTC)	Path length	Comments/Damage
Nebraska
EF0	SW of Thompson	Jefferson	40.05°N 97.25°W	2104	0.25 miles (400 m)	Brief tornado with damage limited to crops.
Sources: NCDC Storm Data

=== September 14 event ===
List of reported tornadoes - Tuesday, September 14, 2010
EF#	Location	County	Coord.	Time (UTC)	Path length	Comments/Damage
Kansas
EF0	N of Ruleton	Sherman	39.47°N 101.84°W	0205	3 miles (4.8 km)	Rain-wrapped cone tornado remained over open country.
EF0	NE of Brownville	Thomas	39.22°N 101.29°W	0335	1 mile (1.6 km)	Tornado remained over open country.
EF0	ESE of Brownville	Thomas	39.15°N 101.16°W	0355	1 mile (1.6 km)	Tornado remained over open country.
Sources: NCDC Storm Data

=== September 15 event ===
List of reported tornadoes - Wednesday, September 15, 2010
EF#	Location	County	Coord.	Time (UTC)	Path length	Comments/Damage
Texas
EF0	NE of Woodsboro	Refugio	28.23°N 97.35°W	1549	unknown	Brief tornado touchdown with no damage.
Kansas
EF0	W of Derby	Sedgwick	37.55°N 97.39°W	2328	unknown	Brief tornado touchdown with no damage.
EF0	E of Clearwater	Sedgwick	37.51°N 97.39°W	2334	unknown	Brief tornado touchdown with no damage.
EF0	E of Mulvane	Sedgwick	37.48°N 97.22°W	2352	unknown	Brief tornado touchdown with no damage.
EF0	NW of Severy	Greenwood	37.65°N 96.24°W	0002	unknown	Brief tornado touchdown with no damage.
EF0	NE of Severy	Greenwood	37.64°N 96.21°W	0017	unknown	Brief tornado touchdown with no damage.
EF0	N of Winfield	Cowley	37.38°N 96.97°W	0047	unknown	Brief tornado touchdown reported by a trained spotter with no damage.
EF0	NW of Burden	Cowley	37.33°N 96.87°W	0050	unknown	Brief rope tornado with no damage.
EF0	WSW of Burden	Cowley	37.30°N 96.86°W	0100	unknown	Brief rope tornado with no damage.
Missouri
EF0	WSW of Nixa	Christian	37.02°N 93.38°W	0350	0.5 miles (800 m)	Numerous trees were uprooted and branches and limbs were damaged.
Sources: SPC Storm Reports for 09/15/10, NWS Wichita, NWS Springfield, NCDC Storm Data

=== September 16 event ===
List of reported tornadoes - Thursday, September 16, 2010
EF#	Location	County	Coord.	Time (UTC)	Path length	Comments/Damage
Ohio
EF0	SW of Galena	Delaware	40.18°N 82.89°W	2038	0.25 miles (400 m)	Minor tree damage and a few shingles were removed from a house as a result of this brief tornado.
EF2	S of Wooster	Wayne	40.78°N 81.96°W	2126	11 miles (18 km)	Severe damage at the Ohio Agricultural Research and Development Center where greenhouses and a large brick laboratory building were destroyed and other buildings were heavily damaged. Over 150 houses and barns were also damaged, some significantly with a few destroyed. Numerous trees were snapped and uprooted and vehicles were flipped and tossed. One person was injured.
EF2	S of Somerset	Fairfield, Perry	39.81°N 82.30°W	2152	11 miles (18 km)	Two houses were destroyed and many others were damaged, some heavily. Major damage to hundreds of trees and to power lines and poles. One person was injured. Damage also occurred in West Rushville.
EF1	Tarlton	Fairfield, Pickaway	39.57°N 82.86°W	2156	2.85 miles (4.59 km)	Two grain silos were thrown and several houses were damaged. Extensive tree damage occurred along the path and a semi-trailer was pushed over.
EF1	SW of Farmerstown	Holmes	40.45°N 81.75°W	2200	3 miles (4.8 km)	A few houses were damaged and barns and outbuildings were destroyed along the path.
EF1	SW of Buena Vista	Hocking	39.53°N 82.67°W	2209	1 mile (1.6 km)	A pole barn lost its roof and a house sustained minor damage.
EF1	New Philadelphia area	Tuscarawas	40.49°N 81.53°W	2220	5 miles (8.0 km)	Several houses sustained minor damage and outbuildings were destroyed. Many trees were also uprooted.
EF1	Crooksville area	Perry, Morgan	39.77°N 82.09°W	2221	5 miles (8.0 km)	Several houses were damaged and sheds, barns and outbuildings were destroyed.
EF2	S of Nelsonville	Athens	39.39°N 82.23°W	2254	3 miles (4.8 km)	Severe damage in the area, with 13 houses and many mobile homes destroyed and dozens of other houses damaged, some heavily. Many trees were uprooted or snapped. 7 people were injured.
EF3	Reedsville area	Meigs, Wood (WV)	39.15°N 81.75°W	0000	9 miles (14 km)	1 death - Severe damage on both sides of the Ohio River. Over 50 houses were damaged or destroyed with at least 2 that were completely leveled. Numerous mobile homes and farm buildings were damaged or destroyed. Mobile home frames were found wrapped around tree stumps. Extensive tree damage occurred and vehicles were tossed and destroyed. 16 others were injured, some seriously.
New York
EF0	Park Slope	Kings	40.67°N 73.99°W	2133	2 miles (3.2 km)	Weak tornado touchdown embedded in a larger macroburst. Direct tornado damage limited to trees, some which landed on and destroyed vehicles.
EF1	Flushing	Queens	40.74°N 73.84°W	2142	4 miles (6.4 km)	1 death - Many trees were knocked down including one falling onto a car killing one person driving along Grand Central Parkway. Several houses and businesses were also damaged, and many windows were blown out. One other person was injured and one indirect death was also reported.
New Jersey
EF1	Woodruff	Ocean	40.06°N 74.49°W	2205	2.2 miles (3.5 km)	Two houses sustained major roof damage. A small barn was also destroyed and over 300 trees were blown down.
West Virginia
EF1	SE of Palestine	Wirt	39.06°N 81.34°W	0025	1 mile (1.6 km)	Significant tree damage with some falling on houses and outbuildings.
Sources: SPC Storm Reports for 09/16/10, NWS Wilmington OH, NWS Cleveland, NWS Pittsburgh, NWS Philadelphia, NWS Charleston, WV, NWS New York City (PNS), NCDC Storm Data

=== September 21 event ===
List of reported tornadoes - Tuesday, September 21, 2010
EF#	Location	County	Coord.	Time (UTC)	Path length	Comments/Damage
Wisconsin
EF0	SE of Janesville	Rock	42.55°N 89.00°W	2100	0.4 miles (640 m)	Brief narrow tornado damaged an antenna and a few trees.
Sources: NCDC Storm Data

=== September 22 event ===
List of reported tornadoes - Wednesday, September 22, 2010
EF#	Location	County	Coord.	Time (UTC)	Path length	Comments/Damage
Ohio
EF0	ESE of Bexley	Franklin	39.98°N 82.85°W	2058	unknown	Tornado sighted on a traffic camera along Interstate 270 with no damage.
Sources: SPC Storm Reports for 09/22/10, NCDC Storm Data

=== September 25 event ===
List of reported tornadoes - Saturday, September 25, 2010
EF#	Location	County	Coord.	Time (UTC)	Path length	Comments/Damage
Kansas
EF0	E of Buttermilk	Comanche	37.10°N 99.26°W	2149	unknown	Brief landspout tornado with no damage.
Sources: NCDC Storm Data

=== September 27 event ===
List of reported tornadoes - Monday, September 27, 2010
EF#	Location	County	Coord.	Time (UTC)	Path length	Comments/Damage
Virginia
EF0	N of Kendall Grove	Northampton	37.38°N 75.91°W	1840	unknown	Brief tornado blew over a shed and damaged a mobile home. One person was injured.
Pennsylvania
EF0	New London Twp	Chester	39.79°N 75.88°W	1900	1.4 miles (2.3 km)	A few houses sustained minor damage. Numerous trees were snapped or uprooted.
EF0	E of Paradise	Lancaster	40.00°N 76.08°W	1910	2 miles (3.2 km)	Several farm buildings were damaged and trees were snapped. One person who was nearby was injured.
Georgia
EF0	ESE of Chappell Mill	Laurens	32.63°N 83.02°W	2234	200 yards (180 m)	Brief tornado knocked down a few trees, some landing on a house and a shed with minor damage.
North Carolina
EF1	SW of Morganton	Burke	35.70°N 81.75°W	0313	3 miles (4.8 km)	Several houses sustained structural damage, including one that lost its roof.
Sources: SPC Storm Reports for 09/27/10, NWS Philadelphia, NWS Greenville/Spartanburg

=== September 30 event ===
List of reported tornadoes - Thursday, September 30, 2010
EF#	Location	County	Coord.	Time (UTC)	Path length	Comments/Damage
Maryland
EF0	E of Pasadena	Anne Arundel	39.10°N 76.44°W	1346	1 mile (1.6 km)	Several large trees were knocked down and a sailboat was thrown onto its side.
Sources: NWS Baltimore/Washington, NCDC Storm Data

== See also ==
- Tornadoes of 2010
- List of United States tornadoes in July 2010
- List of United States tornadoes in October 2010
