= List of United States tornadoes in July 2010 =

This is a list of all tornadoes that were confirmed by local offices of the National Weather Service in the United States in July 2010.

== United States yearly total ==
Confirmed tornadoes by Enhanced Fujita rating
EFU	EF0	EF1	EF2	EF3	EF4	EF5	Total
0	768	342	127	32	13	0	1,282

== July ==
Confirmed tornadoes by Enhanced Fujita rating
EFU	EF0	EF1	EF2	EF3	EF4	EF5	Total
0	83	36	9	1	0	0	129

=== July 1 event ===
- These tornadoes were associated with Hurricane Alex.

List of reported tornadoes - Thursday, July 1, 2010
EF#	Location	County	Coord.	Time (UTC)	Path length	Comments/Damage
Texas
EF0	S of Rockport	Aransas	28.00°N 97.07°W	1420	unknown	Brief tornado blew out windows at a business.
EF0	NNW of Kingsville	Kleberg	27.62°N 98.05°W	2310	unknown	Brief tornado touchdown with no damage.
Sources: NWS Corpus Christi, NCDC Storm Data

=== July 2 event (South) ===
- This tornado was associated with remnant moisture from Hurricane Alex.

List of reported tornadoes - Friday, July 2, 2010
EF#	Location	County	Coord.	Time (UTC)	Path length	Comments/Damage
Texas
EF1	Hebbronville	Jim Hogg	27.32°N 98.69°W	2209	2 miles (3.2 km)	A TXDOT maintenance yard was heavily damaged. Several mobile homes and businesses were also damaged, and numerous trees were knocked down.
Sources: NWS Brownsville, NCDC Storm Data

=== July 2 event (North) ===
List of reported tornadoes - Friday, July 2, 2010
EF#	Location	County	Coord.	Time (UTC)	Path length	Comments/Damage
Montana
EF2	NE of Wilsall	Park	46.16°N 110.43°W	2209	2 miles (3.2 km)	Thousands of large trees were snapped or uprooted in a forested area. Tornado embedded in a larger microburst.
Sources: NCDC Storm Data

=== July 3 event ===
List of reported tornadoes - Saturday, July 3, 2010
EF#	Location	County	Coord.	Time (UTC)	Path length	Comments/Damage
Nebraska
EF0	SSE of Rushville	Sheridan	42.65°N 102.40°W	2240	unknown	Brief tornado touchdown with no damage.
Oklahoma
EF0	WSW of Bridgeport	Caddo	35.53°N 98.40°W	2245	unknown	Brief tornado touchdown with no damage.
Sources: NWS Topeka, NCDC Storm Data

=== July 4 event ===
List of reported tornadoes - Sunday, July 4, 2010
EF#	Location	County	Coord.	Time (UTC)	Path length	Comments/Damage
Wyoming
EF0	E of Chugwater	Platte	41.75°N 104.71°W	2006	1 mile (1.6 km)	Tornado remained over open range land.
EF0	NNE of Horse Creek	Laramie	41.62°N 105.07°W	2024	unknown	Brief tornado touchdown with no damage.
EF0	E of Cheyenne	Laramie	41.12°N 104.68°W	2138	unknown	Brief tornado reported at Exit 370 on Interstate 90 with debris.
Kansas
EF0	S of Mayetta	Jackson	39.30°N 95.72°W	2146	2 miles (3.2 km)	A camper rolled over along U.S. Route 75. One house sustained minor damage and a metal barn was destroyed.
EF0	W of Richland	Shawnee	38.87°N 95.57°W	0005	unknown	A small outbuilding and a few trees were damaged by this brief tornado.
Nebraska
EF0	N of Bushnell	Kimball	41.32°N 103.90°W	2309	1 mile (1.6 km)	Tornado reported by spotter with no damage.
EF0	SW of Bushnell	Kimball	41.13°N 104.02°W	2325	1 mile (1.6 km)	Narrow tornado reported by spotter with no damage.
Colorado
EF1	NE of Karval	Lincoln	38.77°N 103.47°W	0315	unknown	Brief tornado destroyed a garage and damaged a few trees.
Sources: NWS Topeka, NCDC Storm Data

=== July 6 event (South) ===
List of reported tornadoes - Tuesday, July 6, 2010
EF#	Location	County/ Parish	Coord.	Time (UTC)	Path length	Comments/Damage
Louisiana
EF0	New Orleans	Orleans	30.02°N 90.06°W	1444	unknown	Brief tornado in the Gentilly district. Minor damage to one house and a few trees were knocked down.
Sources: NCDC Storm Data

=== July 6 event (North) ===
List of reported tornadoes - Tuesday, July 6, 2010
EF#	Location	County	Coord.	Time (UTC)	Path length	Comments/Damage
South Dakota
EF0	SSW of Pukwana	Brule	43.68°N 99.22°W	2121	unknown	Brief tornado captured on videotape with no damage.
EF0	E of Eagle	Brule	43.55°N 98.92°W	2248	1 mile (1.6 km)	Intermittent tornado touchdown with no damage.
EF0	ESE of Eagle	Brule	43.50°N 98.83°W	2328	1 mile (1.6 km)	Intermittent rain-wrapped tornado touchdown with no damage.
EF0	N of Joubert	Douglas	43.48°N 98.69°W	0000	1 mile (1.6 km)	Rain-wrapped tornado with no damage.
EF0	ENE of Harrison	Douglas	43.44°N 98.46°W	0025	1 mile (1.6 km)	Rain-wrapped tornado with no damage.
Nebraska
EF0	S of Potter	Cheyenne	41.10°N 103.30°W	2306	1 mile (1.6 km)	Tornado remained over open country.
Sources: NCDC Storm Data

=== July 7 event ===
List of reported tornadoes - Wednesday, July 7, 2010
EF#	Location	County	Coord.	Time (UTC)	Path length	Comments/Damage
Wisconsin
EF1	S of Cambria	Columbia	43.53°N 89.10°W	2327	4 miles (6.4 km)	A barn and a pole shed were destroyed, crops were flattened and trees were uprooted.
Kansas
EF0	NE of Carbondale	Osage	38.82°N 95.62°W	2355	unknown	Brief landspout tornado with no damage.
Sources: NWS Milwaukee, NCDC Storm Data

=== July 10 event ===
List of reported tornadoes - Saturday, July 10, 2010
EF#	Location	County	Coord.	Time (UTC)	Path length	Comments/Damage
Minnesota
EF0	N of Hoffman	Grant	45.87°N 95.78°W	2236	unknown	Brief tornado touchdown with no damage.
EF0	S of Gilchrist	Pope	45.46°N 95.24°W	0115	2 miles (3.2 km)	Many trees were knocked down, a few of which landed on cottages damaging them. Several sheds and campers were destroyed.
Sources: NCDC Storm Data

=== July 11 event ===
List of reported tornadoes - Sunday, July 11, 2010
EF#	Location	County	Coord.	Time (UTC)	Path length	Comments/Damage
Arkansas
EF0	W of Slovak	Prairie	34.63°N 91.63°W	2243	unknown	A few trees were snapped and a boat house and doghouse were damaged.
South Carolina
EF0	W of Woodroe	Lee, Sumter	34.11°N 80.38°W	2339	7 miles (11 km)	Intermittent tornado touchdown with damage to trees and power lines.
Sources: NCDC Storm Data

=== July 12 event ===
List of reported tornadoes - Monday, July 12, 2010
EF#	Location	County	Coord.	Time (UTC)	Path length	Comments/Damage
South Carolina
EF0	NE of Lancaster	Lancaster	34.78°N 80.61°W	1857	2 miles (3.2 km)	About 25 houses sustained minor damage.
EF0	SSE of Catawba	Lancaster	34.79°N 80.87°W	2012	2 miles (3.2 km)	Several trees were knocked down.
EF1	W of Oakland	Sumter	33.99°N 80.54°W	2035	3 miles (4.8 km)	Minor damage to about 12 houses and numerous trees were knocked down.
Illinois
EF0	NNW of Rock Grove	Stephenson	42.48°N 89.52°W	2003	unknown	Brief tornado touchdown with no damage.
Missouri
EF0	N of Lamar	Barton	37.53°N 94.26°W	2047	0.25 miles (400 m)	Brief tornado uprooted two trees.
North Dakota
EF0	N of Manitou	Mountrail	48.37°N 102.62°W	0116	1 mile (1.6 km)	Tornado remained in open country.
Kansas
EF1	ESE of Melrose	Cherokee	37.03°N 94.94°W	0125	3 miles (4.8 km)	Two grain bins and two outbuildings were heavily damaged. One house sustained minor damage.
Sources: SPC Storm Reports for 07/12/10, NWS Springfield, NWS Columbia, NCDC Storm Data

=== July 13 event ===
List of reported tornadoes - Tuesday, July 13, 2010
EF#	Location	County	Coord.	Time (UTC)	Path length	Comments/Damage
North Carolina
EF1	N of Kidville	Lincoln	35.51°N 81.06°W	2050	3 miles (4.8 km)	Intermittent tornado touchdown with significant damage to several houses. Many trees were also knocked down.
EF1	ESE of Denver	Lincoln	35.52°N 81.00°W	2059	unknown	Brief tornado knocked down many trees, some of which significantly damaged houses.
Minnesota
EF0	W of Felton	Clay	47.07°N 96.65°W	0108	unknown	Brief tornado with debris spotted from the KVLY-TV Tower but no damage.
EF0	Dent	Otter Tail	46.55°N 95.72°W	0309	unknown	Brief tornado touchdown with no damage.
Sources: NCDC Storm Data

=== July 14 event ===
List of reported tornadoes - Wednesday, July 14, 2010
EF#	Location	County	Coord.	Time (UTC)	Path length	Comments/Damage
Pennsylvania
EF0	New Tripoli	Lehigh	40.68°N 75.75°W	0800	2 miles (3.2 km)	Several houses and many trees were damaged in the area.
Wisconsin
EF1	N of Hammond	St. Croix	44.98°N 92.48°W	1554	2.5 miles (4.0 km)	30 houses were damaged, including one which had its roof taken off. Sheds and outbuildings were destroyed.
EF2	N of Beldenville	Pierce	44.77°N 92.68°W	1954	15 miles (24 km)	Several houses sustained structural damage and barns and sheds were destroyed.
EF0	WNW of Boyceville	Dunn	45.09°N 92.08°W	2006	0.5 miles (800 m)	Several trees were snapped.
EF2	SE of El Paso	Pierce	44.76°N 92.34°W	2008	6 miles (9.7 km)	Two barns and many sheds and outbuildings were destroyed and hundreds of trees were snapped or uprooted.
EF1	Merrillan area	Jackson, Clark	44.48°N 90.97°W	2116	31 miles (50 km)	Long track intermittent tornado with extensive tree damage and several buildings damaged along the track.
EF0	W of Pittsville	Wood	44.40°N 90.21°W	2218	unknown	Brief tornado knocked down a few trees and snapped branches, with some falling on a house which sustained minor damage.
Minnesota
EF0	NW of Northfield	Dakota	44.47°N 93.17°W	1920	3.5 miles (5.6 km)	Tornado touched down along Interstate 35 flipping a small truck. A small shed was damaged and many trees were uprooted.
EF0	N of Northfield	Dakota	44.55°N 93.13°W	1932	unknown	Brief tornado with minor tree damage.
EF1	SW of Randolph	Dakota	44.58°N 93.09°W	1936	1.6 miles (2.6 km)	One house on a farm sustained minor damage. A metal shed was blown away and a camper was destroyed. Trees were also uprooted and corn stalks were flattened.
EF0	ESE of Cloverdale	Pine	45.98°N 92.62°W	2315	unknown	Brief tornado touchdown with no damage.
Sources: SPC Storm Reports for 07/13/10, SPC Storm Reports for 07/14/10, NWS Twin Cities, NWS La Crosse, Wisconsin Tornado List, NCDC Storm Data

=== July 15 event ===
List of reported tornadoes - Thursday, July 15, 2010
EF#	Location	County	Coord.	Time (UTC)	Path length	Comments/Damage
Colorado
EF0	SSE of Eads	Kiowa	38.35°N 102.73°W	0123	1 mile (1.6 km)	Tornado remained over open country.
EF0	N of Lamar	Prowers	38.10°N 102.62°W	0155	unknown	Brief tornado knocked down the KLMR radio tower.
Sources: NCDC Storm Data

=== July 16 event ===
List of reported tornadoes - Friday, July 16, 2010
EF#	Location	County	Coord.	Time (UTC)	Path length	Comments/Damage
Iowa
EF0	SE of Klemme	Hancock	42.97°N 93.52°W	0145	unknown	Brief tornado touchdown with no damage.
EF0	W of Chapin	Franklin	42.87°N 93.38°W	0222	1 mile (1.6 km)	Brief tornado touchdown with no damage.
Sources: NCDC Storm Data

=== July 17 event ===
List of reported tornadoes - Saturday, July 17, 2010
EF#	Location	County	Coord.	Time (UTC)	Path length	Comments/Damage
Minnesota
EF0	NE of Little Rock	Morrison	45.84°N 94.04°W	2350	1 mile (1.6 km)	One house sustained minor damage and two sheds and a barn were heavily damaged.
EF0	WSW of Waite Park	Stearns	45.54°N 94.23°W	0030	unknown	A few trees were toppled and several houses sustained minor damage.
EF0	S of Clearwater	Wright	45.35°N 94.06°W	0048	4 miles (6.4 km)	Minor damage to one house and sheds and outbuildings were destroyed. Hundreds of trees were also snapped.
EF0	SSW of Currant Lake	Murray	44.06°N 95.99°W	0122	1 mile (1.6 km)	Tornado remained over open country.
EF0	NW of Scandia	Washington	45.24°N 92.94°W	0144	5 miles (8.0 km)	Extensive tree damage with hundreds of trees toppled, some of which damaged houses or sheds.
Nebraska
EF0	S of North Platte	Lincoln	41.08°N 100.77°W	0123	unknown	Brief tornado touchdown with no damage.
Sources: NCDC Storm Data

=== July 18 event ===
List of reported tornadoes - Sunday, July 18, 2010
EF#	Location	County	Coord.	Time (UTC)	Path length	Comments/Damage
Michigan
EF0	NE of Wayland	Allegan	42.73°N 85.53°W	2008	0.34 miles (550 m)	A house, a barn and a chicken coop were damaged. Tree damage also reported.
EF0	S of Cadillac	Wexford	44.20°N 85.41°W	2256	100 yards (90 m)	Brief tornado damaged a building at a lumber yard.
EF0	E of Huron City	Huron	44.02°N 82.80°W	0211	2 miles (3.2 km)	One house sustained roof damaged and numerous trees were knocked down, some landing on a camper.
Wisconsin
EF0	N of Howards Grove	Sheboygan	43.84°N 87.81°W	2021	3 miles (4.8 km)	A trailer and an SUV were flipped on Interstate 43. Intermittent tree damage also reported along its path.
Colorado
EF0	WNW of Fleming	Logan	40.70°N 102.92°W	2345	unknown	Brief tornado touchdown with no damage.
Sources: NWS Gaylord, NWS Detroit, NWS Grand Rapids, NCDC Storm Data

=== July 19 event ===
List of reported tornadoes - Monday, July 19, 2010
EF#	Location	County	Coord.	Time (UTC)	Path length	Comments/Damage
Missouri
EF0	E of Princeton	Mercer	40.40°N 93.47°W	0226	unknown	Brief tornado destroyed a shed.
EF0	Harris	Sullivan	40.32°N 93.35°W	0242	unknown	Brief tornado removed a roof from a house.
EF0	SW of Milan	Sullivan	40.16°N 93.15°W	0322	unknown	Brief tornado blew a roof off a garage.
Sources: NCDC Storm Data

=== July 20 event ===
List of reported tornadoes - Tuesday, July 20, 2010
EF#	Location	County	Coord.	Time (UTC)	Path length	Comments/Damage
Missouri
EF0	SW of Mexico	Audrain	39.13°N 91.81°W	1215	1 mile (1.6 km)	A shed was destroyed and numerous trees were snapped or uprooted.
North Carolina
EF0	N of Elizabeth City	Pasquotank	36.37°N 76.30°W	2115	unknown	Very brief tornado reported on U.S. Route 17 with no damage.
Indiana
EF0	SE of Trafalgar	Johnson	39.39°N 86.12°W	2327	2 miles (3.2 km)	Several trees were snapped and a shed was damaged.
Sources: NWS Indianapolis

=== July 21 event ===
List of reported tornadoes - Wednesday, July 21, 2010
EF#	Location	County	Coord.	Time (UTC)	Path length	Comments/Damage
Illinois
EF0	N of Sidell	Vermilion	39.92°N 87.82°W	1824	unknown	Brief tornado touchdown with no damage.
Connecticut
EF1	NNW of East Litchfield	Litchfield	41.74°N 73.19°W	1951	0.25 miles (400 m)	Damage mostly to trees along the path.
EF1	N of Thomaston	Litchfield	41.69°N 73.07°W	1955	unknown	Damage mostly to trees along the path.
EF1	NW of Thomaston	Litchfield	41.67°N 73.05°W	1958	200 yards (180 m)	Damage mostly to trees along the path.
EF1	Terryville	Litchfield	41.67°N 73.05°W	2005	200 yards (180 m)	A gas station sustained minor damage.
EF1	Bristol	Hartford	41.68°N 72.94°W	2015	1.5 miles (2.4 km)	Several trees were uprooted or snapped. A few houses sustained minor damage.
Maine
EF1	Newfield	York	43.65°N 70.83°W	2215	2 miles (3.2 km)	Several houses and buildings were damaged and many trees were snapped or uprooted.
EF1	Gorham area	York, Cumberland	43.68°N 70.51°W	2248	5 miles (8.0 km)	Thousands of trees were snapped or uprooted. A few houses were damaged, along with power lines and vehicles, primarily from the fallen trees.
EF1	E of Emery Mills	York	43.49°N 70.79°W	2324	5.4 miles (8.7 km)	Many trees and power lines were damaged. Several houses were also damaged, mostly from fallen trees.
Sources: NWS Albany, NWS Boston, NWS Gray, NCDC Storm Data

=== July 22 event ===
List of reported tornadoes - Thursday, July 22, 2010
EF#	Location	County	Coord.	Time (UTC)	Path length	Comments/Damage
Iowa
EF1	S of Pocahontas	Pocahontas	42.71°N 94.68°W	0738	2.6 miles (4.2 km)	A barn and a farm business were heavily damaged. Trees were also uprooted in a cemetery.
Indiana
EF0	S of Greenwood	Johnson	39.56°N 86.18°W	1825	1 mile (1.6 km)	Landspout tornado damaged crops, trees and roofing off sheds.
Wisconsin
EF1	N of Dane	Dane	43.26°N 89.51°W	2108	2 miles (3.2 km)	Trees, power lines and crops were damaged by the tornado.
EF0	E of East Bristol	Dane	43.27°N 89.07°W	2124	2 miles (3.2 km)	Minor damage to corn and tree limbs.
EF0	S of Waterloo	Dane	43.14°N 89.02°W	2210	6 miles (9.7 km)	Intermittent tornado touchdown with damage limited to trees.
EF0	SE of Farmington	Jefferson	43.05°N 88.65°W	2235	0.1 miles (160 m)	Brief tornado confirmed by storm spotters with no damage.
EF1	W of Albion	Dane	42.91°N 89.16°W	2302	4 miles (6.4 km)	A barn was destroyed and numerous trees were damaged.
EF0	SW of Fort Atkinson	Jefferson	42.87°N 88.93°W	2322	2.7 miles (4.3 km)	Damage primarily to tree limbs.
EF0	S of Cold Spring	Jefferson	42.90°N 88.80°W	2338	4 miles (6.4 km)	Damage primarily to tree limbs.
EF1	SE of Mount Horeb	Dane	42.91°N 89.16°W	2352	1.3 miles (2.1 km)	One house sustained minor damage, and numerous trees were damaged.
EF2	SE of Big Bend	Waukesha	42.84°N 88.18°W	0002	1 mile (1.6 km)	A garage and a pole barn were destroyed with heavy sheet metal moved. A camping trailer was also rolled.
EF0	SE of Verona	Dane	42.97°N 89.52°W	0010	0.22 miles (0.35 km)	Brief tornado with damage limited to a few tree limbs.
Michigan
EF0	SW of Coldwater	Branch	41.94°N 85.00°W	2145	650 yards (590 m)	Intermittent tornado touchdown with damage on a farm, including a chicken coop destroyed and a house and barn damaged.
EF0	NNW of Bloomingdale	Allegan	41.94°N 85.00°W	0223	0.16 miles (260 m)	Brief tornado touchdown with no damage.
Minnesota
EF1	S of Brandon	Douglas	45.90°N 95.56°W	0105	1 mile (1.6 km)	A barn, three sheds, a rabbit house and two grain bins were destroyed in several farms.
Sources: SPC Storm Reports for 07/22/10, NWS Des Moines, NWS Milwaukee, NWS Northern Indiana, NCDC Storm Data

=== July 23 event ===
List of reported tornadoes - Friday, July 23, 2010
EF#	Location	County	Coord.	Time (UTC)	Path length	Comments/Damage
Pennsylvania
EF1	Pleasant Mount area	Susquehanna	41.71°N 75.46°W	2155	7 miles (11 km)	A barn and a construction trailer were destroyed and several other barns and outbuildings were damaged. Extensive tree damage along the path.
EF2	Honesdale area	Wayne	41.64°N 75.33°W	2215	17 miles (27 km)	Several structures were heavily damaged or destroyed, including a commercial building and a large mobile home. Severe damage to trees.
EF1	NW of Bethany	Wayne	41.63°N 75.31°W	2215	2 miles (3.2 km)	A barn roof was peeled and trees were damaged.
EF1	Hawley area	Wayne, Pike	41.53°N 75.19°W	2235	4 miles (6.4 km)	Extensive tree damage in the area, including trees falling on and destroying a house. Track length uncertain due to mountainous terrain and the fact the tornado was embedded in a larger microburst.
Michigan
EF0	SW of Willis	Washtenaw	42.14°N 83.60°W	2233	0.6 miles (970 m)	
South Dakota
EF0	W of Vivian	Lyman	43.92°N 100.30°W	2257	unknown	Brief tornado touchdown with no damage.
EF0	S of Doland	Spink	44.81°N 98.10°W	0050	2 miles (3.2 km)	Minor damage to trees and a farm house.
EF0	ESE of Eagle	Brule	43.52°N 98.80°W	0052	unknown	Brief tornado touchdown with no damage.
EF0	NNW of Bonesteel	Gregory	43.16°N 99.00°W	0055	unknown	Brief rope tornado with no damage.
EF0	ENE of Herrick	Gregory	43.15°N 99.10°W	0058	unknown	Brief tornado touchdown with no damage.
Iowa
EF1	SE of Spring Hill	Warren	41.36°N 93.64°W	0103	3 miles (4.8 km)	Numerous barns and houses were damaged.
EF1	SE of Beech	Warren	41.37°N 93.52°W	0112	unknown	Brief tornado damaged several houses.
Sources: NWS Binghamton, NWS Detroit, NWS Aberdeen, NCDC Storm Data

=== July 24 event ===
List of reported tornadoes - Saturday, July 24, 2010
EF#	Location	County	Coord.	Time (UTC)	Path length	Comments/Damage
New York
EF2	Mayville area	Chautauqua	42.24°N 79.59°W	2040	6.5 miles (10.5 km)	Significant damage in the community, with numerous houses and businesses and three condominium buildings heavily damaged. Some of the debris blew into Chautauqua Lake.
EF2	Randolph area	Cattaraugus	42.16°N 79.02°W	2125	7 miles (11 km)	Many houses in the village were damaged with some destroyed and a gas station was also destroyed. Several minor injuries were reported.
EF1	Great Valley	Cattaraugus	42.21°N 78.64°W	2125	1.2 miles (1.9 km)	Damage reported to trees and wires.
EF1	Allegany area	Cattaraugus	42.11°N 78.66°W	2149	7 miles (11 km)	Damage mainly to a large number of trees. A few houses sustained minor damage.
Pennsylvania
EF1	SW of Galeton	Potter	41.72°N 77.64°W	2305	1 mile (1.6 km)	About 1,500 trees were snapped or uprooted by the tornado.A few cabins sustained minor damage.
Sources: NWS Buffalo, NWS State College, NCDC Storm Data

=== July 25 event ===
List of reported tornadoes - Sunday, July 25, 2010
EF#	Location	County	Coord.	Time (UTC)	Path length	Comments/Damage
New York
EF1	Bronx	Bronx	40.91°N 73.91°W	1850	0.6 miles (970 m)	See article on this tornado – Seven people were injured; one indirect fatality was also confirmed.
Sources: NWS New York

=== July 26 event ===
List of reported tornadoes - Monday, July 26, 2010
EF#	Location	County	Coord.	Time (UTC)	Path length	Comments/Damage
Utah
EF0	S of Wellington	Carbon	39.53°N 110.76°W	0100	unknown	A few large trees and a trailer were damaged.
North Dakota
EF0	N of Amidon	Slope	46.62°N 103.43°W	2338	5 miles (8.0 km)	Tornado remained over open country.
EF0	SE of Coteau	Burke	48.68°N 102.23°W	2350	1 mile (1.6 km)	Tornado remained over open country.
EF0	S of Balfour	McHenry	47.94°N 100.54°W	0113	3 miles (4.8 km)	Damage limited to an outbuilding.
EF0	SSW of Hesper	Benson	47.95°N 99.63°W	0310	unknown	Brief tornado touchdown with no damage.
EF2	Sibley area	Barnes, Cass	47.19°N 98.18°W	0530	18 miles (29 km)	Several farm buildings, including barns and grain bins, were destroyed. Heavy damage to farm equipment.
Tennessee
EF1	Nashville	Davidson	36.25°N 86.77°W	0005	0.5 miles (800 m)	12 houses were damaged in the northern part of Nashville, mostly roof damage. Tornado embedded in a larger microburst.
Montana
EF3	SE of Redstone	Sheridan	48.60°N 104.85°W	0100	18 miles (29 km)	2 deaths - Severe damage at a ranch where a ranch house was destroyed, along with cars and farming equipment which were thrown and mangled. An abandoned house was pushed off of its foundation as well. Two people were killed and one other person was injured. Grain bins were torn from their foundations and thrown, and several farm buildings were destroyed. Power poles were snapped, and a wooden road bridge was destroyed as well.
North Carolina
EF0	Lowgap	Surry	36.48°N 80.84°W	0138	1.8 miles (2.9 km)	Two structures sustained minor roof damage and trees were damaged.
Sources: NWS Glasgow, NWS Nashville, NWS Blacksburg, NWS Grand Forks, NCDC Storm Data

=== July 27 event ===
List of reported tornadoes - Tuesday, July 27, 2010
EF#	Location	County	Coord.	Time (UTC)	Path length	Comments/Damage
North Dakota
EF0	W of Kindred	Cass	46.65°N 97.11°W	1340	5 miles (8.0 km)	Three farm houses sustained significant damage.
Wisconsin
EF2	Morse area	Ashland	46.22°N 90.63°W	2321	1 mile (1.6 km)	Many trees were damaged by the tornado in a heavily forested area.
EF0	NE of Butternut	Ashland	46.10°N 90.38°W	0012	2 miles (3.2 km)	Some tree damage was confirmed.
EF1	SW of Mercer	Iron	46.08°N 90.18°W	0020	4.8 miles (7.7 km)	Extensive tree damage along Turtle-Flambeau Flowage. Some of the trees heavily damaged cottages. Three people were injured.
Michigan
EF0	Norway	Dickinson	45.79°N 87.87°W	0134	0.33 miles (530 m)	Several trees and limbs were damaged in the community with minor damage to structures from falling trees.
EF0	NE of Vulcan	Dickinson	45.78°N 87.84°W	0140	0.25 miles (400 m)	Brief tornado with minor tree damage.
Sources: NWS Duluth, NWS Marquette, NCDC Storm Data

=== July 29 event ===
List of reported tornadoes - Thursday, July 29, 2010
EF#	Location	County	Coord.	Time (UTC)	Path length	Comments/Damage
Arizona
EF1	E of Wintersburg	Maricopa	33.42°N 112.82°W	0010	1 mile (1.6 km)	One house was destroyed, injuring an occupant.
Sources: SPC Storm Reports for 07/29/10, NCDC Storm Data

=== July 31 event ===
List of reported tornadoes - Saturday, July 31, 2010
EF#	Location	County	Coord.	Time (UTC)	Path length	Comments/Damage
North Dakota
EF0	SE of Concrete	Pembina	48.74°N 97.92°W	2343	7 miles (11 km)	Damage mostly to trees.
Sources: SPC Storm Reports for 07/31/10, NWS Grand Forks, NCDC Storm Data

== See also ==
- Tornadoes of 2010
- List of United States tornadoes in June 2010
- List of United States tornadoes from August to September 2010
