= Ernest Cromwell Peake =

Ernest Cromwell Peake (18 August 1874 – 24 December 1950) was an English Missionary of the London Missionary Society who worked in China, from 1899 to 1922. He was the first medical missionary to work in Hengzhou (also spelled Hengchow, modern Hengyang), in Hunan Province, China where he set up a clinic and dispensary. He was also appointed head of the Mackenzie Memorial Hospital in Tianjin, China in 1912. Peake was known for teaching Chinese locals about medicine, and for being one of the first missionaries to bring modern medical techniques to China. He was the father of Mervyn Peake, the writer and poet.

== Background and early life ==
Ernest Cromwell Peake was born on 18 August 1874 in the tropics of Madagascar. He was one of five children born to the two English missionaries, Phillip George Peake and Emilia Charlotte Scheiterberg. He was educated as a boarder at an English mission college, and proceeded to study medicine at Edinburgh University where he graduated in 1898 as M.B., Ch.B. In July 1903 at Guling (then spelling "Kuling" by Europeans, named as a pun on the English word "cooling"), a summer European missionary resort in Mount Lu about the Yangtze River in Jiujiang, Peake met his soon to be wife Amanda Elizabeth Powell who had been in China since 1901. They got married in Hong Kong in December of that same year. His wife played the role as his assistant, and he described her as a small dark lively Welsh girl who sang and played the piano. They had two sons together while they were in China, Ernest Leslie Peake and Mervyn Peake.

== Missionary journey ==
In 1899, Peake was sent to the prefecture of Hengzhou, Hunan located in inland China, by the London Missionary Society, a non-denominational missionary society, which was founded in 1795. Upon arrival, Peake was the only white doctor in the large hostile city, home to 200,000 people. When in Hengzhou, Peake learned the native language with the help of a local tutor. From 1904 through 1912, Peake ran the only European hospital in Hengzhou.

He inhabited China for 12 years, and at that time he faced obstacles due to the natural, cultural, and political environment change. While in China, Peake faced extreme heat and humidity that his European blood was not accustomed to. In order to escape the elements, he climbed Mount Lu above Jiujiang. Culturally, Peake faced hostility, towards both himself and Western techniques, by the natives. However, while the citizens were not initially accepting, the Chinese government did approve of the London Missionary Society, and missionary efforts. Certain Chinese officials encouraged the adoption of Western culture. For example, daotai (circuit intendant) Tan Chi-shwei was a progressive man who invited foreign missionaries to dine and stay in the capital. One evening, he had members of the London Missionary Society and the American Presbyterian Mission over to the capital for a feast in which he mimicked the American style. The daotai remarked that the American dining style saved so much time during the event that he stated that he would adopt the style for all of the future feasts he would hold.

=== The Boxer Rebellion and political challenges ===
The political environment during Peake’s missionary work led to difficulties for himself and for the London Missionary Society. Starting with the Boxer Rebellion, Peake relocated to Hankou (modern Wuhan) for safety, yet still lived in constant fear. The political atmosphere became so dangerous that he would sleep with a robe underneath his bed so that in case of an emergency, he could let himself out of the nearest window. The 1911 Revolution, which would eventually overthrow the Qing dynasty, started with the fighting in the Wuchang-Hankou area in October 1911. After Hunan’s environment settled down, he returned to Hunan and was able to build a hospital and establish a sound medical tradition. From there, he went to Tianjin, where he was in charge of the London Mission Hospital. From May 1914 through October 1916, Peake was on furlough in England. The London Missionary Society sent missionaries on furlough, or on a leave of absence, in an effort to fulfill the expectation that all of the station conditions would become more normal afterwards, and that the opportunity to carry out missionary projects would increase. Much like Guling, this furlough served as a chance for missionaries to take a break from their demanding work and cause them to return to China with even greater motivation to do good. In January 1922, Peake returned to his permanent residence in England due to the terminal illness of his wife, who later died in 1938. After the death of his wife and the last war in China, he offered his services to the London Missionary Society in order to relieve those doctors who had interned by the Japanese during the war. Thus, in 1945, Peake was sent to Hong Kong under the British Army, being given the rank of lieutenant-colonel. He was put in charge of the modern Nethersole Hospital, which was the only hospital open for Chinese civilians during the Japanese occupation of Hong Kong. At this time, Hong Kong was unsafe, being full of bandits. Thus, the Army had to send Peake with an armed escort while he traveled. In 1946, Peake permanently settled to Burpham, England, where he worked as GP of Wellington, where his medical advice and wisdom were sought out by the majority.

Peake was not the only missionary to suffer during the difficult political atmosphere described above, but the London Missionary Society struggled on the whole. During these troublesome times, however, the London Missionary Society did not face as much interference due to China’s political instability as did other missionary groups. During 1927, many missionary groups were forced to evacuate a large portion of their staff from their associated facilities in an effort to maintain safety. 68% of Chinese missionaries under the London Missionary Society were able to stay on Chinese grounds, while only 54% of those from the American Presbyterian Mission, and 26% of those from the American Methodist Episcopal Mission were able to do so. Because the majority of their missionary efforts were concentrated in Treaty Ports and larger towns in China, the London Missionary Society had the ability to keep most of their staff in China. Overall, this group had a large amount of residential living accommodations in Tianjin, Shanghai, and Hong Kong. By having high amounts of housing, some missionaries who had to evacuate the area in which they were stationed were able to relocate to one of the other residential locations, and then once the political atmosphere by their home location improved, they could again return to their original housing accommodations. Of the three central areas, the most missionaries went to Shanghai, while only five or six men stayed in Hankou until they were obliged to leave in January, although many were able to return. Being that Peake was one of these five or six men, he had to be one of the best in his field, as only the select few were sent to Hankou. The London Missionary Society also enabled a system of training in which their medical work was able to sustain itself even when the European missionaries left China, as the Chinese doctors were capable of continuing the system. The ultimate focus of the group was to prepare the Chinese so that they could sustain themselves without European missionary contact, while this originally came from the religious focus of having the Chinese Church ready to take over, this emphasis reflected in the goals of their medical missionaries as well.

== Missionary work ==
When he arrived in Hengchow, Peake converted a building from the Presbyterians located in Hengchow, into a clinic and dispensary for patients. This was the only European hospital in Hunan, China from 1904-1912. Together, Peake and his wife, ran the hospital even when they were shown hatred or faced with death threats on the streets. Over thirty patients showed up each day for treatment, so Peake decided a larger second hospital should be built to support the number of patients that he was receiving. In 1905, he then built a second, better, hospital which grew to an annual intake of six to seven thousand patients over the course of five years. In 1911, Peake decided to join the Red Cross during the Chinese Civil War. He worked between both armies, decorated by the Chinese government. He helped anyone who was injured, regardless of what side of the war they were on. In the beginning of the war, Peake served in the R.A.M.C. for part of the time he was in Belgium. On 15 February 1915 he was even named by the Royal Army of Medical Corps as a member of the Army Medical Service. Other forms of missionary work that Peake participated in consisted of teaching locals modern medicine. This included his assistant Dr. Lei whom Peake saw a lot of potential and had great faith in. While at Mackenzie Memorial Hospital, Peake also reorganized the medical surgical facilities there. Peake spent from 1899 to 1922 giving his time and talent to patients in China.

== Legacy ==
Ernest Cromwell Peake died on 24 December 1950. He was the first medical missionary to attempt to bring modern Western medical techniques to rural China through the London Missionary Society. Peake’s legacy began with a cataract operation that he performed upon a prominent Chinese citizen who had hit his 70s and had gone blind with age. Peake knew that in order to become respected as a missionary, and ultimately live safely in China, this surgery had to go well. The surgery was a success, and became a Peake family legend and a Chinese legend as well. After the surgery was performed, Peake walked outside to a procession of dejected men bowed down and marching in a line formed by holding the pigtail of the man in front of him. The local blind men were walking to the hospital, let by the man who could now see. Peake then opened a new hospital in 1905, which, by 1910, maintained an annual intake for six to seven thousand patients. Peake was one of the missionaries that carried out the goal of the London Missionary Society, in that he taught locals modern medicine, being one of the first to do so. He mentored his assistant, Dr. Lei, whom had a lot of potential. In December 1912, the London Missionary Society appointed Peake to head the MacKenzie Hospital in Tianjin (this hospital became iconic for both China and the United States, as they would later receive money from the United States Congress in 1929 as an act for the relief of MacKenzie Memorial Hospital, German-American Hospital, and Lau Ye Kun, all of Tianjin, China for the care and treatment of Chinese citizens injured by United States Marine Corps motor vehicles, as well as for the indemnity of those nationals for persons whom personal injuries were due to the negligence of the Marine Corps).

== Publications ==
Peake's experiences as a medical missionary are documented in his memoirs, Peake in China: Memoirs of Ernest Cromwell Peake. The book provides a first-hand account of his medical work and social observations in China, particularly during his tenure in Hengyang.Due to its historical value regarding the modern history of Hunan, a physical copy of Peake's memoirs has been officially included in the collection of the Hengyang Library.
