= Little Giant Peak =

Mountain in Colorado, United States

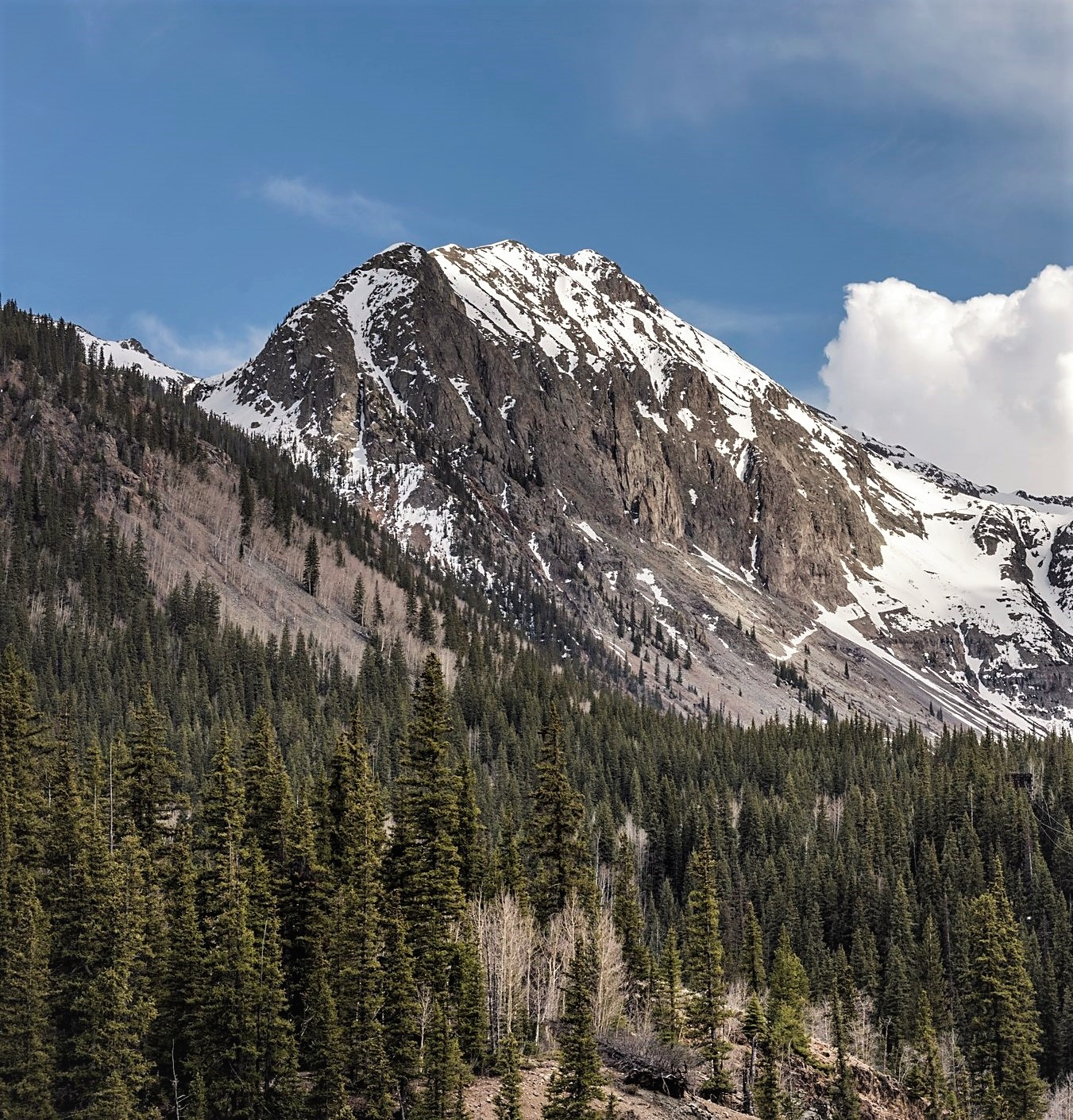
- North ridge of Little Giant Peak

Highest point
- Elevation: 13,417 ft (4,090 m)
- Prominence: 590 ft (180 m)
- Parent peak: Kendall Peak (13,455 ft)
- Isolation: 1.28 mi (2.06 km)
- Coordinates: 37°47′48″N 107°35′55″W

Geography
- Location within Colorado Location within the United States
- Country: United States
- State: Colorado
- County: San Juan
- Parent range: Rocky Mountains; San Juan Mountains
- Topo map: USGS Howardsville

Climbing
- Easiest route: class 2 hiking

Little Giant Peak is a 13,417-foot-elevation (4,090-meter) mountain summit in San Juan County, Colorado, United States.

== Description ==
Little Giant Peak is located 3.5 miles (5.6 km) east-southeast of the community of Silverton on land administered by the Bureau of Land Management. It is three miles (4.8 km) west of the Continental Divide in the San Juan Mountains which are a subrange of the Rocky Mountains. Precipitation runoff from the mountain drains into tributaries of the Animas River. Topographic relief is significant as the summit rises over 1,200 feet (370 meters) above Silver Lake in one-half mile (0.8 km) and 3,050 feet (930 meters) above Cunningham Creek in one mile (1.6 km). The mountain's toponym has been officially adopted by the United States Board on Geographic Names, and has been recorded in publications since at least 1901.

== Climate ==
According to the Köppen climate classification system, Little Giant Peak is located in an alpine subarctic climate zone with long, cold, snowy winters, and cool to warm summers. Due to its altitude, it receives precipitation all year, as snow in winter and as thunderstorms in summer, with a dry period in late spring.

== See also ==
- Thirteener
- Mountains of San Juan County, Colorado
