= Robert Kendall =

Robert Kendall may refer to:

- Robert Kendall (poet), writer
- Robert Kendall (actor) (1927–2009), American actor
- Robert Charles Kendall, chairman of the Central Provident Fund
