= Ernest Leslie Peake =

Singaporean civil servant (1922–1978)

Ernest Leslie Peake JP
- Peake in 1954

Chairman of the Central Provident Fund Board
- In office 28 January 1954 – 1 July 1957
- Preceded by: Position established
- Succeeded by: Robert Charles Kendall

Personal details
- Born: 23 March 1905 Hengchow, China
- Died: 3 July 1978 (aged 73) Sussex, England
- Spouse: Ruth Van Alstine (m. 1934)
- Children: 2
- Education: Eltham College; Chefoo School
- Nickname: Lonnie

Ernest Leslie Peake JP (23 March 1905 – 3 July 1978) was a chartered accountant and the first chairman of the Central Provident Fund Board, after the scheme officially started.

Peake was the chairman of Fraser and Neave and Children's Aid Society Singapore (1955–1957). He also served as a director for United Engineers and Malayan Breweries.

== Early life and education ==
On 23 March 1905, Ernest Leslie Peake was born in Hengchow, China. His father, Ernest Cromwell Peake, was a medical missionary doctor with the London Missionary Society, and his mother, Amanda Elizabeth Powell, had come to China as a missionary assistant. His younger brother, Mervyn Peake, was an author and illustrator.

In July 1905, his mother experienced gynaecological complications, and underwent an operation in Hengchow. However, the operation failed to fix the complications, and his family moved to England in October 1905 to seek treatment. In January 1907, the family moved back to Hengchow.

Peake received his early education in Kuling. In May 1914, Peake and his family moved to Mottingham, London, while his father attended the University of Edinburgh to complete a Doctor of Medicine. During this period, Peake attended Eltham College. In October 1916, Peake and his family moved to Tientsin—a journey that took two months due to World War I. They sailed on Kashima Maru via the Cape of Good Hope. Peake was sent to Chefoo School, a boarding school nearly 800 km (500 mi) away.

In 1921, Peake went back to study at Eltham College, and in January 1923, his family moved back to Mottingham.

== Career ==
In 1929, Peake became a chartered accountant, and he worked in the Kuala Lumpur branch of Evatt & Company, an accounting firm. Later, he was transferred to the Malacca branch of the firm. Peake was also appointed as a liquidator for some rubber estates in Singapore.

In June 1946, Peake returned to Malacca with his wife, and was appointed as the branch manager.

On 28 January 1954, Peake was appointed as the inaugural board chairman of the Central Provident Fund (CPF). In August 1954, three expatriates from the Ministry of Pensions and Insurance arrived in Singapore to assist with the CPF scheme. In March 1955, Peake urged employers to register with the CPF scheme soon, as all earnings would be subject to contributions from 1 May 1955.

On 17 January 1956, Peake disputed a claim that the CPF scheme was introduced too early. He said:

A start has to be made some time with social legislation of this type. Lots of things have been before their time but have turned out successfully. And who can say with certainty whether this scheme is 25, five or 50 years too soon, or indeed whether it is before its time at all.
There are some people who will try to side-step anything, including income tax and exchange control. You find such people in any community, not only in Malaya, and the fact that they exist is no justification for abandoning necessary social legislation.

In March 1956, the three expatriates had contracts expiring next year, and Peake claimed it was difficult to replace them. He said, "there is nobody in Malaya, Asian or European, who can take over the general manager's job".

In June 1957, Peake retired and stepped down as chairman of Fraser and Neave. On 1 July 1957, he resigned as chairman of CPF and he was replaced by Robert Charles Kendall. On 12 July 1957, Peake left Singapore for Sussex, England.

== Personal life ==
On 9 June 1934, Peake married Ruth Thirza Van Alstine (30 March 1910 – 25 July 1976). In October 1934, both of them moved to Kuala Lumpur. Peake and Van Alstine have a son and daughter.

During the Japanese occupation of Malaya, Peake was captured as a prisoner of war and interned at the Sime Road Camp. His wife and two children evacuated to Australia. After the war ended, Peake returned to London and stayed with his brother. In 1946, his wife and children joined him.

On 3 July 1978, Peake died.
