= William Kendall =

William Kendall may refer to:

- William Kendall (actor) (1903–1984), British actor, appeared in The Two Faces of Dr. Jekyll
- William Kendall (cricketer) (born 1973), English cricketer
- William Sergeant Kendall (1869–1938), American painter
- William Kendall (swimmer) (1916–2004), Australian swimmer
- William Kendall (burgess, born 1621) (1621–1686), Virginia colonial politician, speaker of the Virginia House of Burgesses
- William Kendall Jr. (1659–1696), his son, Virginia colonial politician
- Bill Kendall (ice hockey) (1910–1996), Canadian hockey player
- Bill Kendall (trade unionist) (1923–2000), British trade union leader
- William Kendall, character in The $5,000,000 Counterfeiting Plot
- William M. Kendall (1856–1941), American architect
- William W. Kendall (1839–1920), Medal of Honor recipient of the American Civil War

== See also ==
- William Kendell (1851–1922), Australian politician
