= Kendall Basin =

Cirque in the Shackleton Range, Antarctica

Kendall Basin (80°15′S 25°39′W) is an ice-free cirque at the northwest end of the Herbert Mountains, in the Shackleton Range, Antarctica. It was photographed from the air by the U.S. Navy, 1967, and surveyed by the British Antarctic Survey, 1968–71. In association with the names of glacial geologists grouped in this area, it was named by the UK Antarctic Place-Names Committee in 1971 after Percy Fry Kendall, an English glacial geologist, Professor of Geology at Leeds University in the early 20th century.
