= Tony Kendall =

Tony Kendall may refer to:

- Tony Kendall (poker player) (born 1947), English poker player
- Tony Kendall (actor) (1936–2009), Italian model and actor
