= Lost Eden, Arizona =

Populated place in Coconino County, Arizona, US

- Populated place
- Location within the state of Arizona Lost Eden (the United States)
- Coordinates: 34°37′54″N 111°15′40″W
- Country: United States
- State: Arizona
- County: Coconino
- Elevation: 6,713 ft (2,046 m)
- Time zone: UTC-7 (Mountain (MST))
  - Summer (DST): UTC-7 (MST)
- Area code: 928
- FIPS code: 04-42185
- GNIS feature ID: 31299

Lost Eden is a populated place situated in Coconino County, Arizona, United States. It has an estimated elevation of 6,713 feet (2,046 m) above sea level.
