= Kendall Terrace =

Volcanic ash terrace on Deception Island, South Shetland Islands

Kendall Terrace (62°55′S 60°42′W) is an ice-free volcanic ash terrace extending along the northwestern side of Deception Island, in the South Shetland Islands. It was named by the UK Antarctic Place-Names Committee in 1957 for Lieutenant Edward N. Kendall, Royal Navy, the surveyor on HMS Chanticleer, who made the first survey of Deception Island in January–March 1829.
