= Robert Charles Kendall =

Singaporean accountant

Robert Charles Kendall JP

Chairman of the Central Provident Fund Board
- In office September 1954 – October 1954
- Preceded by: Ernest Leslie Peake
- Succeeded by: Ernest Leslie Peake
- In office 1 July 1957 – 31 July 1958
- Preceded by: Ernest Leslie Peake
- Succeeded by: Khoo Teck Puat

Robert Charles Kendall JP was a chartered accountant and chairman of the Central Provident Fund Board from 1957 to 1958. Kendall was also chairman of The Straits Times, from 1955 to 1965, and served as director for Robinson and Company.

== Career ==
Kendall was a chartered accountant, and worked together with Ernest Leslie Peake as liquidators for Evatt & Company, an accounting firm. On 1 January 1951, Kendall became a partner of Evatt & Company.

In 1953, Kendall was a director of The Straits Times. In 1954, he was briefly chairman of the Central Provident Fund Board, in place of Peake. On 29 September 1954, Kendall revealed that the board will keep a register of employers and their employees, estimated to be between 200,000 and 250,000. He also said the scheme will probably only begin in March 1955, and not in January 1955 as reported by others. In October 1954, Kendall admitted that the board had no investment policy yet, as the "law allows only certain ventures".

In 1955, Kendall became the chairman of The Straits Times. In December 1955, he announced the construction of a new building for the newspaper, costing roughly $2 million.

On 1 July 1957, Kendall was appointed as the chairman of CPF, succeeding Peake. On 24 December 1957, he was also appointed as a justice of the peace. On 31 July 1958, Kendall resigned as chairman of CPF, and he was succeeded by Khoo Teck Puat.

In 1965, Kendall retired.
