= Edward Kendall =

Edward Kendall may refer to:

- Edward Calvin Kendall (1886–1972), American biochemist
- Edward H. Kendall (1842–1901), American architect
- Edward Augustus Kendall (1776–1842), translator, social campaigner and miscellaneous writer
- Edward Nicholas Kendall (1800–1845), English hydrographer, Royal Navy officer, and polar explorer
- Edward "Ned" Kendall (1808–1861), American bandleader and bugler

== See also ==
- Edward Kendall Crace (1844–1892), Australian pastoralist
