= Kendall Peak (Colorado) =

Mountain in the state of Colorado

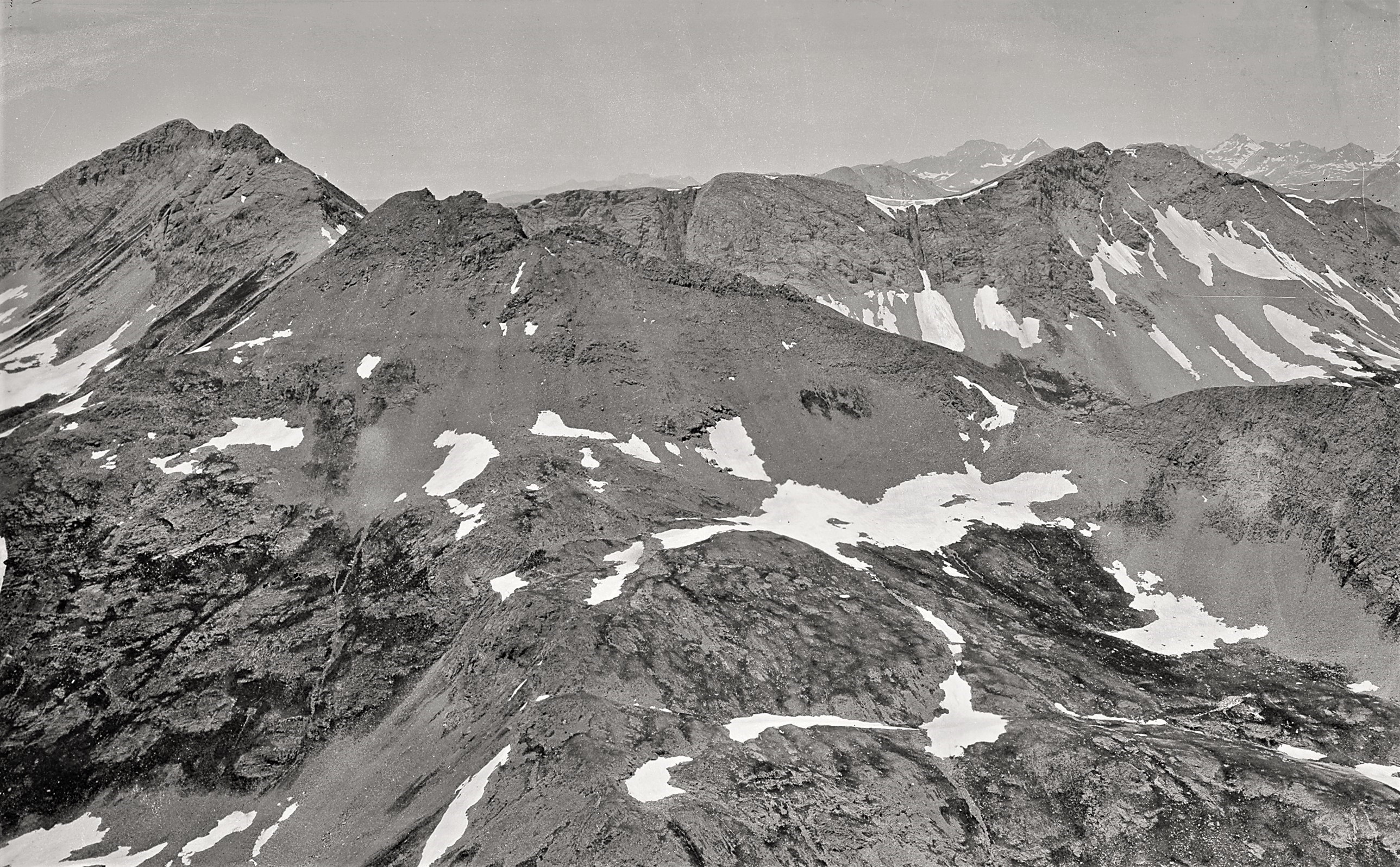
- Kendall Peak (upper left corner) with Kendall Mountain in upper right. View from Little Giant Peak. (1875, by William Henry Jackson)

Highest point
- Elevation: 13,455 ft (4,101 m)
- Prominence: 1,148 ft (350 m)
- Parent peak: Canby Mountain (13,478 ft)
- Isolation: 4.06 mi (6.53 km)
- Coordinates: 37°47′14″N 107°37′06″W

Naming
- Etymology: James Kendall

Geography
- Location within Colorado Location within the United States
- Country: United States
- State: Colorado
- County: San Juan
- Parent range: Rocky Mountains; San Juan Mountains
- Topo map: USGS Howardsville

Climbing
- Easiest route: class 2 hiking

Kendall Peak is a 13,455-foot-elevation (4,101-meter) mountain summit in San Juan County, Colorado, United States.

== Description ==
Kendall Peak is located three miles (4.8 km) southeast of the community of Silverton on land administered by the Bureau of Land Management. It is 3.5 miles (5.6 km) west of the Continental Divide in the San Juan Mountains which are a subrange of the Rocky Mountains. Precipitation runoff from the mountain drains into tributaries of the Animas River. Topographic relief is significant as the summit rises 1,270 feet (390 meters) above Silver Lake in one-half mile (0.8 km) and 4,250 feet (1,300 meters) above the Animas River valley in 2.7 miles (4.3 km). The highest point of Kendall Mountain (13,353 ft) is 0.65 mile north of Kendall Peak.

== History ==
The mountain's "Kendall Peak" toponym has been officially adopted by the United States Board on Geographic Names, and has been recorded in publications since at least 1906. The Kendall Mountain name has been recorded since at least 1879. The mountain is named for James Kendall, miner and prospector in the San Juan Mountains in the 1800s. The toponym "Mount Kendall" was listed by Henry Gannett in his 1884 "A Dictionary of Altitudes in the United States" as having been named by the Hayden and Wheeler surveys. Mount Kendall was listed as having elevations of 13,542-ft and 13,380-ft which roughly correspond to the elevations of Kendall Peak and Kendall Mountain.

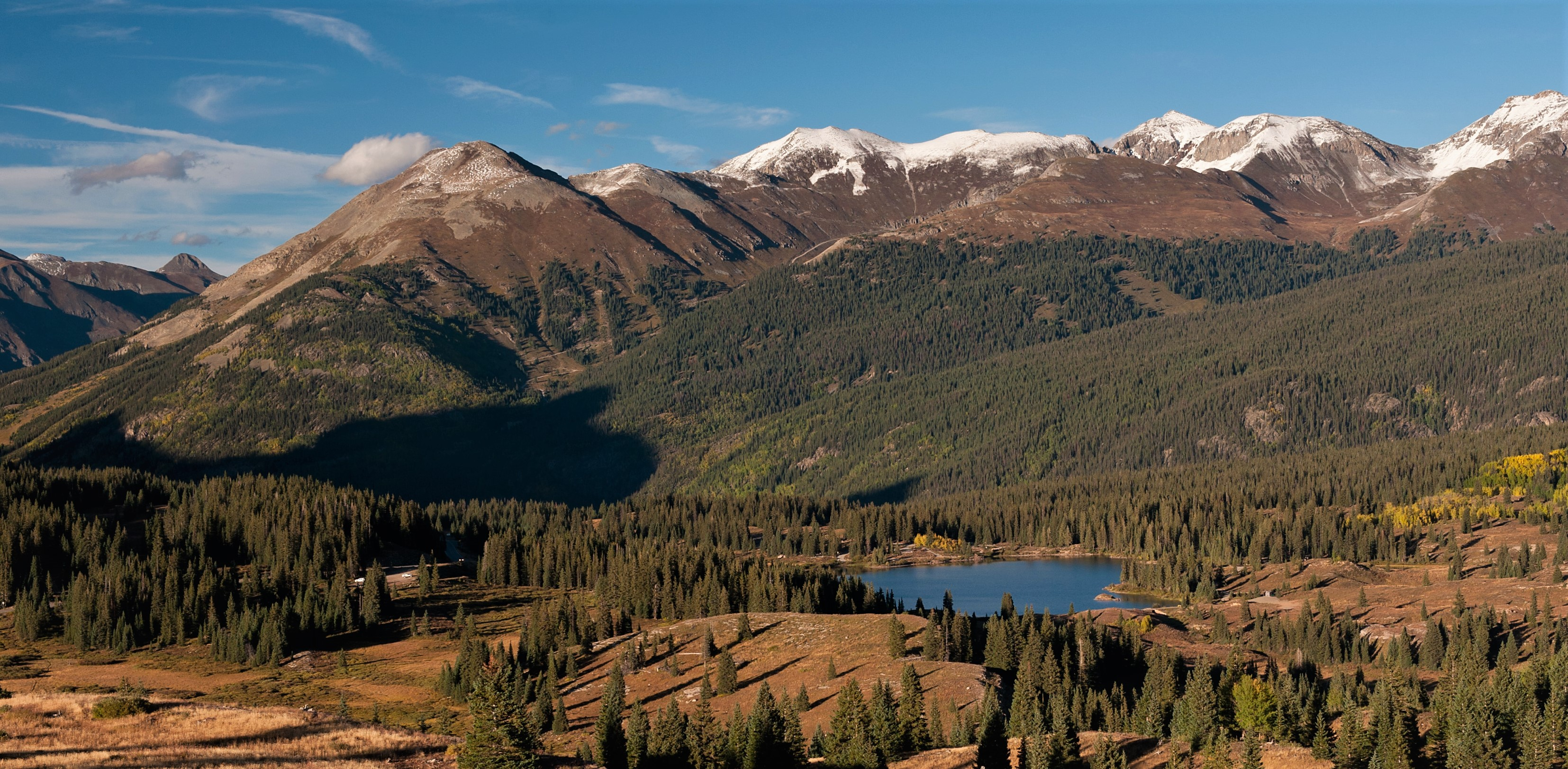
Kendall Mountain (center) and Kendall Peak (right) from the southwest

== Climate ==
According to the Köppen climate classification system, Kendall Peak is located in an alpine subarctic climate zone with long, cold, snowy winters, and cool to warm summers. Due to its altitude, it receives precipitation all year, as snow in winter and as thunderstorms in summer, with a dry period in late spring. This climate supports the Kendall Mountain Ski Area.

== See also ==
- Thirteener
- Mountains of San Juan County, Colorado
