= Ken Kendall =

Australian rules footballer

Personal information
- Full name: Elverene Park Kendall
- Born: 6 March 1884; Sandhurst
- Died: 27 March 1969 (aged 85); Hawthorn, Victoria
- Original team: University Metropolitan Club / Wesley College

Playing career^{1}
| Years | Club | Games (Goals) |
| 1908 | University | 1 (0) |
- ^{1} Playing statistics correct to the end of 1908.

Elverene Park "Ken" Kendall (6 March 1884 – 27 March 1969) was an Australian rules footballer who played with University in the Victorian Football League (VFL).

== Sources ==
- Holmesby, Russell & Main, Jim (2007). The Encyclopedia of AFL Footballers. 7th ed. Melbourne: Bas Publishing.
- Ken Kendall's playing statistics from AFL Tables
