= Kendel (river) =

River in Germany

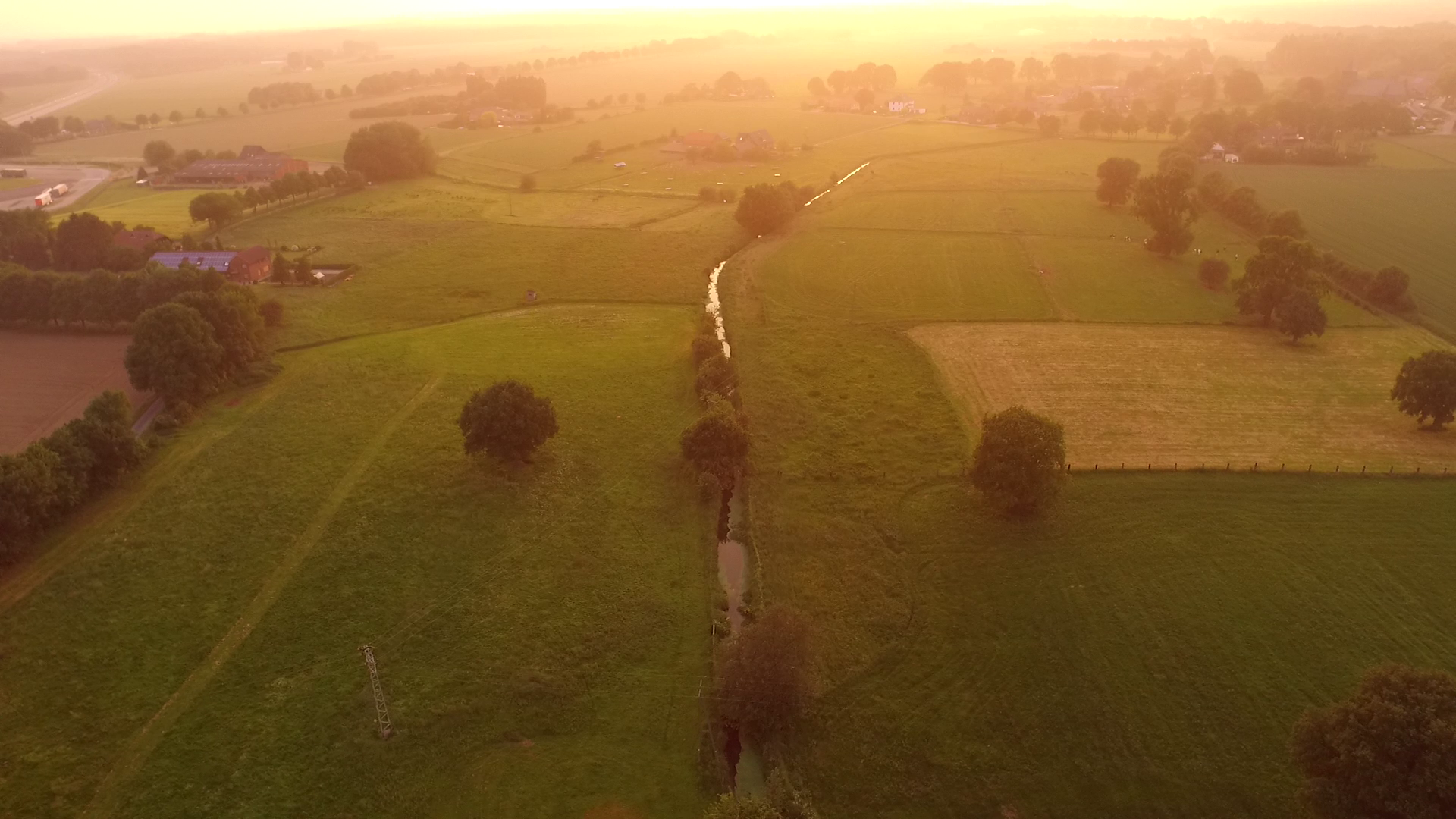

Location
- Country: Germany
- State: North Rhine-Westphalia

Physical characteristics
- Mouth
  - location: Niers
  - coordinates: 51.6895°N 6.0283°E
- Length: 24.9 km (15.5 mi)

Basin features
- Progression: Niers→ Meuse→ North Sea

The Kendel, sometimes also called Hommersumer Kendel to distinguish it from other Kendels, is a river of North Rhine-Westphalia, Germany that originates near Weeze and flows into the Niers after about 25 km (16 mi) near Goch-Hommersum, on the border with the Netherlands.

== Geology ==
The Kendel follows almost its entire length, via five loops, a silted-up old channel of the Ur-Rhine (generally called "Kendel" on the Lower Rhine), which meanders through the Lower Rhine lowlands with a very slight gradient. This channel is already recognizable from Krefeld and is known in its southern section as Niepkuhlen.

== History ==
The Kendel branches off from the Ottersgraben to the west of Weeze. From Weeze, the Kendel runs roughly parallel to the German-Dutch border on the west side and the Niers and the A57 on the east side, past the Goch districts of Hülm, Gaesdonck and Hassum to Hommersum.

On the last 700 meters north of Hommersum to the confluence with the Niers, the Kendel is the border river between Germany (state of North Rhine-Westphalia) and the Netherlands (province of Limburg with the village of Gennep-Ottersum). On this portion there is still a bridge over the Kendel, which is also a border crossing. There used to be a railway bridge here for the Boxteler Bahn; however, this bridge was blown up by German troops in the final phase of the Second World War during Operation Market Garden on September 18, 1944.

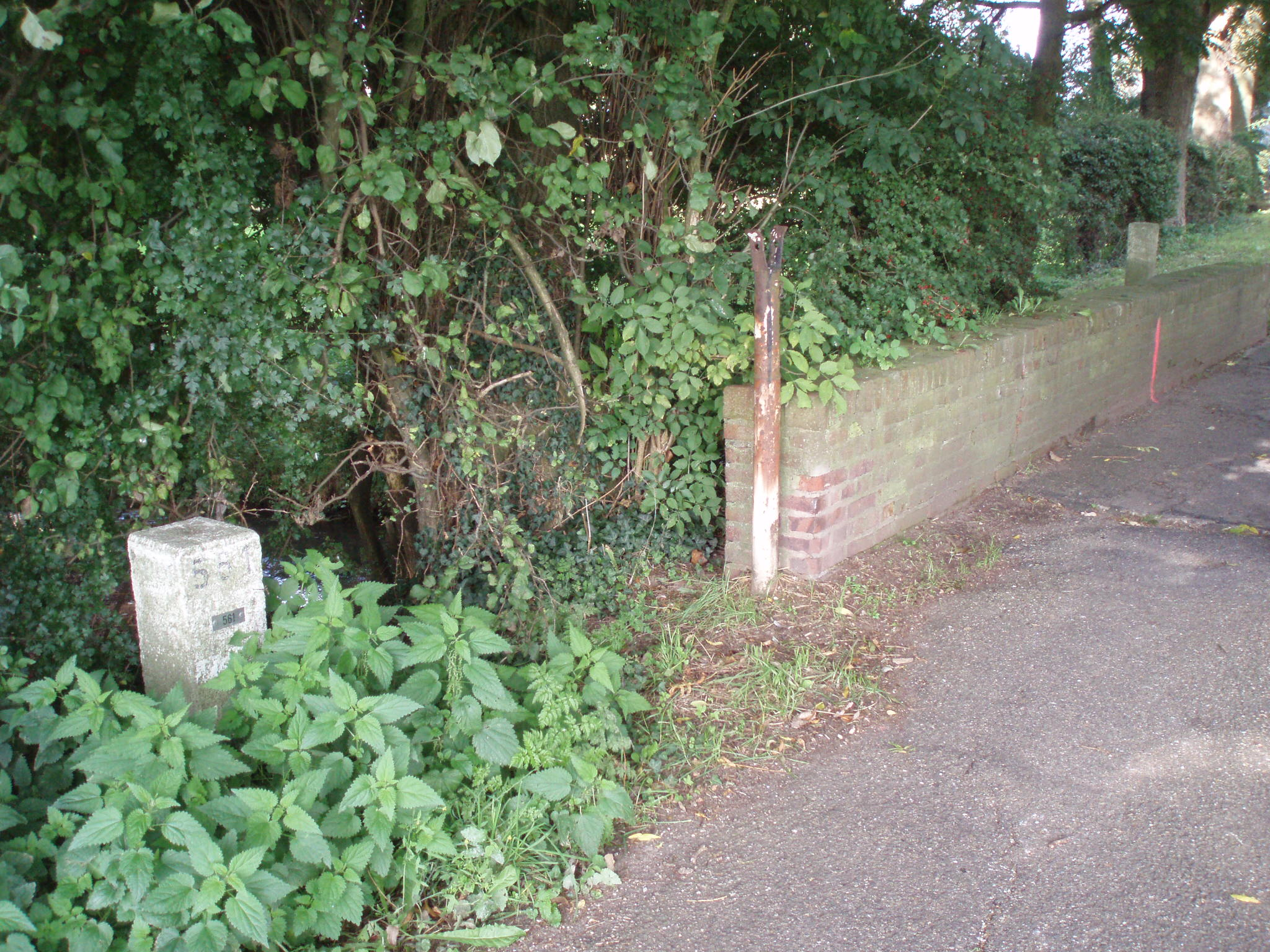
Bridge over the Kendel near Hommersum with German and Dutch boundary stones

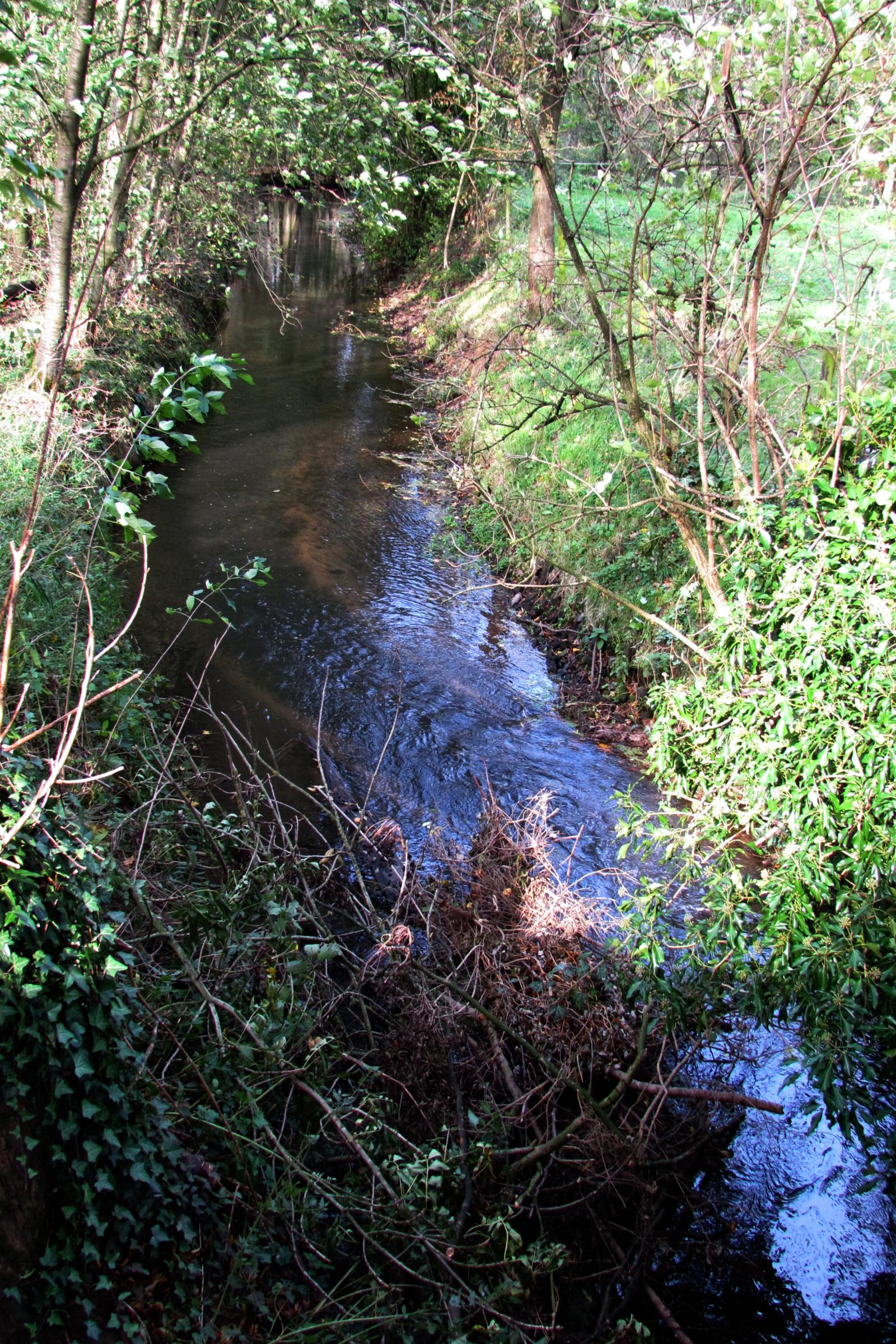
Kendel in Hommersum

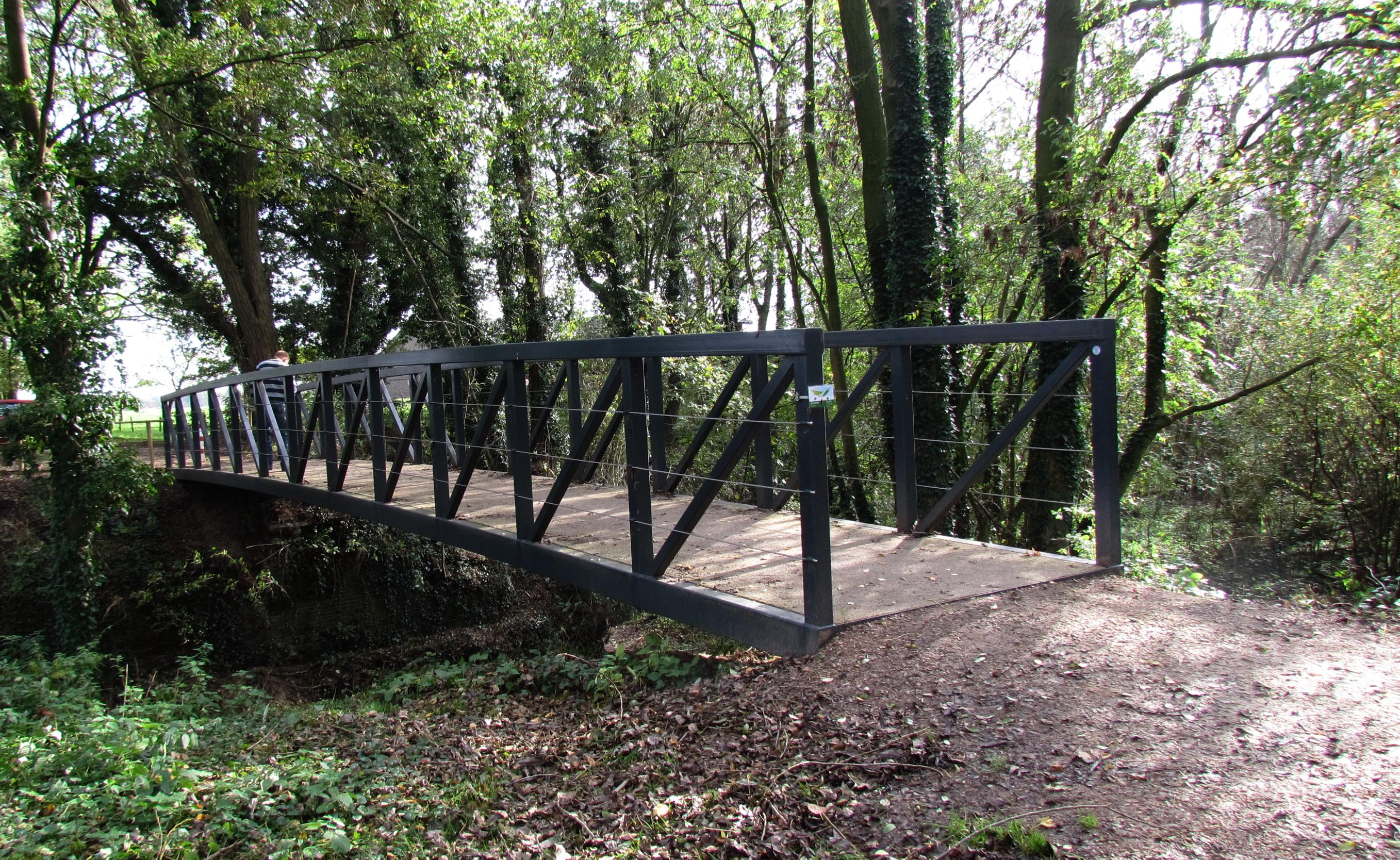
Pedestrian bridge near the Isshöveler mill

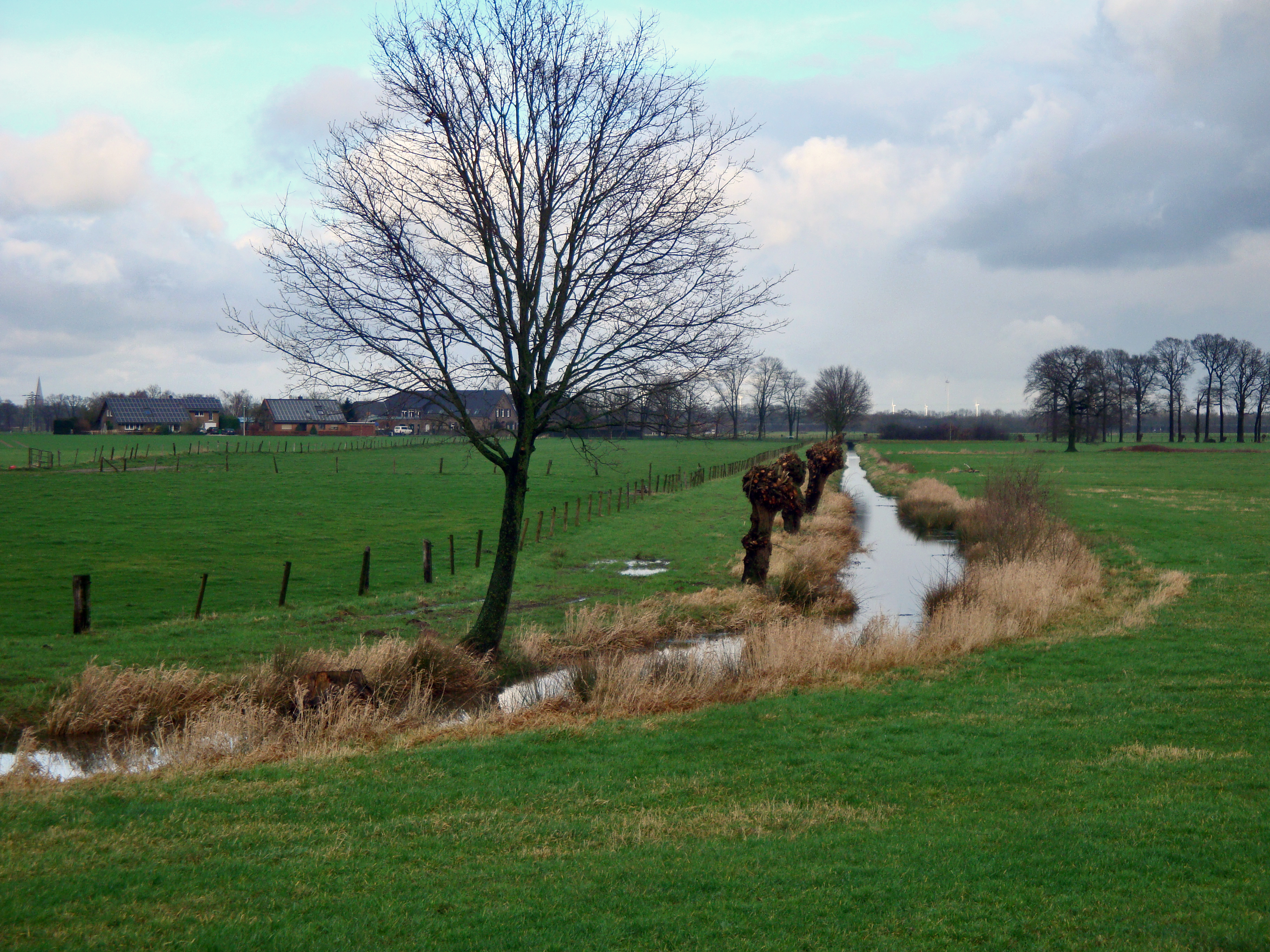
Kendel in Hülm

== See also ==
- List of rivers of North Rhine-Westphalia
