= Peter Kendall =

Peter Kendall may refer to:

- Peter Kendall (cricketer) (born 1938), English cricketer
- Sir Peter Kendall (farmer) (born 1960), English farmer and National Farmers' Union officeholder
- Peter Mark Kendall (born 1986), American actor and musician
- Pete Kendall (born 1973), American football player
