= David Kendall =

David Kendall is the name of:

- Dave Kendall (1963–2026), British journalist and VJ
- David Kendall (director) (1957–2026), American director, producer and writer
- David Kendall, English-Australian actor and teacher, father of actress and director Kate Kendall
- David E. Kendall (born 1944), Washington, D.C. lawyer, personal attorney of President Clinton during his impeachment
- David George Kendall (1918–2007), British statistician
- David W. Kendall (1903–1976), American attorney, White House Counsel to President Dwight D. Eisenhower
