= Kendall Grove, Virginia =

Unincorporated community in Virginia, US

Coordinates: 37°22′04″N 75°55′16″W

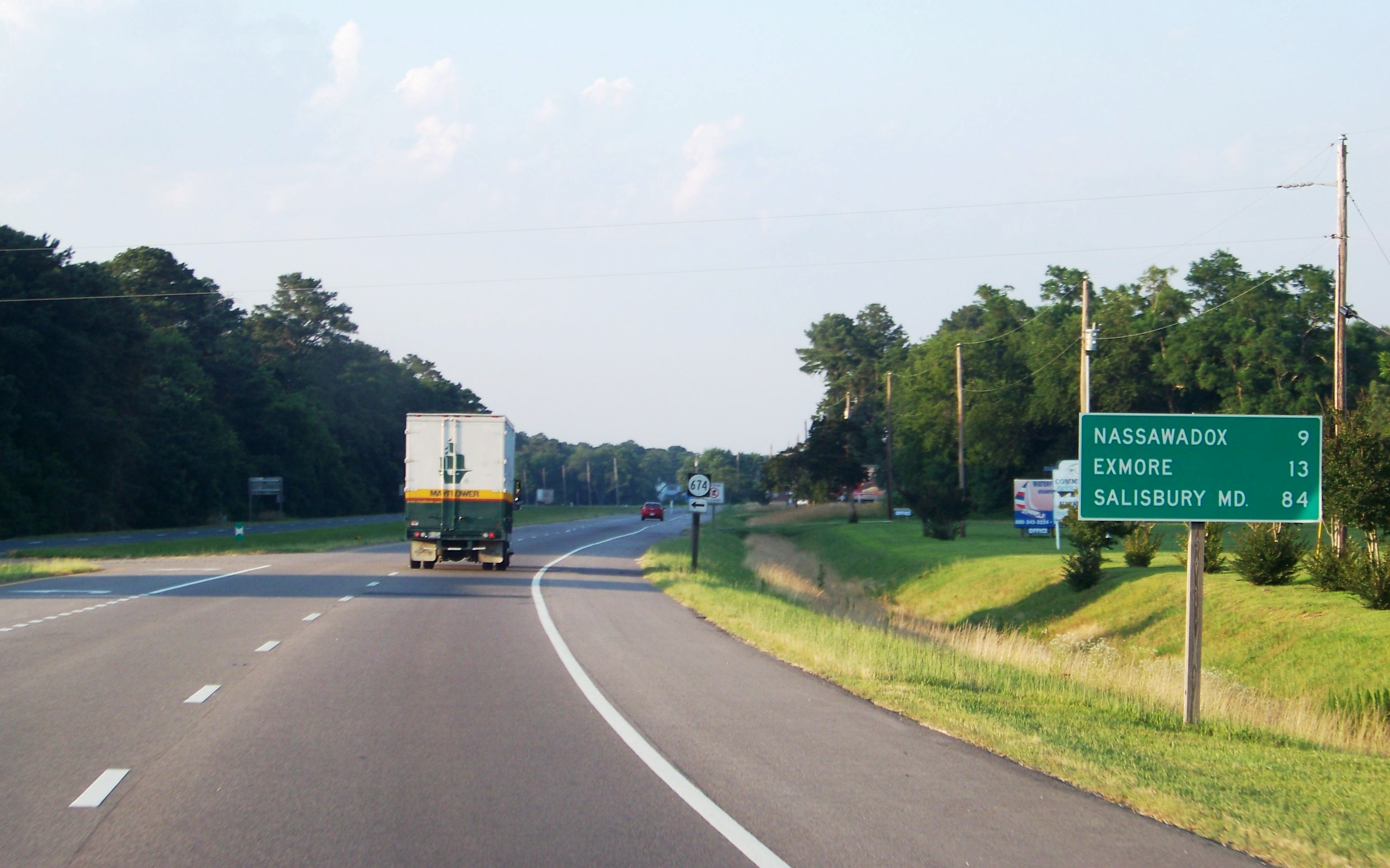
Entering Kendall Grove

Kendall Grove is an unincorporated community in Northampton County, Virginia, United States. The community is located along U.S. Route 13, north of Eastville.
