= List of United States tornadoes from November to December 2010 =

This is a list of all tornadoes that were confirmed by local offices of the National Weather Service in the United States in November and December 2010.

== United States yearly total ==
Confirmed tornadoes by Enhanced Fujita rating
EFU	EF0	EF1	EF2	EF3	EF4	EF5	Total
0	768	342	127	32	13	0	1,282

== November ==
Confirmed tornadoes by Enhanced Fujita rating
EFU	EF0	EF1	EF2	EF3	EF4	EF5	Total
0	19	25	7	1	1	0	54

- One tornado was confirmed in the final totals, but does not have a listed rating.

=== November 3 event ===
List of confirmed tornadoes – Wednesday, November 3, 2010 (Note: All dates are based on the local time zone where the tornado touched down; however, all times are in Coordinated Universal Time for consistency.)
EF#	Location	County / Parish	State	Start Coord.	Time (UTC)	Path length	Max width	Damage (Note: All damage totals are in 2010 USD unless otherwise stated.)	Summary
EF0	Zachary	East Baton Rouge	LA	30.6452°N 91.1532°W	22:00	0.25 mi (0.40 km)	50 yd (46 m)	$5,000	Brief tornado blew tin off a roof.
EF0	SW of Des Allemands	St. Charles	LA	29.8095°N 90.4936°W	22:08	0.25 mi (0.40 km)	25 yd (23 m)	N/A	Brief waterspout observed at New Orleans International Airport with no damage.

=== November 17 event ===
List of confirmed tornadoes – Wednesday, November 17, 2010
EF#	Location	County / Parish	State	Start Coord.	Time (UTC)	Path length	Max width	Damage	Summary
EF1	Parkville	Baltimore (city), Baltimore	MD	39.3665°N 76.5705°W	06:35–06:36	0.1 mi (0.16 km)	175 yd (160 m)	$250,000	Brief tornado embedded in an area of intense straight-line wind damage. Significant damage to an apartment complex and a shopping area from the tornado itself. Three people were injured.
EF1	Jessup	Lackawanna	PA	41.4624°N 75.5623°W	07:30–07:40	1.73 mi (2.78 km)	150 yd (140 m)	$125,000	An athletic park sustained significant damage and two businesses were also heavily damaged. Numerous trees were also knocked down or snapped.
EF1	Ghent	Columbia	NY	42.2661°N 73.6643°W	10:18–10:22	1.87 mi (3.01 km)	300 yd (270 m)	$4,000	Numerous trees were knocked down and a few houses sustained minor damage.

=== November 22 event ===
List of confirmed tornadoes – Monday, November 22, 2010
EF#	Location	County / Parish	State	Start Coord.	Time (UTC)	Path length	Max width	Damage	Summary
EF2	Caledonia area	Winnebago, Boone	IL	42.3307°N 88.9709°W	21:00–21:25	18.1 mi (29.1 km)	200 yd (180 m)	$5,000,000	At least 30 buildings were damaged or destroyed, including houses, barns, outbuildings and grain bins - a few of which were also damaged in a tornado on January 7, 2008. Numerous transmission towers were heavily damaged and a school bus was thrown, injuring six people.
EF1	W of Zenda, WI	McHenry (IL), Walworth (WI)	IL, WI	42.4932°N 88.5704°W	21:31–21:37	5.48 mi (8.82 km)	100 yd (91 m)	$1,000,000	Two houses sustained significant roof damage and three other houses sustained minor damage. Several farm buildings were also damaged and power poles were knocked down. Many farm animals were killed on a farm.
EF1	Union Grove area	Kenosha, Racine	WI	42.6625°N 88.0884°W	22:01–22:15	11.44 mi (18.41 km)	150 yd (140 m)	$5,000,000	Over 100 houses and a gas station were damaged and an RV trailer was destroyed. The Racine County Fairgrounds were also hard hit with many buildings damaged. Many trees were also uprooted or snapped. Two people were injured.

=== November 23 event ===
List of confirmed tornadoes – Tuesday, November 23, 2010
EF#	Location	County / Parish	State	Start Coord.	Time (UTC)	Path length	Max width	Damage	Summary
EF1	NW of Harrisville	Simpson	MS	31.9896°N 90.1025°W	16:30–16:50	8.01 mi (12.89 km)	150 yd (140 m)	$350,000	One house was damaged and several outbuildings were destroyed. Extensive tree damage along the path.
EF1	NE of Martinsville	Simpson	MS	31.9935°N 89.7217°W	17:35–17:40	2.06 mi (3.32 km)	75 yd (69 m)	$250,000	Several houses were damaged, a mobile home lost its roof and a chicken house was destroyed.
EF1	Latrobe area	El Dorado	CA	38.582°N 120.9791°W	21:17–21:21	1.99 mi (3.20 km)	10 yd (9.1 m)	$2,000	A rare tornado caused roof damage to a commercial building, damaged a powerole, a water tank, and numerous trees.

=== November 24 event ===
List of confirmed tornadoes – Wednesday, November 24, 2010
EF#	Location	County / Parish	State	Start Coord.	Time (UTC)	Path length	Max width	Damage	Summary
EF0	N of Wheatland	Hickory	MO	37.9439°N 93.4178°W	22:50–22:55	0.98 mi (1.58 km)	75 yd (69 m)	$25,000	A house sustained roof damage and a shed was destroyed.
EF1	ENE of Cross Timbers	Hickory	MO	38.0309°N 93.1975°W	23:09–23:19	2.79 mi (4.49 km)	150 yd (140 m)	$75,000	Significant damage to two houses and three outbuildings. Farm equipment was also destroyed.
EF1	S of Brighton	Polk	MO	37.4469°N 93.3615°W	01:11–01:21	0.85 mi (1.37 km)	200 yd (180 m)	$75,000	Three outbuildings were heavily damaged, two of which were destroyed. A house was also damaged.

=== November 25 event ===
List of confirmed tornadoes – Thursday, November 25, 2010
EF#	Location	County / Parish	State	Start Coord.	Time (UTC)	Path length	Max width	Damage	Summary
EF0	NW of Humboldt	Gibson	TN	35.8464°N 88.8671°W	20:30–20:31	0.61 mi (0.98 km)	200 yd (180 m)	$100,000	About 12 houses sustained minor damage, mostly to their roofs. A few barns were also damaged.
EF0	S of Jennings	Jefferson Davis	LA	30.1957°N 92.6604°W	04:45–20:50	2.78 mi (4.47 km)	75 yd (69 m)	$150,000	Several houses sustained minor damage and outbuildings were destroyed.
EF0	S of Evangeline	Acadia	LA	30.2768°N 92.5955°W	05:00–05:01	0.34 mi (0.55 km)	25 yd (23 m)	$10,000	Brief tornado destroyed a barn, damaged an RV and knocked down a few trees.
EF1	SSW of Iota	Acadia	LA	30.3016°N 92.5126°W	05:13–05:18	2.37 mi (3.81 km)	100 yd (91 m)	$125,000	Six houses were damaged, one of which was removed from its foundation. Several outbuildings were also destroyed.
EF1	NE of Iota	Acadia	LA	30.3897°N 92.3996°W	05:30–05:40	4.99 mi (8.03 km)	50 yd (46 m)	$75,000	A barn was destroyed and several houses were damaged.
EF1	NW of Richard	Acadia	LA	30.4439°N 92.3238°W	05:45–05:54	3.74 mi (6.02 km)	200 yd (180 m)	$100,000	Six houses sustained roof damage. Trees and power lines were also knocked down.
EF1	N of Church Point	St. Landry	LA	30.4768°N 92.2252°W	05:57–06:01	2.68 mi (4.31 km)	200 yd (180 m)	$150,000	Several houses were damaged and a barn was destroyed.

=== November 26 event ===
List of confirmed tornadoes – Friday, November 26, 2010
EF#	Location	County / Parish	State	Start Coord.	Time (UTC)	Path length	Max width	Damage	Summary
EF1	S of Lawtell	St. Landry	LA	30.50°N 92.19°W	06:02	2.15 mi (3.46 km)	300 yd (270 m)	$100,000	Two mobile homes were heavily damaged and several other houses were also damaged. One person was injured.

=== November 29 event ===
List of confirmed tornadoes – Monday, November 29, 2010
EF#	Location	County / Parish	State	Start Coord.	Time (UTC)	Path length	Max width	Damage	Summary
EF4	SSW of Atlanta to NW of Winnfield	Winn	LA	31.7947°N 92.808°W	21:12–21:25	13.96 mi (22.47 km)	400 yd (370 m)	$750,000	One large brick house were completely destroyed in a rural area and a mobile home was also destroyed. Several other houses were damaged and many trees were damaged. Some of the damaged houses were also damaged by a tornado from Hurricane Ike in 2008. As of 2023, it is the most recent violent tornado in Louisiana.
EF1	Bosco area	Ouachita	LA	32.2802°N 92.1872°W	22:18–22:26	3.67 mi (5.91 km)	100 yd (91 m)	$10,000	A house sustained minor damage and many trees were damaged along the Ouachita River.
EF0	NNW of Mooresville	Livingston	MO	39.7901°N 93.7416°W	22:10–22:11	0.33 mi (0.53 km)	25 yd (23 m)	N/A	Brief tornado touchdown with no damage.
EF1	N of Holly Bluff	Sharkey	MS	32.8764°N 90.7433°W	01:19–01:23	3.58 mi (5.76 km)	100 yd (91 m)	$200,000	Tornado touched down in the Delta National Forest with significant tree damage.
EF0	NNE of Valley Park	Issaquena, Sharkey	MS	32.6586°N 90.8576°W	01:25–01:27	1.18 mi (1.90 km)	50 yd (46 m)	$85,000	A mobile home and a few outbuildings were damaged.
EF2	NNW of Satartia to SW of Yazoo City	Yazoo	MS	32.7151°N 90.6259°W	01:46–02:00	11.7 mi (18.8 km)	200 yd (180 m)	$700,000	A mobile home was destroyed and several houses were heavily damaged. A metal frame building also lost its roof, and semi trucks were overturned. The parent supercell would soon re-strengthen and produce another EF2, which tracked directly through Yazoo City.
EF0	NE of Vicksburg	Warren	MS	32.3658°N 90.8303°W	02:04–02:06	1.9 mi (3.1 km)	25 yd (23 m)	$100,000	Numerous trees and a few power lines were snapped.
EF2	Yazoo City area	Yazoo	MS	32.8464°N 90.4195°W	02:07–02:19	7.45 mi (11.99 km)	150 yd (140 m)	$1,300,000	After the previous EF2 dissipated, a new tornado tracked through the downtown area of Yazoo City, which was previously hit very hard on April 24, 2010. Numerous businesses and the Yazoo City courthouse sustained roof and some exterior damage, with one business severely damaged. Windows were also blown out of buildings and trees were uprooted. The Yazoo City Schools Administrative Office was badly damaged and a nearby brick building partially collapsed. A large metal awning was torn apart as well.
EF0	NNW of Port Gibson	Claiborne	MS	31.9728°N 91.0652°W	02:30–02:31	0.69 mi (1.11 km)	30 yd (27 m)	$10,000	Brief tornado with minor tree damage.
EF0	N of Utica	Hinds	MS	32.21°N 90.70°W	03:09–03:18	7.25 mi (11.67 km)	50 yd (46 m)	$5,000	Sporadic minor tree damage and an outbuilding was damaged.
EF1	NNE of Port Gibson	Claiborne	MS	32.0427°N 90.9647°W	03:25–03:28	1.69 mi (2.72 km)	40 yd (37 m)	$30,000	Brief tornado damaged or uprooted several trees.
EF3	N of Thomastown	Leake, Attala	MS	32.9053°N 89.7191°W	03:38–03:50	9.61 mi (15.47 km)	400 yd (370 m)	$1,250,000	A frame house and numerous mobile homes were destroyed and many other houses were damaged, some heavily. Vehicles were also thrown and many trees were uprooted or snapped with a few debarked. Six people were injured.
EF2	Starkville	Oktibbeha	MS	33.4404°N 88.8299°W	05:08–05:10	1.68 mi (2.70 km)	200 yd (180 m)	$850,000	Two mobile home parks were hard hit, with many mobile homes destroyed. Starkville High School was also damaged in its athletic park, and several businesses also sustained minor damage. 15 people were injured.
EF1	N of West Point	Clay	MS	33.6401°N 88.6721°W	05:26–05:29	1.68 mi (2.70 km)	150 yd (140 m)	$250,000	Several houses sustained minor damage and sheds were destroyed. Trees were also uprooted or snapped.
EF2	SSE of Amory	Monroe	MS	33.8767°N 88.4628°W	05:52–06:02	0.28 mi (0.45 km)	125 yd (114 m)	$250,000	This stationary, strong tornado touched down in a manufactured home park. About 20 manufactured homes were damaged or destroyed, injuring 11 people. Trees were also snapped and power lines were knocked down.

=== November 30 event ===
List of confirmed tornadoes – Tuesday, November 30, 2010
EF#	Location	County / Parish	State	Start Coord.	Time (UTC)	Path length	Max width	Damage	Summary
EF0	E of Church Point	St. Landry	LA	30.4219°N 92.1662°W	06:38–06:38	1.03 mi (1.66 km)	25 yd (23 m)	$5,000	A few trees were knocked down and a barn sustained minor damage.
EF0	WNW of Sunset	St. Landry	LA	30.4366°N 92.1172°W	06:46–06:47	1.26 mi (2.03 km)	25 yd (23 m)	$5,000	A barn lost its roof and some trees were knocked down.
EF1	W of Millport	Lamar	AL	33.5530°N 88.1022°W	07:41–07:43	1.37 mi (2.20 km)	150 yd (140 m)	$145,000	Two barns were heavily damaged and two houses sustained minor damage. A tractor-trailer was blown over and many trees were knocked down.
EF2	NW of Raleigh	Smith	MS	32.0123°N 89.6019°W	08:44–08:59	11.03 mi (17.75 km)	600 yd (550 m)	$900,000	A mobile home, several barns and sheds were destroyed, and several houses were damaged, one heavily. Extensive tree damage along the path.
EF0	ESE of Beechwood	Amite	MS	31.1288°N 90.7306°W	08:50–08:59	4.81 mi (7.74 km)	25 yd (23 m)	$5,000	Brief tornado with minor tree damage.
EF1	NNE of Scott Station	Perry	AL	32.6267°N 87.4231°W	10:15–10:16	0.08 mi (0.13 km)	50 yd (46 m)	$25,000	Brief tornado damaged a house, destroyed a shed and uprooted numerous trees.
EF0	NE of Tuckers Crossing	Jones	MS	31.6211°N 89.0801°W	11:50–11:58	7 mi (11 km)	30 yd (27 m)	$70,000	A barn and a workshop both lost their roofs, a flagpole was bent and trees and power poles were damaged.
EF0	N of Pearlington	Hancock	MS	30.3658°N 89.6213°W	13:40	0.05 mi (0.080 km)	25 yd (23 m)	$70,000	Brief waterspout on a canal did minor damage to one structure.
EF1	Blountsville area	Blount	AL	34.1558°N 86.5751°W	13:09–13:11	1.72 mi (2.77 km)	175 yd (160 m)	$26,000	Two houses were damaged, one of which lost its roof. Trees were also knocked down.
EF1	Prattville area	Autauga	AL	32.4281°N 86.5065°W	15:57–16:06	5.81 mi (9.35 km)	155 yd (142 m)	$58,000	Several houses and businesses were damaged in town and metal outbuildings were destroyed.
EF0	S of Hatchett	Clay	AL	33.1121°N 86.0659°W	16:14–16:16	1.67 mi (2.69 km)	40 yd (37 m)	$15,000	Several trees were uprooted, one of which damaged a vehicle.
EF0	NE of Dexter	Elmore	AL	32.5989°N 86.2311°W	16:23–16:31	6.65 mi (10.70 km)	100 yd (91 m)	$35,000	A hay barn lost its roof and a house sustained minor damage.
EF2	Buford	Gwinnett	GA	34.0426°N 83.9505°W	20:38–20:40	2.11 mi (3.40 km)	100 yd (91 m)	$5,000,000	Tornado touched down in a residential subdivision where about 20 houses were heavily damaged, one of which was destroyed. Over 35 other houses sustained lesser damage. Numerous greenhouses in a nursery in the area were also destroyed.
EF0	SE of Locust Grove	Butts, Henry	GA	33.2915°N 84.0838°W	21:12–21:15	2.68 mi (4.31 km)	50 yd (46 m)	$255,000	Several houses sustained minor damage and sheds and outbuildings were heavily damaged or destroyed. A gas station was also damaged.
EF1	Easley	Pickens	SC	34.8291°N 82.6052°W	00:45–00:49	2.66 mi (4.28 km)	125 yd (114 m)	$1,500,000	Intermittent tornado touchdown in town. Numerous houses and businesses were damaged, some heavily, and a manufactured home was destroyed. Many trees were uprooted or snapped.
EF1	Gray Court area	Laurens	SC	34.658°N 82.0861°W	02:39–02:42	1.99 mi (3.20 km)	200 yd (180 m)	$50,000	Two mobile homes and a house were heavily damaged and several other houses were also damaged, some by fallen trees.

== December ==
Confirmed tornadoes by Enhanced Fujita rating
EFU	EF0	EF1	EF2	EF3	EF4	EF5	Total
0	12	10	5	5	0	0	32

=== December 1 event ===
List of confirmed tornadoes – Wednesday, December 1, 2010
EF#	Location	County / Parish	State	Start Coord.	Time (UTC)	Path length	Max width	Damage	Summary
EF0	Waldorf	Charles	MD	38.6262°N 76.9655°W	1427–1429	2.31 mi (3.72 km)	50 yd (46 m)	$10,000	Two houses sustained minor damage, a basketball goal was knocked over, and trees were downed near Mill Hill Estates.

=== December 14 event ===
List of confirmed tornadoes – Tuesday, December 14, 2010
EF#	Location	County / Parish	State	Start Coord.	Time (UTC)	Path length	Max width	Damage	Summary
EF2	Aumsville	Marion	OR	44.8398°N 122.8789°W	1940–1950	5 mi (8.0 km)	150 yd (140 m)	$1,200,000	A rare West Coast significant (EF2+) tornado caused significant damage in Aumsville. At least 50 houses and businesses were damaged, some severely, along with five sheds. Two semi-trailers tipped over, and more than larger trees were downed. Two people sustained minor injuries.

=== December 30 event ===
List of confirmed tornadoes – Thursday, December 30, 2010
EF#	Location	County / Parish	State	Start Coord.	Time (UTC)	Path length	Max width
EF0	NW of Blue Eye	Stone	MO	36.5254°N 93.4262°W	05:19–05:24	0.25 mi (0.40 km)	30 yd (27 m)
EF0	A framed home and a mobile home both sustained minor damage. Additional damage was inflicted upon two large farm gas tanks, a stock trailer, and an outbuilding.						
EF1	E of Lampe to S of Notch	Stone	MO	36.5706°N 93.3742°W	05:26–05:40	3.15 mi (5.07 km)	300 yd (270 m)
EF1	A tornado tracked along the shoreline of a peninsula within Table Rock Lake, damaging or destroying 11 boat docks. Within these docks, 25 boats sustained damage. Around sixty homes suffered minor to moderate roof damage, though one well-built home was unroofed.						

== See also ==
- Tornadoes of 2010
