= Tornadoes of 2010 =

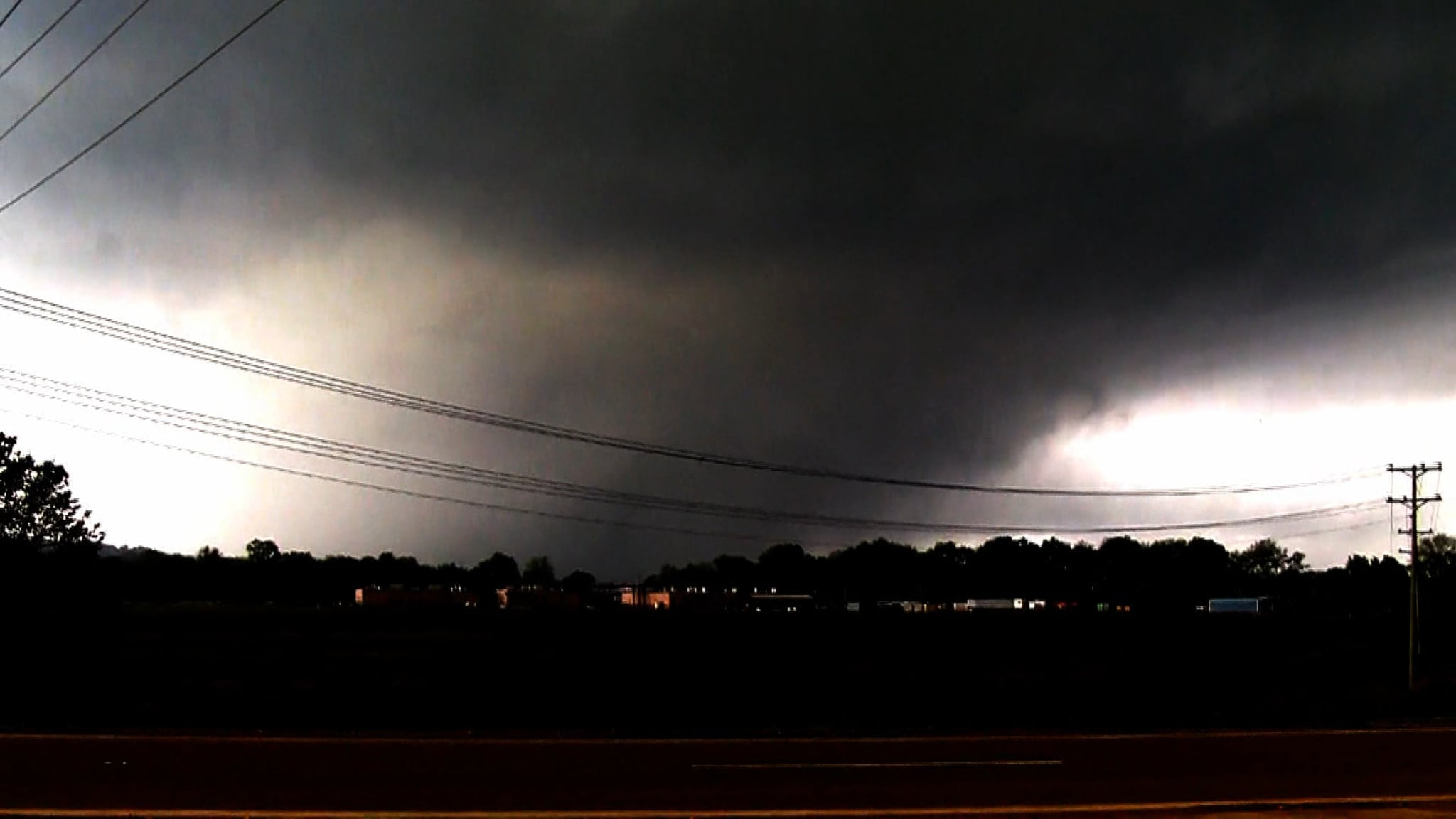
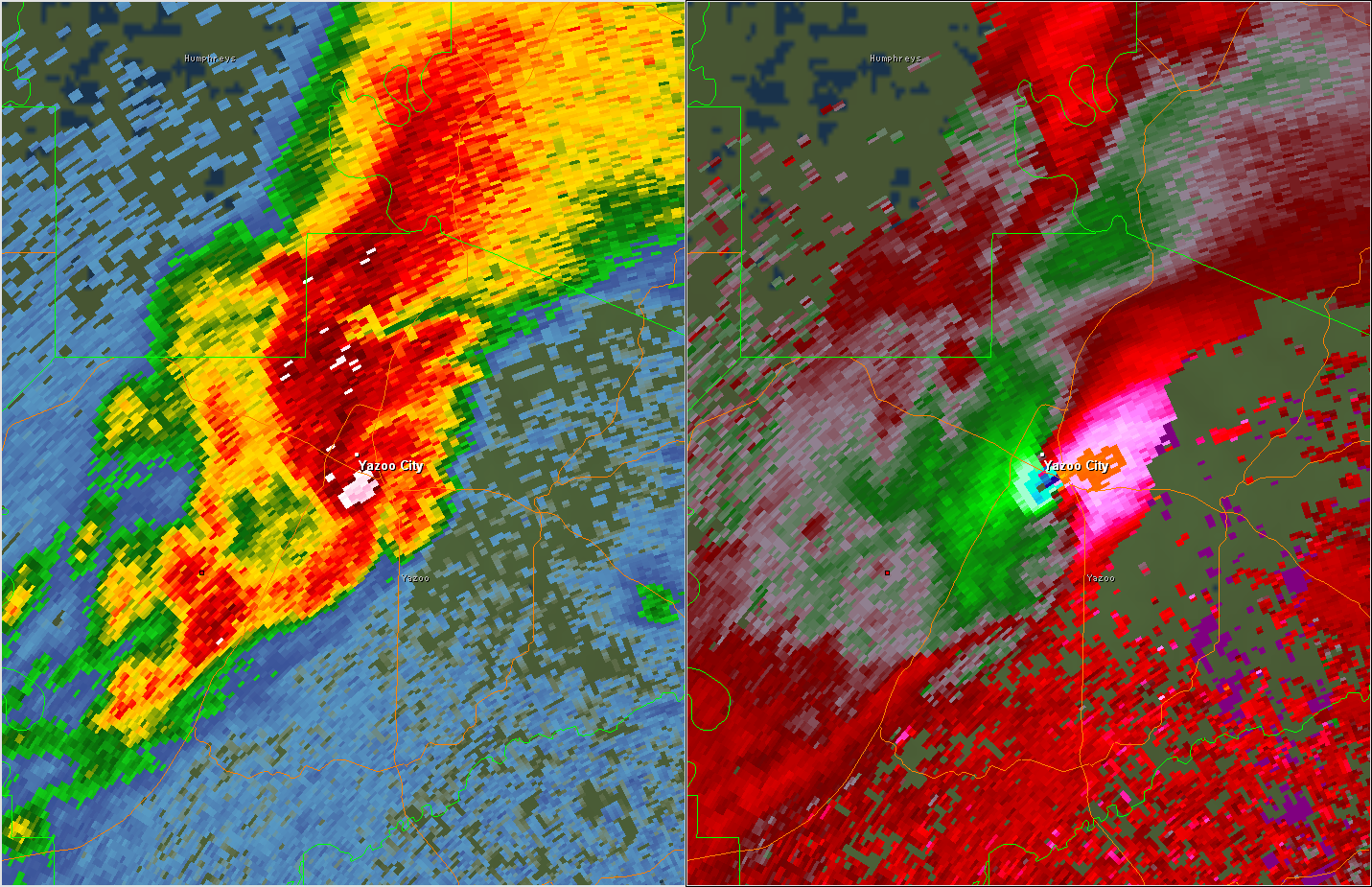
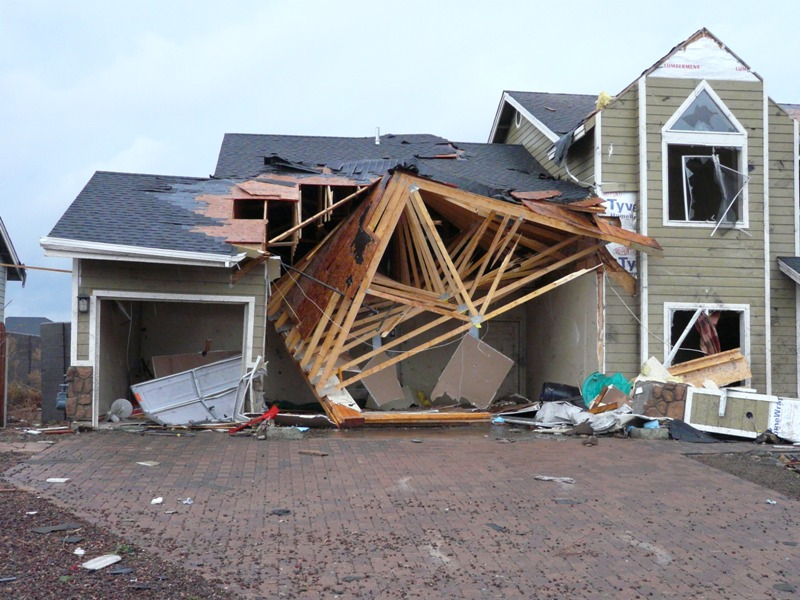
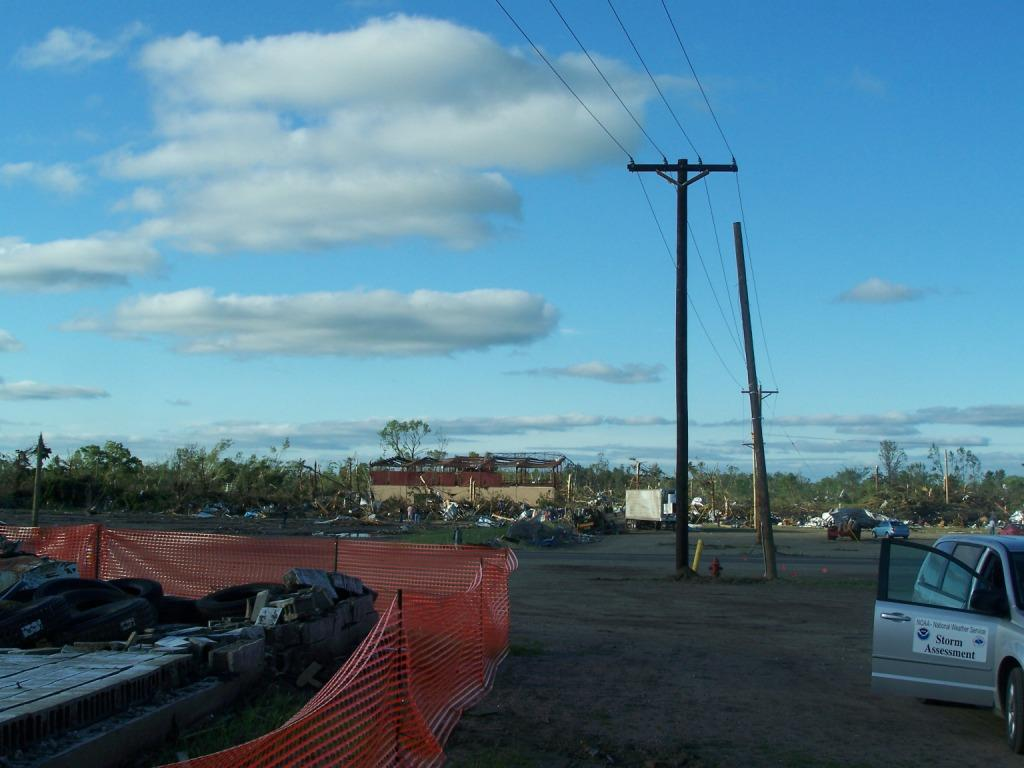
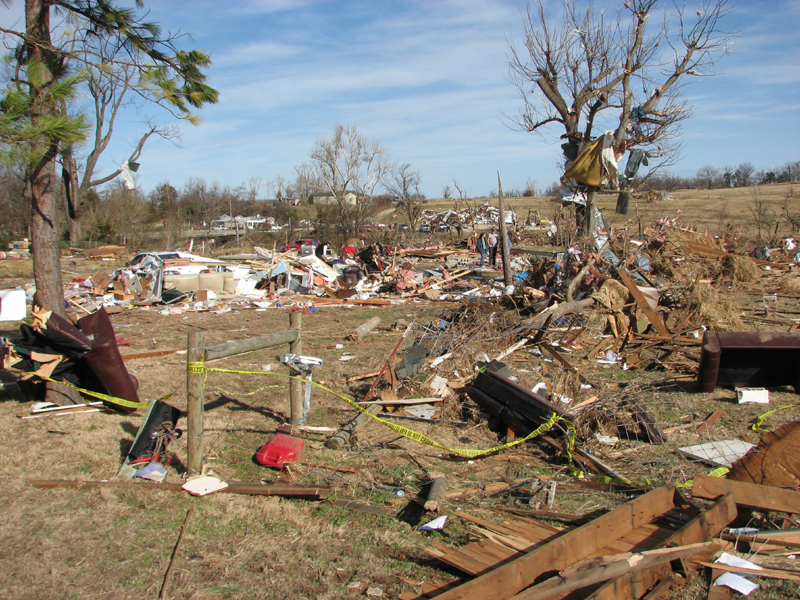
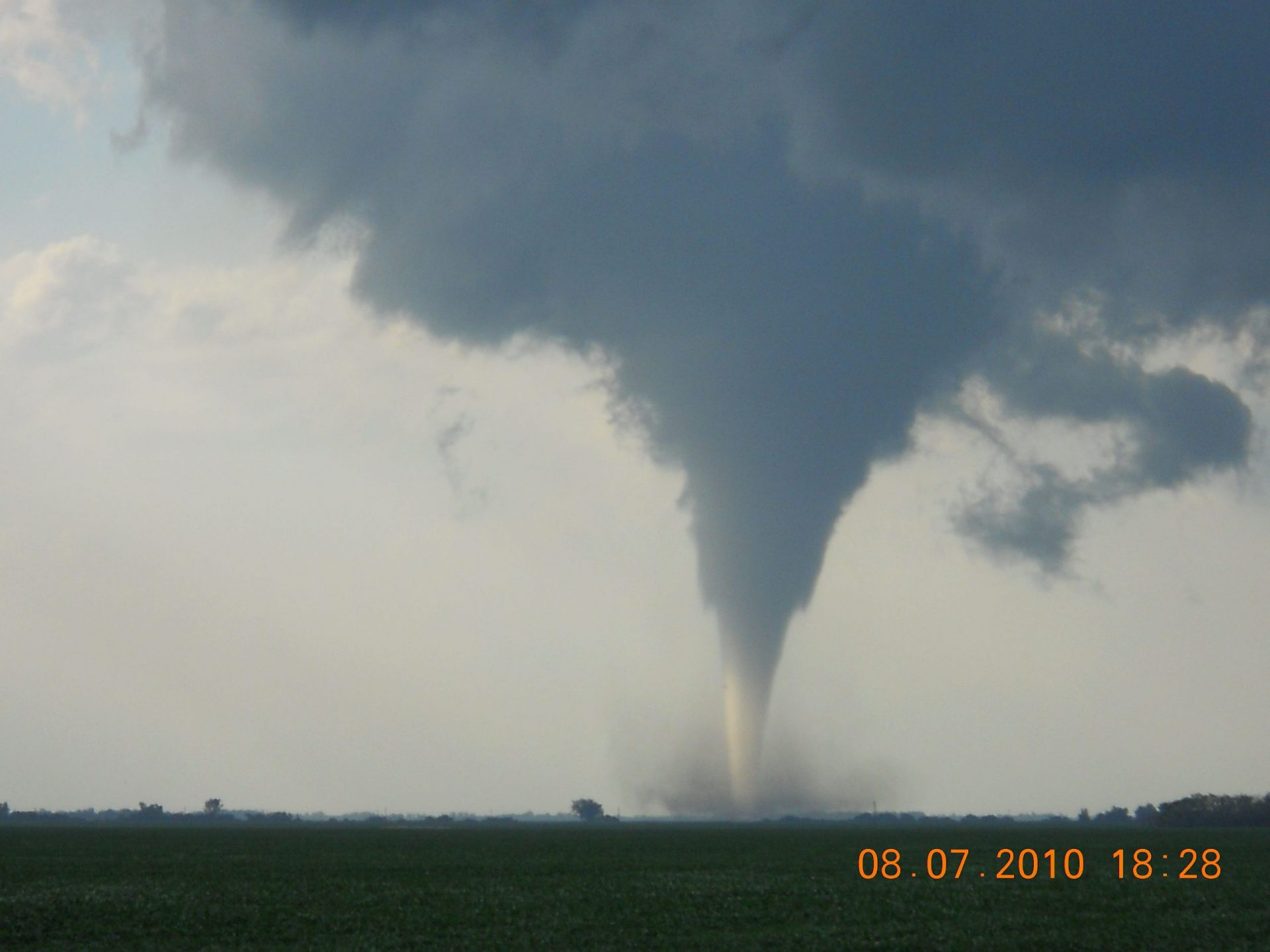
- Clockwise from top: a massive EF4 tornado near Yazoo City, Mississippi on April 24; EF2 damage to a home in Bellemont, Arizona after a tornado on October 6; Damage in Cincinnati, Arkansas following an EF3 tornado on December 31; a violent drill-bit tornado near Doran, Minnesota on August 7; Damage in Wadena, Minnesota from an EF4 tornado on June 17; NEXRAD imagery of the previously mentioned violent tornado hitting Yazoo City, Mississippi.
- Timespan: January 19 – December 31, 2010
- Maximum rated tornado: EF4 tornado: List; Yazoo City–Durant, Mississippi on April 24; Collinsville, Alabama on April 25; Choctaw, Oklahoma on May 10; Little Axe, Oklahoma on May 10; Bowdle, South Dakota on May 22; Millbury, Ohio on June 5; Bluffton, Minnesota on June 17; Holmes, North Dakota on June 17; Conger, Minnesota on June 17; Wadena, Minnesota on June 17; Sibley, Iowa on June 25; Doran, Minnesota on August 7; Atlanta, Louisiana on November 29
- Tornadoes in U.S.: 1,282
- Damage (U.S.): $1.07 billion (2010 US$)
- Fatalities (U.S.): 45
- Fatalities (worldwide): 190

This page documents the tornadoes and tornado outbreaks of 2010. The majority of tornadoes form in the U.S., but they can occur almost anywhere under the right conditions. A lesser number occur outside the U.S., most notably in parts of neighboring southern Canada during the Northern Hemisphere's summer season, but are also known in South America, Europe, Asia, and Australia.

There were 1,282 tornadoes confirmed in the United States in 2010, with 45 confirmed fatalities. Elsewhere in the world, 190 people were killed in tornadoes: 128 in India, 51 in China, six in Argentina, three in the Bahamas and one each in Bangladesh and Germany. The year was near average for tornadoes despite an extremely quiet early spring period, however such changed after a huge upswing starting in late April and a busy late spring and summer period. The autumn months were slightly above average.

== Synopsis ==
The year started with above-normal activity in January, primarily as a result of a single moderate outbreak late in the month. After that, arctic air settled in across the central and southern United States, suppressing warm air to the Caribbean, and as a result, February saw only one isolated tornado as the air mass throughout the month was highly unfavorable for any severe weather development. In early March, predictions for an active tornado season were voiced by meteorologists should the pattern continue as it had during January and February, with El Nino also cited as possibly bringing an above average season. However, March and the first half of April also had well below normal activity, and overall the early spring period was among the least active in recent years. Through mid-April, the season had been one of the least active in the historical record (see graphic above right).

Two very large tornado outbreaks in late April ended the slow period, pushing April activity to near normal. May, which is typically the most active month for tornado activity, was somewhat above normal, as several larger outbreaks were spread throughout the month. June was a very active month with at least one isolated tornado activity on most days and two major tornado outbreaks plus several smaller outbreaks resulting in well over 400 tornado reports. The active pattern continued into July, with activity again above normal due to steady activity throughout the month despite no major outbreaks. The active pattern came to a stop by August, with below-normal activity. September was also slightly below to near average, with only modest tropical activity contributing. The fall months were moderately active, although October was one of the most active on record as the result of one single outbreak late in the month. November and December were both above average with most of the activity clustered in two outbreaks, one at the end of each month, with both months generally inactive until those tornado outbreaks.

== Events ==
=== United States yearly total ===
Confirmed tornadoes by Enhanced Fujita rating
EFU	EF0	EF1	EF2	EF3	EF4	EF5	Total
0	768	342	127	32	13	0	1,282

Fatal United States tornadoes in 2010
- Approximate touchdown location of killer tornadoes in 2010 Summary of tornadoes: March 10 – Arkansas (1 death); April 24 – Louisiana, Mississippi (10 deaths); April 30 – Arkansas (1 death); May 2 – Mississippi, Tennessee (3 deaths); May 2 – Mississippi (1 death); May 10 – Oklahoma (2 deaths); May 10 – Oklahoma (1 death); June 5 – Ohio (7 deaths); June 5 – Illinois (1 death); June 17 – Minnesota (1 death); June 17 – Minnesota (1 death); June 17 – Minnesota (1 death); June 27 – Michigan (1 death); July 26 – Montana (2 deaths); August 12 – North Dakota (1 death); September 16 – Ohio, West Virginia (1 death); September 16 – New York (1 death); December 31 – Oklahoma, Arkansas (4 deaths); December 31 – Missouri (2 deaths); December 31 – Missouri (2 deaths); December 31 – Missouri (1 death); Total fatalities: 45

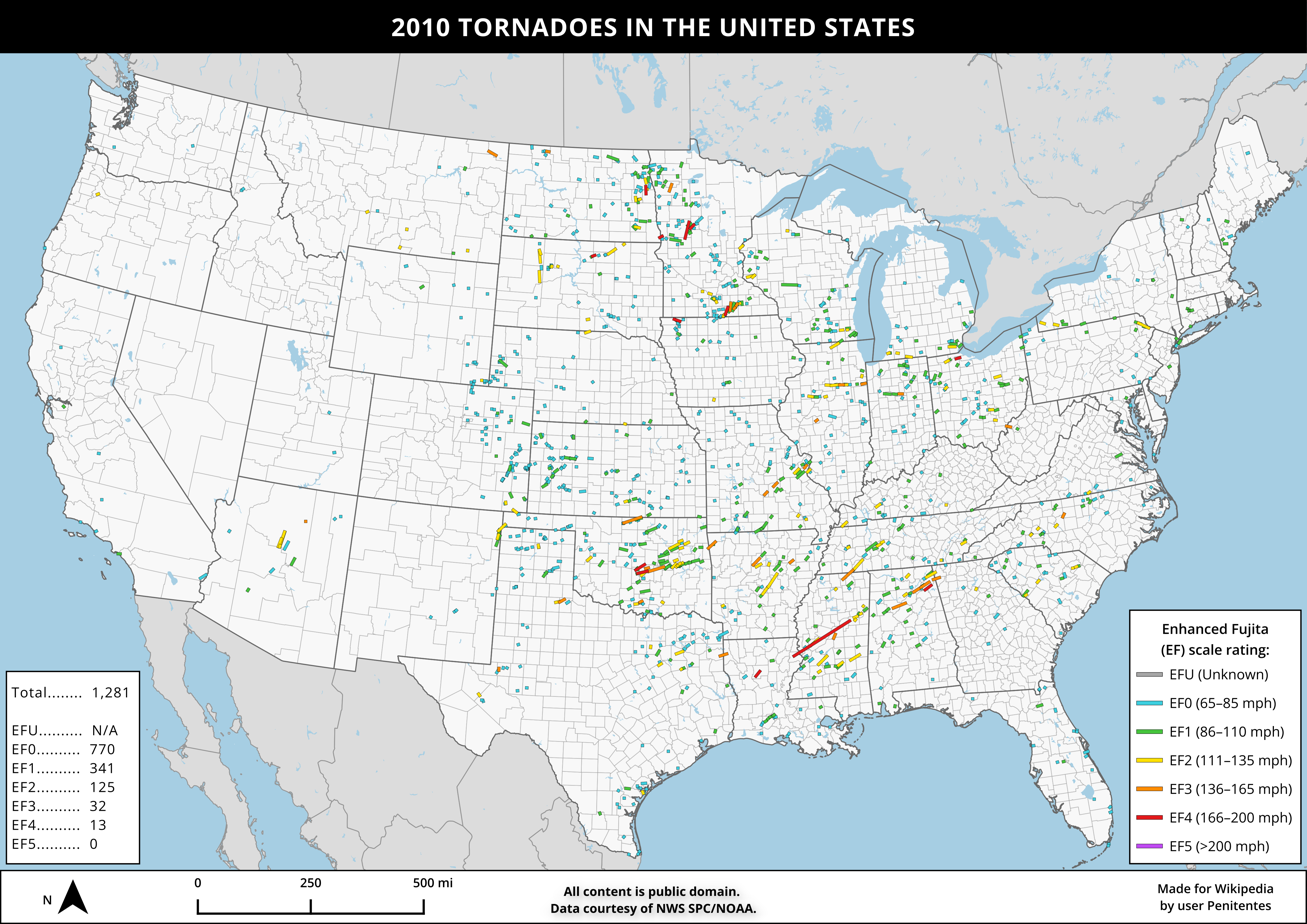
A map of 2010 United States tornado paths from the results of storm surveys.
- Interactive map

A chart of the 2010 United States tornado count estimated from the number of preliminary reports

== January ==
There were 41 tornadoes reported in the US in January, of which 30 were confirmed.

=== January 19–21 (Southern California) ===
EFU	EF0	EF1	EF2	EF3	EF4	EF5
0	4	2	0	0	0	0

An outbreak of weak tornadoes occurred between Santa Barbara and Orange Counties in Southern California on January 19 and continued into January 21. The outbreak was from the result of a vigorous Pacific storm system that moved into the Los Angeles metropolitan area on January 18. EF1 damage was reported to the Huntington Beach harbor area in Orange County, and in Santa Barbara County a local radio station reported that a sheriff's deputy had sighted a possible tornado, with roof damage near the Ocean Meadow Golf Course. A third tornado was reported by the public in Orange County, with cars overturned on the Pacific Coast Highway and roof damage in the area. Additional tornadoes were reported from a different system on January 21, with damage reported in Blythe, California, and Santa Barbara, California. Tornadoes were also confirmed on January 18 and January 23.

=== January 20–22 (Southeast US) ===
EFU	EF0	EF1	EF2	EF3	EF4	EF5
0	12	6	4	1	0	0

A separate system developed in the south-central US on January 20 in an unstable air mass. Numerous tornadoes were reported, with severe damage particularly around Waskom, Texas, from an EF3 tornado where buildings were destroyed and people reported trapped but were not injured. Other tornadoes were reported in East Texas and Louisiana. Significant damage also took place in LaRue, Texas, and Canton, Texas, both from EF2 tornadoes. As many as 150 homes were damaged in Van Zandt County, Texas. As many as fifty homes in Hopkins County, Texas suffered roof damage.

As the cyclone tracked east, additional storms developed on the afternoon of January 21 in central Tennessee and northern Alabama, with two tornadoes reported in these areas. Significant damage was reported in the Five Points neighborhood of Huntsville and in downtown Huntsville from these storms. The tornado in Huntsville was rated an EF2.

== February ==
There was one confirmed tornado reported in the US in February. This set a new monthly record low for February.

=== February 17 (Bangladesh) ===
A tornado tore through 22 villages in Maheshpur, Bangladesh damaging about 1,250 homes and several acres of crops. The tornado killed a child and injured around 150 other people.

== March ==
There were 37 tornadoes reported in the US in March, of which 34 were confirmed.

=== March 8 ===
EFU	EF0	EF1	EF2	EF3	EF4	EF5
0	1	0	1	0	0	0

A tornado touched down near the town of Hammon in Roger Mills County, Oklahoma, on the early evening of March 8 and was reported by spotters around 5:29 pm CST. The tornado tore roofs off at least four homes and caused damage to other structures in Hammon, according to Oklahoma Department of Emergency Management officials with the Roger Mills County Sheriff's Office reporting the county barn was destroyed, leaving behind significant debris. Another home was destroyed with only the center portion remaining. No injuries were reported with the storm. This tornado was officially rated an EF2 by the NWS. A second tornado was reported just north of Butler in Dewey County, Oklahoma, at 6:17 pm CST, it was rated EF0. The tornadoes formed from a low-top supercell and occurred while temperatures were in the mid-to-upper 50s (near 15 °C) in the affected areas, which normally does not favor tornadic development; though the storm was in a narrow instability axis in Western Oklahoma that developed due to clearing from earlier thunderstorms.

=== March 10–11 ===
EFU	EF0	EF1	EF2	EF3	EF4	EF5
0	4	9	1	0	0	0

Severe weather developed from the northern Gulf Coast up to the Ozarks. The hardest-hit state was Arkansas, where a long-lived supercell tracked across the state, producing at least three tornadoes with houses destroyed. A 79-year-old man was killed and at least three others were injured from an EF2 tornado in Cleburne County. It was the first killer tornado in the US since October 9, 2009. More tornadoes continued to touchdown throughout the night of March 10. In Independence County an EF1 tornado touched down near the town of Rosie. This tornado was short-lived, but destroyed chicken houses killing or displacing 80,000 chickens. Two tornadoes touched down in White County both rated EF1. The first touched down around 8:25 (CDT) near Center Hill. This tornado destroyed at least nine houses and injured one person. The second tornado was short lived and touched down near the town of Steprock. The final tornado to touchdown in Arkansas touched down in Saline County near the town of Congo; this tornado was rated EF1.

=== March 28–29 ===
EFU	EF0	EF1	EF2	EF3	EF4	EF5
0	3	4	3	1	0	0

A low pressure system pushed northward through the Ohio Valley on March 28. Several tornadoes were reported in the warm sector stretching from North Carolina south to Florida. The Piedmont Triad was hardest hit, and a tornado emergency was declared for parts of Forsyth, Randolph, Davidson, and Guilford counties. There, a mobile home park was heavily damaged with many injuries reported near High Point. At least 200 houses were also damaged by that EF3 tornado. Damage was also reported near Charlotte. An EF2 tornado hit Linwood in Davidson County.

The same system produced a weak EF0 tornado on the morning of March 29 in South Florida and at least one, possibly two, tornadoes at Freeport on Grand Bahama Island in the Bahamas. The Freeport Container Port was heavily damaged, and three people were killed and several others injured by that tornado. That tornado has not been rated on either the Fujita scale or the Enhanced Fujita scale.

== April ==
There were 197 tornadoes reported in the US in April, of which 139 were confirmed.

=== April 8 ===
EFU	EF0	EF1	EF2	EF3	EF4	EF5
0	6	2	0	0	0	0

Isolated severe weather occurred across southern Alabama, southern Georgia, and northern Florida during the afternoon and evening of April 8, 2010. The synoptic pattern that led to the convection, consisted of mid and upper level troughing over much of the eastern United States, and an associated surface cold front advancing eastward along the northern Gulf of Mexico coast. Shortwave energy was rounding the base of the longwave trough through the day and was the main trigger for the vigorous convection.

The first tornadic thunderstorms across the forecast area developed early in the afternoon over Coffee County, Alabama. A weak EF0 tornado first touched down just east of SR 87. The next area of damage was reported east northeast from this initial touchdown along CR-611, where a barn was destroyed and several trees snapped. The final area of damage was reported north of Alabama Highway 134, where a roof was taken off the porch of a house along with a portion of the roof over the kitchen. Figure 2 shows the 0.5 degree reflectivity and storm relative velocity from the KEOX WSR-88D radar shortly before the tornado. A pronounced rotational couplet (mesocyclone) is seen in the velocity image near Damascus, Alabama.

The second tornado of the day developed from a fast-moving storm that crossed Gadsden County, Florida, during mid-afternoon. This tornado was also brief and rated EF0. The tornado touched down in the vicinity of Quincy, just southwest of State Road 267, and tracked northeast onto Holt Lane. Damage southwest of Holt Lane was limited to trees either snapped or uprooted. A few structures were damaged on Holt Lane, primarily due to falling trees. One outbuilding lost its roof as a result of the tornado. The tornado continued northeast, crossing Interstate 10 near exit 181. Trees were reported uprooted or snapped on both sides of the highway. The tornado appears to have lifted shortly after crossing the Interstate.

With the instability and shear ahead of the cold front, a line of showers and thunderstorms developed, and at 4:50 pm produced an EF1 tornado with winds of 80 to 90 miles an hour. The damage spanned a 2-mile long and up to 50 yard wide path across Morgan County, Georgia, from High Shoals Road to the Apalachee River.

Five homes and one chicken house were damaged, and five outbuildings were either damaged or destroyed. The most severely damaged house was located approximately in the middle of the two mile path. The front porch of the house was destroyed, a portion of the roof had been blown off, and a tree fell on the back of the house. Other damage included shingles ripped off roofs, a few broken windows, and some tree limbs driven into roofs and outer walls.

=== April 15 (India) ===
A tornado with winds between 80 and 125 km/h (50 and 78 mph) tore through numerous villages in the Indian States of Bihar and West Bengal during the night of April 15, killing 128 people. The tornado was caused by the 2010 Eastern Indian storm.

=== April 22–25 ===
EFU	EF0	EF1	EF2	EF3	EF4	EF5
0	56	17	9	4	2	0

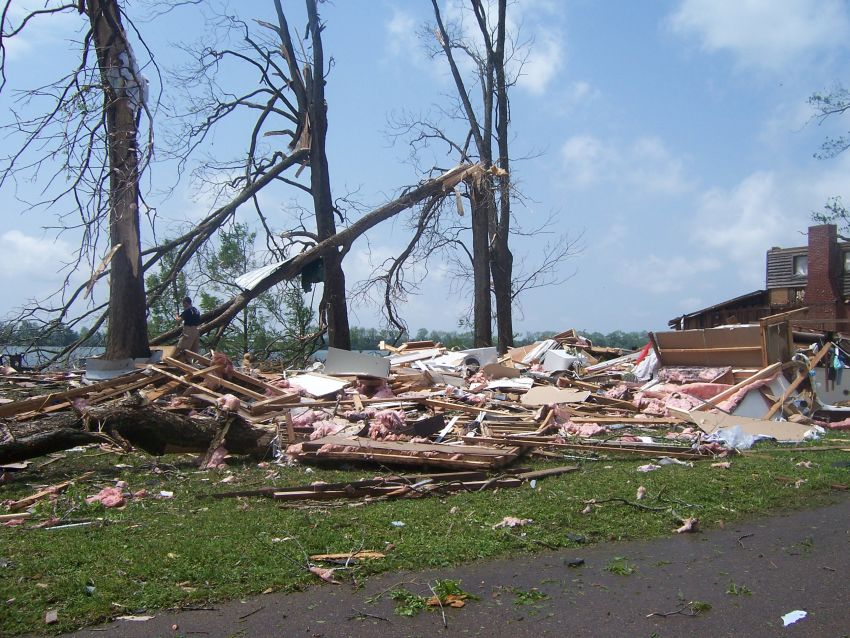
Damage from a tornado in central Mississippi

A complex weather system began to track across the central and southern United States beginning on April 22. That afternoon, tornadoes developed across eastern Colorado and from western Kansas southward to the Texas Panhandle. As instability increased, a moderate risk of severe weather – the first such upgrade of 2010 – was issued for the area around Amarillo, Texas. The largest tornado, rated EF2, was reported near Kendall, Kansas, reported as 1-mile (1.6 km) wide according to KSNG coverage. Another large wedge tornado was reported near Friend, Kansas, and tracked to Scott City, Kansas, where several farm buildings were destroyed. Forty tornadoes were reported that day.

Another moderate risk of severe weather was issued for April 23 across much of the southern United States. Eighteen tornadoes were reported; most of them north of St. Louis, Missouri, outside the moderate risk area.

A high risk of severe weather had been issued for April 24. High risk days are rarely issued. Four "particularly dangerous situation" tornado watches were issued that day for areas of Missouri, Kentucky, Illinois, Arkansas, Louisiana, Mississippi, Tennessee, and Alabama. Numerous tornado warnings citing "large and extremely dangerous" tornadoes were issued. A tornado emergency was issued for central Mississippi for a tornado that reportedly flattened 30 homes near Eagle Bend in Warren County, leveled numerous buildings, injured numerous people, and destroyed a church with Yazoo City. The 165 mile long wedge (at peak as wide as 1.75 miles) was rated EF4. Ten people were killed, including four in Yazoo County, one in Holmes County, and five in Choctaw County. Significant damage to an industrial plant with injuries, trapped people and destroyed homes were reported in Madison Parish, Louisiana, near the Louisiana-Mississippi state line. Seventy-seven tornadoes were reported that day.

Dr. Greg Forbes of the Weather Channel said that the radar was picking up debris on a thunderstorm near Yazoo City, indicating extreme damage. He said he has not seen anything like that since a tornado hit Greensburg, Kansas.

The National Weather Service also confirmed two tornado touchdowns in the St. Louis, Missouri, area on April 24, 2010, both were rated as EF0 with the strongest winds recorded at 85 mph. One touchdown was in the Des Peres area while the other touched down in the University City area. No injuries were reported from the tornadoes. The tornadoes knocked down some power lines and trees and caused mostly minor damages to homes and businesses.

=== April 29 – May 2 ===
EFU	EF0	EF1	EF2	EF3	EF4	EF5
0	21	24	12	3	0	0

A strong low pressure system tracked across the Midwest beginning on April 29. A few tornadoes were reported from Kansas to Iowa that day, but with little damage.

A moderate risk of severe weather was issued on April 30 for a large swath from northern Illinois to southern Arkansas. Late that afternoon, tornadoes began to develop across the Ozarks and multiple tornado warnings were issued. Also, in less than a week, another PDS Tornado Watch was issued for Arkansas, Oklahoma, the Missouri Bootheel, and Texas. That evening in central Arkansas, the moderate risk was upgraded to a high risk for the second time in less than a week. Significant damage was reported in several areas. KARK coverage reported that a tornado touched down in Scotland, Arkansas, and major damage, at least 25 injuries and at least one fatality were reported there. In East End, Arkansas, major damage was also reported with several injuries.

Another high risk was issued for May 1 for Arkansas, northern Mississippi, West Tennessee, southwestern Kentucky and southeastern Missouri, the first occurrence of back-to-back high risk days since 2006. Activity began in the afternoon on the warm front, where a destructive tornado touched down in northeastern Mississippi with severe damage near Ripley. Yet again, another PDS Tornado watch was issued for Arkansas, Louisiana, and Texas.

== May ==
There were 290 tornadoes reported in the US in May, of which 304 were confirmed. The higher final total is due to a large number of late reports.

=== May 6 ===
At least 51 people were killed after a tornado, hail storms, gale-force winds and torrential rains causing mudslides hit southern China, damaging thousands of homes and destroying crops. The number of people killed by the tornado itself is unknown. Twenty-nine people were killed in Chongqing municipality, where the tornado is reported to have occurred.

=== May 10–13 ===
EFU	EF0	EF1	EF2	EF3	EF4	EF5
0	39	33	13	4	2	0

An intense trough with dry line activity moved across the southern plains, especially Oklahoma and Kansas, on May 10. For the fourth time in less than three weeks, a high risk of severe weather was issued. Large tornadoes began developing in the mid-afternoon hours in northern Oklahoma, with significant damage in Medford, Oklahoma, by an EF3. Another tornado touched down near Yukon, Oklahoma, in the western part of the Oklahoma City metropolitan area, followed by numerous others in the area. A trailer park was flattened near Norman, Oklahoma, according to KWTV coverage, with at least one fatality and many injuries reported. This tornado was soon rated as an EF4. Within three hours, at least 34 reports of tornadoes, including a few "large and extremely dangerous" tornadoes, were reported. A large grocery store along Highway 9 near Norman was flattened by a large tornado. A long-lived supercell tracked parallel to Interstate 40, and produced one or more large and destructive tornadoes from the Oklahoma City metro area through eastern Oklahoma. Activity slowed down the next day as only 2 tornadoes were reported in Ohio. However, on May 12, tornado activity increased. A dry line moved through west Texas, causing multiple tornadoes in Texas, Kansas, and Oklahoma. Finally, on May 13, the dry line dissipated, but many tornadoes still formed on that day. One tornado in Missouri was rated an EF1 after it destroyed a casino park and a Pizza Hut location. Activity died down the next day as now flooding was more associated with the storm system than tornadoes.

=== May 14–16 ===
EFU	EF0	EF1	EF2	EF3	EF4	EF5
0	11	1	0	1	0	0

On May 14, a tornado formed in New Mexico at the tail end of an occluded front that had produced tornadoes in Oklahoma earlier in the week. The next day, on May 15, an EF0 tornado touched down SW of LaPlace, Louisiana, with an injury reported. 3 possible tornadoes formed in Colorado and Wyoming. Another tornado, with some accounts of a waterspout moving onshore, formed near the Gulfport–Biloxi International Airport in Mississippi. On May 16, a tornado formed in Nebraska and other reports of tornadoes were located in Missouri and in Kansas.

=== May 18–21 ===
EFU	EF0	EF1	EF2	EF3	EF4	EF5
0	32	9	2	0	0	0

Another round of severe weather developed across the High Plains on May 18. At least 25 tornadoes were reported from Wyoming to the Texas Panhandle including just outside the Denver metropolitan area. However, most of the tornadoes were in open country, and damage was generally minimal.

More severe weather was expected on May 19, particularly over Oklahoma and North Texas. A high risk of severe weather and a PDS tornado watch was issued for central Oklahoma as a result. Numerous tornadoes were reported across the area, although only a few resulted in significant damage as a forecasted major tornado outbreak did not occur.

=== May 22–25 ===
EFU	EF0	EF1	EF2	EF3	EF4	EF5
0	54	13	10	0	1	0

The severe weather shifted north as a new low pressure system tracked across the northern Plains states on May 22. Isolated tornadoes were reported across portions of central South Dakota that afternoon. The most intense supercell produced a long-lived wedge tornado in and around Bowdle, South Dakota, where numerous houses and farm buildings were destroyed and cars were thrown into the air. It was rated as an EF4, but mostly remained in rural the countryside and no injuries were reported.

=== May 24 (Germany) ===
FU	F0	F1	F2	F3	F4	F5
0	0	3	1	1	0	0

A tornado outbreak struck the eastern German states of Brandenburg and Saxony on May 24. A wide F2 – F3 tornado moved along ca. 100 km distance between the region of Torgau in northern Saxony and east of Dresden near the Czech border. Most damage occurred in the Brandenburg town of Mühlberg and the Saxon town of Großenhain, as well as in Belgern and Radeburg. A six-year-old girl was killed in Großenhain when a tree limb fell on the car she was sitting in. The Mühlberg monastery church was "substantially damaged" by the 300 meter wide tornado there; a "hall" collapsed in Großenhain, along with serious damage to a concrete slab apartment building. Damage in Großenhain alone was estimated at topping 8 million Euro, with over 3000 buildings damaged. 38 people were injured, with schools closed the next day. The bridge at Mühlberg, linking the two states, was also closed temporarily due to damage to its guardrails.

== June ==
There were 428 tornadoes reported in the US in June, of which 325 were confirmed.

=== June 1 ===
EFU	EF0	EF1	EF2	EF3	EF4	EF5
0	3	1	1	0	0	0

On June 1, a cold front moved into the Iowa-Nebraska area, causing severe weather across much of the region. The strongest tornado that day was an EF2 tornado that hit Ringgold County. 2 other tornadoes, rated EF0 and EF1, were confirmed in eastern Nebraska.

=== June 2 ===
EFU	EF0	EF1	EF2	EF3	EF4	EF5
0	5	2	1	0	0	0

An EF1 tornado was confirmed in the Bergholz area on June 2. It was part of a severe weather situation from a squall line that moved into Ohio. The tornado damaged some houses and destroyed several trees. Although there were no human fatalities, 2 horses were confirmed killed by flying debris. 2 additional tornadoes formed near the Texas coastline from another squall line, rated EF0 near the Chapman Ranch, Texas, and EF2 in Refugio, Texas. And 2 more confirmed tornadoes near Woodsboro, Texas, an EF0 and near Tynan, Texas, an EF1 One more tornado was confirmed near Shin Pond, Maine, that damaged many trees.

=== June 3 (Australia) ===
A waterspout moved onshore as a tornado at Lennox Head, New South Wales. At least 40 houses were damaged, but unofficial numbers have risen to 100, and several people were injured by the tornado.

=== June 5–6 (United States and Canada) ===
EFU	EF0	EF1	EF2	EF3	EF4	EF5
0	18	20	11	3	1	0

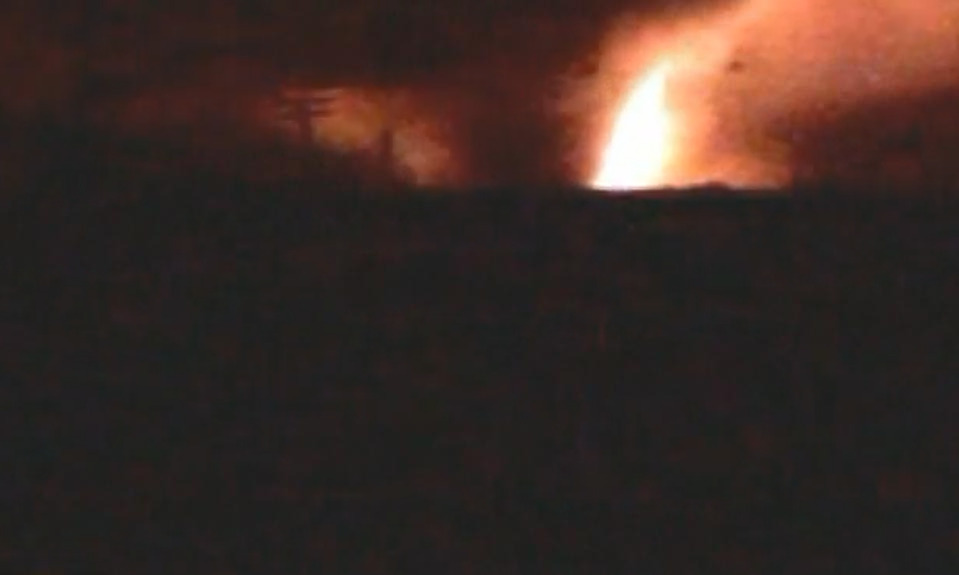
A nocturnal tornado being illuminated by a powerflash near Millbury, Ohio on June 5.

More severe weather developed across the Midwest on June 5. A few tornadoes developed primarily in Ohio that afternoon, but the most serious activity developed that evening. Several tornadoes took place in Iowa and more in Illinois. One especially large tornado resulted in a tornado emergency being declared that evening for Peoria, Illinois, after causing severe damage in Elmwood, Illinois. A second strong tornado formed shortly after the Elmwood, Illinois tornado in Putnam County just west of Henry, Illinois. The tornado tracked through southern La Salle County where it caused significant damage (EF2) in Magnolia, Illinois. A family of tornadoes (EF0, EF2, and EF3) struck the town of Streator, Illinois, resulting in widespread destruction throughout the area. Another tornado family (Two EF0's and one EF2) impacted Dwight, Illinois, where 1 person was killed, numerous homes were destroyed, and a train was derailed. Later that night, a pair of twin tornadoes (EF1 and EF3) near St. Anne, Illinois, destroyed many homes and mobile homes, snapped trees, demolished barns and farm equipment, and injured one person. Several more tornado warnings were issued in Southern Michigan that night, and into the early morning. Counties under warnings included Calhoun, Kalamazoo, Hillsdale, Jackson, Branch, Berrien, Van Buren, Saint Joseph, Washtenaw, Wayne, and Monroe counties. An EF1 tornado in Calhoun County touched down just south of Battle Creek, downing trees and tearing the roof off of a church. Other damage reported in Calhoun County included a flagpole bent at a right angle due to extreme winds in Homer. A damaging EF2 tornado struck the town of Dundee, Michigan, where multiple businesses and a water park were damaged and 11 people were injured. Throughout the town, many trees were downed and homes were damaged or destroyed. A state of emergency was also declared for the town of Leamington, Ontario, after extensive damage was reported across the southern part of Essex County, Ontario, due to an F1 or possible F2 tornado confirmed by Environment Canada. Seven people were confirmed dead in Wood County, Ohio, just outside Toledo after an EF4 tornado hit the town of Millbury, Ohio, in the middle of the night.

=== June 16–18 ===
EFU	EF0	EF1	EF2	EF3	EF4	EF5
0	37	28	9	4	4	0

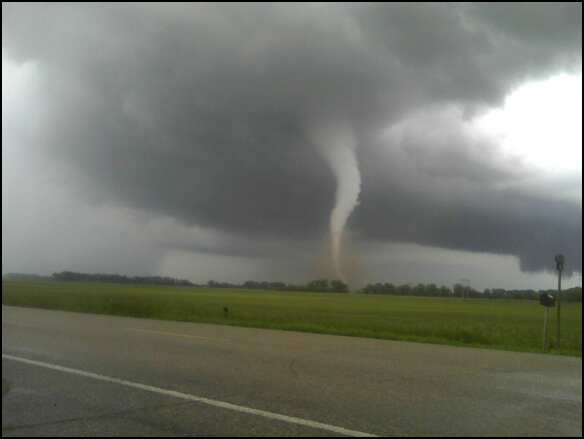
An EF4 tornado near Holmes, North Dakota.

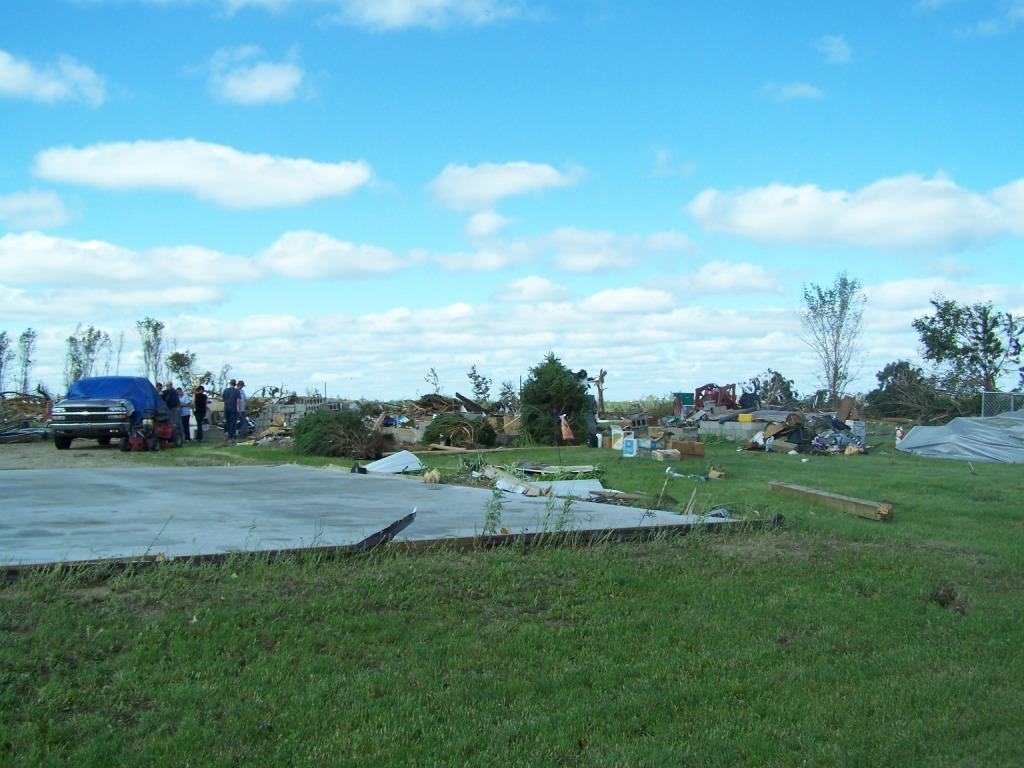
A destroyed farmstead in eastern Otter Tail County, Minnesota after a long-track EF4 tornado.

An intense low pressure system developed across the northern Plains states and impacted the region on June 16–17. Eighty-two tornadoes touched down over the two days, primarily across North Dakota and Minnesota on June 17. Significant damage was reported west of Grand Forks, North Dakota, and in the Wadena, Minnesota, area, and a tornado emergency was issued for areas north of Wadena and again later for areas near Plummer, Minnesota, where significant damage was reported. Much of Wadena was destroyed by its tornado. Three people were killed; one in Almora, Minnesota, one in Mentor, Minnesota; and a third in Freeborn County, Minnesota. Four of the tornadoes were rated EF4, the most violent tornadoes in a single event since February 5–6, 2008. This outbreak spawned a record 48 tornadoes in Minnesota on June 17, breaking the state's previous single-day record of 27 tornadoes set during the Mid-June 1992 tornado outbreak.

=== June 20–21 ===
EFU	EF0	EF1	EF2	EF3	EF4	EF5
0	23	5	3	0	0	0

An unsettled pattern continued across a large part of the US, with widespread isolated tornadoes across various parts of the Plain states. The most notable tornado touched down in Billings, Montana, at the MetraPark trade facility. Damage was significant there from that EF2 tornado, including a large section of the roof being removed at the Rimrock Auto Arena at MetraPark.

Another day of scattered tornadoes took place on June 21, both in the northern Plains and in the Midwest. A total of 29 tornadoes were reported, but most were weak and damage was minor. However, the village of Eagle, Wisconsin, sustained serious damage after being hit by an EF2 tornado. Old World Wisconsin, a state historic site, was obliterated by the tornado.

=== June 23–24 ===
EFU	EF0	EF1	EF2	EF3	EF4	EF5
0	5	9	1	0	0	0

Yet another severe weather event developed on June 23 in the Great Lakes region. Although most of the activity was related to damaging winds, supercells formed ahead of the storm especially in central Ontario. Severe damage took place in and around Midland, Ontario, with a mobile home park severely damaged and many injuries reported from an EF2 tornado. 150 people were displaced and the mayor declared a state of emergency in the town. Another EF1 tornado touched down near Washago, Ontario Shortly after the tornado struck, Emergency Management of Ontario issued a rare Red Alert in a huge swath of Central Ontario due to tornado threats—urging people in that area to take cover.

Related to the storm system mentioned above that spawned tornadoes in Midland, but a separate group of cells, was a strong line of thunderstorms that quickly fired up during the heat of the afternoon in northern Missouri and southern Iowa. Racing through Chicago towards the evening hours, the storms continued to gather strength, and began spawning tornadoes at roughly 9:00 pm EDT, north of Jackson, Michigan, and near Ann Arbor, Michigan. One tornado was confirmed by the National Weather Service to have struck the town of Saline, Michigan, as well as passing just north of nearby Milan, before travelling parallel to, and just south of, Interstate 94, where the tornado had passed over Detroit Wayne County Metropolitan Airport without damage. The tornado ultimately faded out near Taylor about 20 minutes after forming.

Several other tornadoes had formed during this period, near Adrian, tracking south of Tecumseh, through Britton, and just north of Dundee, Michigan, with a waterspout being reported at Lake Erie Metropark near Rockwood, Michigan, and dissipating after spawning an F0 just north of Amherstburg, Ontario on the other side (though still prompting a Tornado Warning for Windsor and Essex County). One final tornado was reported near Temperance, tracking towards the east, last seen near Luna Pier. Damage in the nearby Toledo, Ohio, area was also storm-caused, with the historic 126-year-old town hall (built in 1884) and fire department in Edgarton being severely damaged from high winds and an EF1 tornado, with many trees in the area down. After roughly 11:35 pm EDT, the storms had faded in strength somewhat as they tracked off to the east over Lake Erie, between Erie, Pennsylvania, and St. Thomas, Ontario.

Farther south, damaging tornadoes were also reported near Goshen, Indiana, embedded in an intense hybrid derecho. An EF1 tornado has been confirmed ahead of straight-lined wind damage in Matteson and Park Forest, Illinois, in suburban Chicago. The wind damage sent out tornado warnings in the Chicago area.

The next day, more severe weather developed in the Northeast. Most of the damage was due to winds, but a possible tornado slammed into downtown Bridgeport, Connecticut, collapsing a building and damaging others, and knocking down many trees. Much of the damaging was due to straight line winds, but a brief EF1 tornado touched down in the downtown core.

=== June 25–26 ===
EFU	EF0	EF1	EF2	EF3	EF4	EF5
0	22	7	4	0	1	0

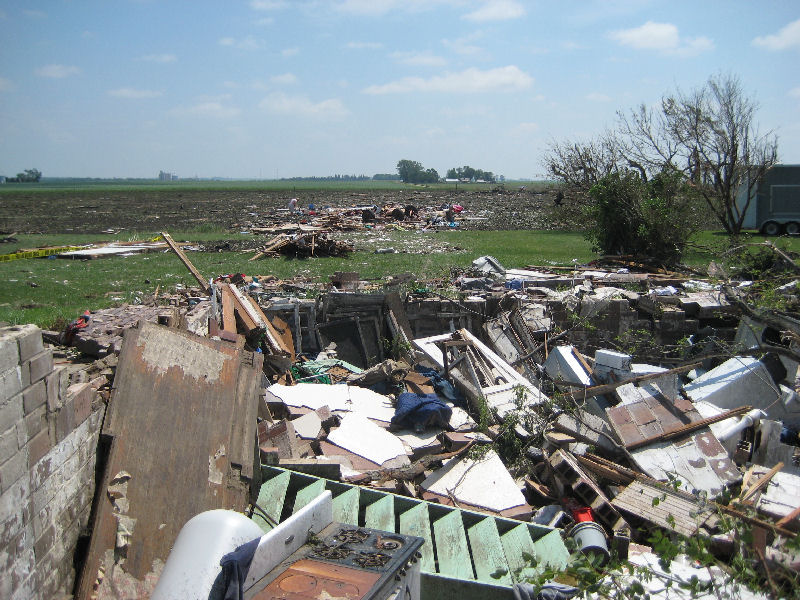
A farmhouse destroyed at EF4 intensity west of Sibley, Iowa.

The pattern of strong storms continued into June 25 and 26 with a new storm system. The strongest was a violent EF4 tornado touched that flattened several houses and farm buildings as it remained in the rural countryside near Sibley, and Little Rock, Iowa. Other tornadoes were reported on both days, including four EF2 tornadoes in southern Minnesota that did significant damage.

=== June 27 ===
EFU	EF0	EF1	EF2	EF3	EF4	EF5
0	3	6	0	0	0	0

A warm front with a weak line of thunderstorms moved through the central Great Lakes in the early afternoon of Sunday, June 27, firing up quickly, spawning several funnel clouds, and at least two touchdowns in Washtenaw and Wayne Counties in Michigan, and in neighbouring Essex County, Ontario tracking through rural farmland near Cottam, Ontario, and past Windfall, Ontario, before lifting near Quinn, Ontario. Light damage was reported across the Metro Detroit area from Taylor, Ann Arbor, north to Novi, mostly with downed trees and powerlines, along with minor structural damage. There was also an EF0 tornado that formed near Erie, Pennsylvania, in Presque Isle State Park at 7:36 pm EST. Its path was 50 to 75 yards (46 to 69 m) wide and damage was focused to about 50 trees in the storm's path that were knocked down.

Conneaut, Ohio from 6:54 until 6:59 pm, an EF1 tornado traveled 2.3 miles and had a max width of 100 yards. It touched down near Lake Road and Point Drive in Conneaut. From where it traveled East along lake road lifting up near the intersection of Broad and Russel Street. Main Damage was downed trees and limbs with some roof damage. With one Garage roof being torn off completely. In St. Clair County, one person was killed and four others were injured in a campground when a confirmed EF1 tornado tossed several trailers into a lake. A tornado also touched down in West Michigan. An EF0 tornado was confirmed to have hit Gobles in Van Buren County early in the afternoon.

=== June 30 – July 2 (Hurricane Alex) ===
EFU	EF0	EF1	EF2	EF3	EF4	EF5
0	9	1	0	0	0	0

Moisture and bands associated with Hurricane Alex and its remnants spun off several tornadoes in South Texas starting on June 30. The most significant damage took place in Hebbronville, Texas, on July 2 where several businesses and mobile homes were heavily damaged. Other tornadoes, all weak, were reported in the region.

== July ==
There were 174 tornadoes reported in the US in July, of which 129 were confirmed.

=== July 2 ===
An F3 tornado hit the Kawacatoose First Nations reserve 120 km (75 mi) north of Regina, Saskatchewan, in Canada at approximately 5 pm CDT, destroying at least 13 houses. A state of emergency was declared for the reserve, and it was the strongest tornado in Canada since the 2007 Elie, Manitoba, tornado. Over the following days, the system affected much of Saskatchewan causing severe flooding, including mass evacuations in nearby Yorkton, Saskatchewan.

=== July 14 ===
EFU	EF0	EF1	EF2	EF3	EF4	EF5
0	5	3	2	0	0	0

A hot, extremely humid and highly unstable air mass, with dewpoints exceeding 80 °F (27 °C) in many areas, combined with a cold front across portions of the Upper Midwest. A moderate risk of severe weather was issued for the region, as tornadoes began to develop in Minnesota on the afternoon of July 14. Several tornadoes were reported across the region, along with widespread moderate wind damage. The strongest tornado was rated EF2.

=== July 15–16 (Philippines) ===
As Tropical Storm Conson trekked through the Philippines, its outer bands spawned a tornado in Koronadal City, destroying 13 homes and flattening agricultural land.

On July 16, another tornado struck the country, touching down in South Cotabato province. The tornado was responsible for at least 3 million pesos (US$65,000) of agricultural and property losses.

=== July 21–24 ===
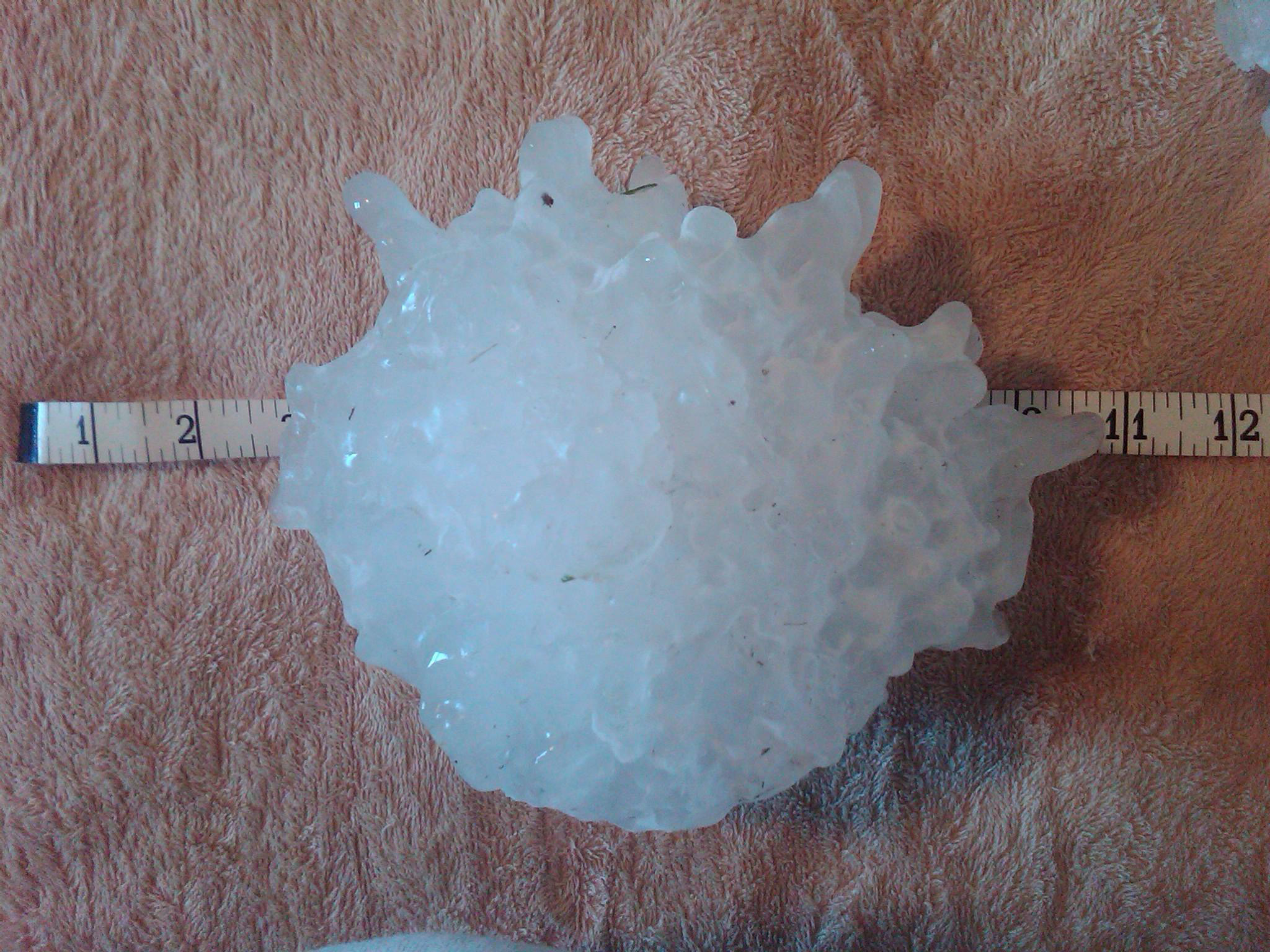
Record hailstone near Vivian, South Dakota

EFU	EF0	EF1	EF2	EF3	EF4	EF5
0	10	14	4	0	0	0

Several stalled fronts across a large swath from the Upper Midwest to New England resulted in an active stretch of weather. In addition to extensive wind damage, numerous tornadoes were reported on both days. The strongest on July 21 were rated EF1. More tornadoes touched down on July 22, with the greatest concentration in southern Wisconsin. An EF2 tornado was reported in Waukesha County, Wisconsin, with significant damage. There were three confirmed EF1 tornadoes which affected southern Maine. The towns of Alfred, Limerick, Buxton, and Gorham experienced heavy tree damage and some structural collapses. No injuries were reported. The tornadoes ranged from 200 to 250 yds in width. The Buxton/Gorham tornado traveled around 5 miles, collapsing a barn and killing two cows, before dissipating. On July 22 tornadoes two tornadoes touched down in Calhoun County, Michigan, both by Battle Creek. Tornado sirens were sounded across the county, and damage included the roof torn off of a mobile home. These storms triggered tornado warning across the southern portions of the state was they moved west. A tornado watch was put in effect for the rest of the evening in southern Michigan, and a tornado warning was issued in the early hours of July 23 for southeast Calhoun County and southwest Jackson County.

Over the following days, more tornadoes touched down, including two EF2 tornadoes in western New York and another EF2 tornado in Honesdale, Pennsylvania. Several people were injured by those tornadoes. In addition, on July 23, the largest hailstone ever recorded in the US fell in Vivian, South Dakota, alongside a weak tornado. The hailstone measured 8 inches (20 cm) in diameter.

=== July 23 (Veneto) ===
EFU	EF0	EF1	EF2	EF3	EF4	EF5
0	0	3	0	0	0	0

3 different tornadoes hit Veneto (North-East Italy) during an outbreak, while several thunderstorms hit as well the region and nearby Friuli. The tornadoes hit near Venice, Padua and Vicenza, while a man was killed by a downburst near Verona.

=== July 25 ===
An EF1 tornado touched down in The Bronx around 2:50 pm EDT, the first tornado to touch down in New York City since August 8, 2007, and the first in The Bronx since 1974. There were unconfirmed reports of at least two tornadoes, reported in Sussex, Bergen, Essex and Union counties in northern New Jersey. Also unconfirmed, tornadoes were reported in Gloucester, Salem, Cumberland, Cape May, Atlantic and Burlington counties in southern portions of New Jersey.

=== July 26 ===
EFU	EF0	EF1	EF2	EF3	EF4	EF5
0	5	5	1	1	0	0

A series of supercells developed on July 26 across the northern Rockies into the Canadian Prairies. An EF3 tornado killed two people near Reserve, Montana, as a ranch was destroyed. The same tornado also injured an elderly woman. This tornado is tied with another tornado on June 10, 1923, in Rivulet for the deadliest tornado in the state. Separately, another tornado hit the northern sections of Nashville, Tennessee, damaging over a dozen homes and other structures.

=== July 27 (Poland) ===
In Poland an F2 tornado hit Wola Rębkowska where 32 homes were damaged. The second F2 tornado hit by Annosław and damaged 6 houses

== August ==
There were 70 tornadoes reported in the US in August, of which 55 were confirmed.

In addition to the events listed below, there were two tornadoes in the Philippines, one on August 10 and the other on August 19. Collectively, the two storms injured three people and destroyed 18 homes.

=== August 1 (Australia) ===
A tornado ripped through the town of Penola in far southern South Australia. It caused severe damage in the town, destroying four buildings and rendering many others unusable. With a damage bill of almost 3 million Australian dollars, it was one of the most damaging tornadoes recorded in Australia.

=== August 7 ===
EFU	EF0	EF1	EF2	EF3	EF4	EF5
2	6	4	0	0	1	0

A series of mainly weak tornadoes occurred in the Minnesota-Wisconsin region on August 7. These tornadoes were spawned by a large, positively tilted trough located in Québec with dew points reaching into the mid-70s in southeast North Dakota and western Minnesota. The first tornado that hit the region that day was a tornado that touched down south-southwest of Tyler, North Dakota. As the tornado moved east-northeast, it crossed SE 89th Street and started to carve deep scour marks into the earth. Soon after, the tornado struck a farmstead at EF3 intensity along SE 183rd Avenue located just west of the North Dakota and Minnesota border. A home and a shelter-belt of trees were severely damaged at the farmstead. Another shelter-belt of trees were debarked as it crossed into Minnesota.

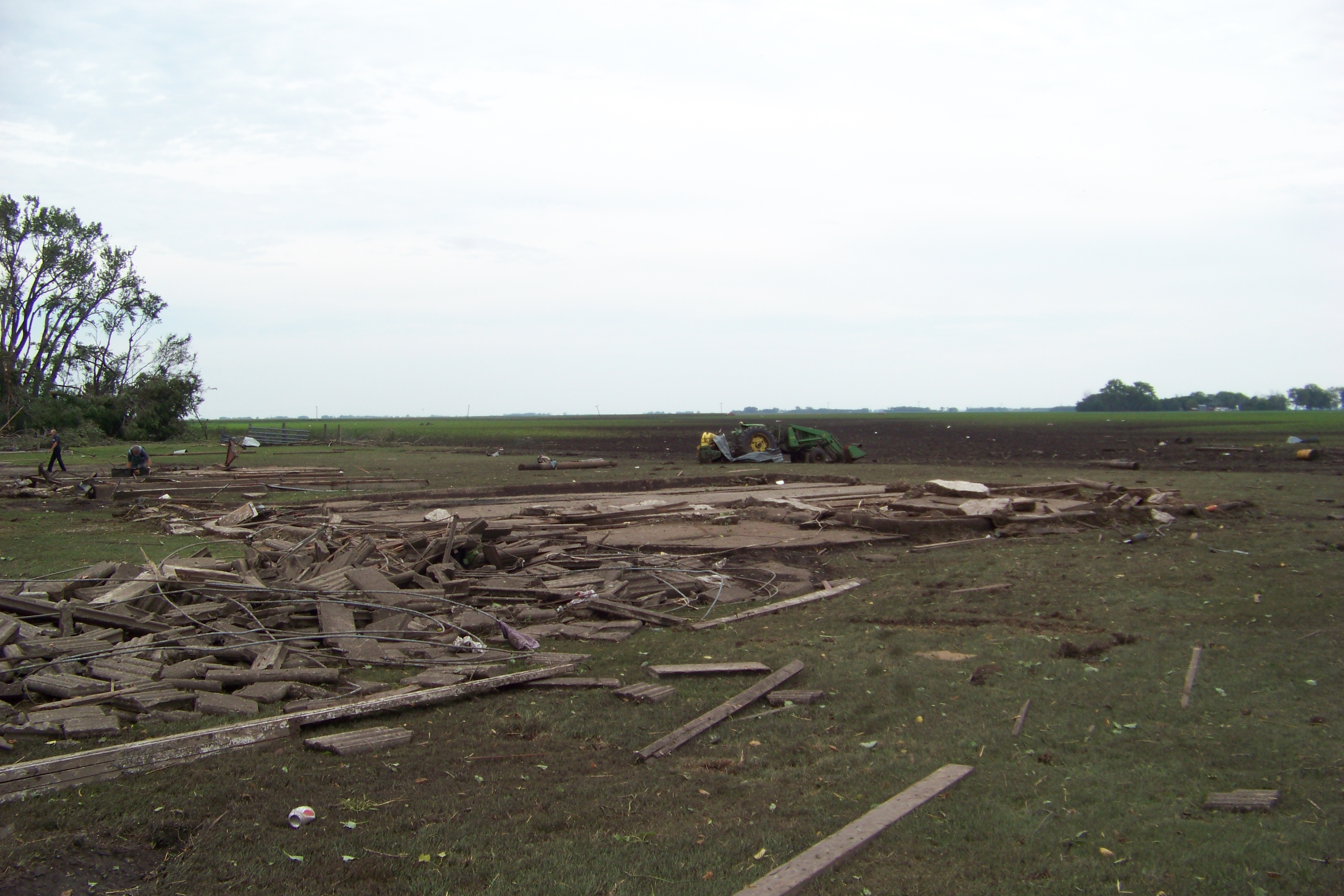
Low-end EF4 damage southwest of Doran, Minnesota

As the tornado crossed into Minnesota, the tornado still maintained a "drillbit" formation and continued to carve apparent scour marks into the earth. Soon after moving into Minnesota, the tornado then crossed County Highway 9 where it erratically tracked in between two farmsteads. The southeast corner of one of the farmsteads sustained a direct hit at low-end EF4 intensity, completely sweeping away seven well-built farm buildings and severely damaging a home. Major tree damage was noted to the shelter-belt surrounding the farmstead. A Ford pick-up truck was thrown half a mile with its engine block ripped out of the frame. Very heavy scouring was noted to a sugar-beet field in this area, with beets being yanked out of the ground. Peak wind speeds in this area were estimated to be 175 mph (282 km/h). The tornado continued for about a mile and soon dissipated southwest of Doran. Aside from this violent tornado, a few other weaker tornadoes occurred near Fergus Falls and Campbell. Evansville nearly sustained a direct hit from an EF1 tornado and another EF1 tornado occurred near Parkers Prairie. In total, 13 tornadoes touched down and there was only one injury.

=== August 12 ===
EFU	EF0	EF1	EF2	EF3	EF4	EF5
0	12	3	0	1	0	0

Another round of severe weather took place on August 12 in the northern Plains. The most intense tornado took place near Bowbells, North Dakota, which was an EF3. One person was killed and one was injured when a vehicle was thrown and destroyed.

=== August 22–24 (Europe) ===
FU	F0	F1	F2	F3	F4	F5
0	7	2	2	1	0	0

A tornado outbreak struck the coast of the Baltic Sea in Mecklenburg Western Pomerania (Northeastern Germany) and parts of the middle Western state Hesse. At least five tornadoes have been confirmed. Two of them were strong: one in Neppermin on the Island of Usedom (F2) and another one in the Hessean village of Lumda near Grünberg (F3).

== September ==
There were 61 tornadoes reported in the US in September, of which 57 were confirmed.

=== September 4 (Australia) ===
A tornado was reported just east of Broadford in Victoria. The tornado had a damage path around 100 metres (110 yd) wide and 4 kilometres (2.5 mi) long, with numerous trees damaged and damage to a home's roof.

=== September 5 (DRC) ===
A rare violent tornado in Kasaï-Occidental and Kasaï-Oriental provinces along the Kasaï river ravaged 4 villages with strong winds, hail, and heavy rain. About 100 homes were completely destroyed, as were several medical facilities, schools, and factories, with many more damaged. Several cassava fields were ruined by wind and flooding, causing food shortages. About 200 families were left homeless and many were left jobless.

=== September 7–8 (Tropical Storm Hermine) ===
EFU	EF0	EF1	EF2	EF3	EF4	EF5
0	10	2	1	0	0	0

A few tornadoes were reported across parts of Texas and in southern Oklahoma on September 7–8 as a result of Tropical Storm Hermine and its remnants. Most of them were weak, but one EF2 tornado touched down in Dallas on the afternoon of September 8, heavily damaging at least one building near downtown.

=== September 14–15 ===
EFU	EF0	EF1	EF2	EF3	EF4	EF5
0	13	0	0	0	0	0

Tornadoes were reported in northwest Kansas on September 14, causing minimal damage. On September 15, several tornadoes were reported in south central Kansas, again causing minimal damage. However, the tornadoes across south central Kansas were also accompanied by hail up to 7.75 inches (19.7 cm) in diameter (larger than grapefruit size), which caused widespread damage. The hailstone measuring 7.75 inches (19.7 cm) in diameter, 15.5 inches (39 cm) in circumference, and weighing 1.1 pounds (0.50 kg) set a new record for the largest hailstone by diameter in the state of Kansas, breaking the old record of 5.7 inches (14 cm) set by a hailstone in Coffeyville, Kansas, on September 3, 1970.

=== September 16 ===
EFU	EF0	EF1	EF2	EF3	EF4	EF5
0	2	8	3	1	0	0

Two tornadoes touched down in New York City and brought torrential downpours and heavy wind gusts as they struck parts of Queens and Brooklyn. One tornado touched down in Park Slope and remained on the ground for 2 miles. The other touched down in Flushing Meadows Corona Park and remained on the ground for four miles dissipating near Bayside, Queens. There were reports of downed trees and power lines along with roofs torn off of buildings. One tornado blew down the spire of a 300-year-old church on Main Street in Flushing. The Brooklyn tornado was rated an EF0 and the Queens tornado was rated an EF1. One person is known to have been killed as a result of the storm.

In addition, one person was confirmed dead in Belleville, Wood County, West Virginia, by an EF3 tornado where many structures where heavily damaged or destroyed, including camping trailers. Other tornadoes, including several rated EF2, were also confirmed in southeastern Ohio as a result of a supercell that developed that afternoon. In addition, there had been a reported tornado that went through southern Wooster, OH, in which destroyed parts of the Ohio State Campus branch. National Weather Service rated it as an EF2.

=== September 29 (Jamaica) ===
The island of Jamaica was affected by Tropical Storm Nicole. In Savanna-la-Mar, Westmoreland, the storm spawned a very rare tornado accompanied by heavy rains. Although short lived, two homes were destroyed and 12 others were damaged by the tornado, recording a very unlikely occurrence of a tornado in the Caribbean, particularly in Jamaica.

== October ==
There were 122 tornadoes reported in the US in October, of which 108 were confirmed.

=== October 6 ===
EFU	EF0	EF1	EF2	EF3	EF4	EF5
0	4	2	4	2	0	0

An unusually active severe weather event developed across the Four Corners states. On October 5, a cluster of severe thunderstorms struck Maricopa County, Arizona, particularly the Phoenix metropolitan area, producing very large, destructive hail up to 3 inches (7.6 cm) in diameter across the region. The hail destroyed roofs and vehicles, shattered windows, and, in Scottsdale, damaged dozens of aircraft at the Scottsdale Airport. One particularly damaging hailstorm in Glendale destroyed roofs and vehicles, and punctured thirty-four skylights at the St. Mary's Food Bank in Phoenix, resulting in heavy rainfall entering the structure and ruining approximately 20 percent of the food inventory. One person was injured by large hail on a football practice field in the area as well. The storms weakened and dissipated that night, but another severe weather event was expected in Arizona beginning early the next day. Large hail and damaging winds were expected to be the primary hazards, although an isolated tornado threat was also noted. However, environmental conditions were more favorable for the development of tornadic supercells than expected. As a result, a round of supercells formed and produced a tornado outbreak that struck northern Arizona and southern Utah, an extremely rare occurrence for an area west of the Rocky Mountains. The most significant damage was in Bellemont, Arizona, which was struck by three tornadoes in short succession. The first and third one were rated EF2 while the second one was rated EF3. Throughout the town, houses and businesses were significantly damaged, a train was derailed and Camp Navajo was heavily damaged. The first EF2 tornado also caused all seven of the tornadic injuries that occurred during the outbreak. Other tornadoes touched down, but primarily remained over the open mountainous terrain in the very sparsely populated area. However, one other EF3 tornado touched down on the Navajo Nation and destroyed three metal transmission towers, one of which was flattened. Although the exact track length of this tornado is unknown given that it passed over a very rural area, it and the other EF3 tornado that day were among the strongest tornadoes ever recorded west of the Rockies.

=== October 21 (Argentina) ===
A tornado touched down in Formosa Province, Argentina and struck the town of Pozo del Tigre, killing six people and injuring 116. An estimated 70% to 80% of the town lost power.

=== October 24–27 ===
EFU	EF0	EF1	EF2	EF3	EF4	EF5
0	49	30	8	0	0	0

Radar loop of the Rice, Texas thunderstorm. The thunderstorm which produced the Rice, Texas tornado is the first thunderstorm in the loop.

A developing intense low pressure system resulted in an unstable air mass over parts of the Southern United States on October 24. The most intense tornado hit Rice, Texas, where a high school was heavily damaged and several people were reported to be injured. That tornado was rated as an EF2. Another notable tornado, an EF1, hit Mobile, Alabama, early on October 25.

As the low explosively deepened to become the most intense extratropical low of non-tropical origins ever recorded in the continental United States, reaching as low as 955 mbar (28.20 inHg) over northern Minnesota (as low as a medium-sized Category 3 hurricane), storms developed on the associated cold front late on October 25. A high risk of severe storms, the first to be issued in October since October 24, 2001, and the first in any fall month since November 15, 2005, was issued for parts of the Midwest including most of Indiana early on October 26, with both a tornado outbreak ahead of the front and a major serial derecho expected from the Gulf Coast to the upper Great Lakes. The high risk was later extended northward in the mid morning. That morning, a few tornadoes struck, primarily around Lake Michigan, including a confirmed EF2 tornado four miles east of Peotone, Illinois, and another EF2 in Cridersville, Ohio, with more tornadoes reported near the Ohio River. Almost every county in southern Michigan was placed under a tornado warning as the storm tracked eastward. Later that day, a confirmed EF1 tornado struck Middlesboro, Kentucky. In addition, widespread intense wind damage was also reported from Mississippi northward to Michigan.

The cold front tracked eastward on October 27 as the storm weakened. Additional tornadoes developed across the Mid-Atlantic states as the atmosphere remained unstable. In the end, with 87 tornadoes confirmed, it was the largest October tornado outbreak ever recorded, even though none of the tornadoes were stronger than EF2 and there were no fatalities.

== November ==
There were 63 tornadoes reported in the US in November, of which 53 were confirmed.

=== November 22–23 ===
EFU	EF0	EF1	EF2	EF3	EF4	EF5
0	1	4	1	0	0	0

On November 22, an unusually warm air mass moved over the Midwest bringing the threat of severe weather to the region. At 11:35 am, a tornado watch was issued for eastern Iowa, and extending into central Illinois and northeastern Missouri. At 3:04 pm, a tornado touched down just east of Rockford, Illinois. This tornado produced major damage in the area. On November 23, the National Weather Service in Chicago went to survey the damage, and estimated that the tornado was 200 yards wide, and traveled 16.4 miles. The tornado was rated EF2, with estimated winds in excess of 135 mph. Other tornadoes reported included two that struck Union Grove and Walworth County, Wisconsin, both rated EF1. As the storms moved east into Indiana and Michigan, tornado watches were put out, but no tornado or severe thunderstorm warnings were issued. On November 24, The National Weather Service in Chicago surveyed damage in extreme northern McHenry County in Illinois. It was determined that an EF0 tornado struck there. An EF-1 tornado touched down in El Dorado County, California, on November 22 damaging a commercial structure, power lines, and trees.

=== November 29–30 ===
EFU	EF0	EF1	EF2	EF3	EF4	EF5
1	14	9	6	1	1	0

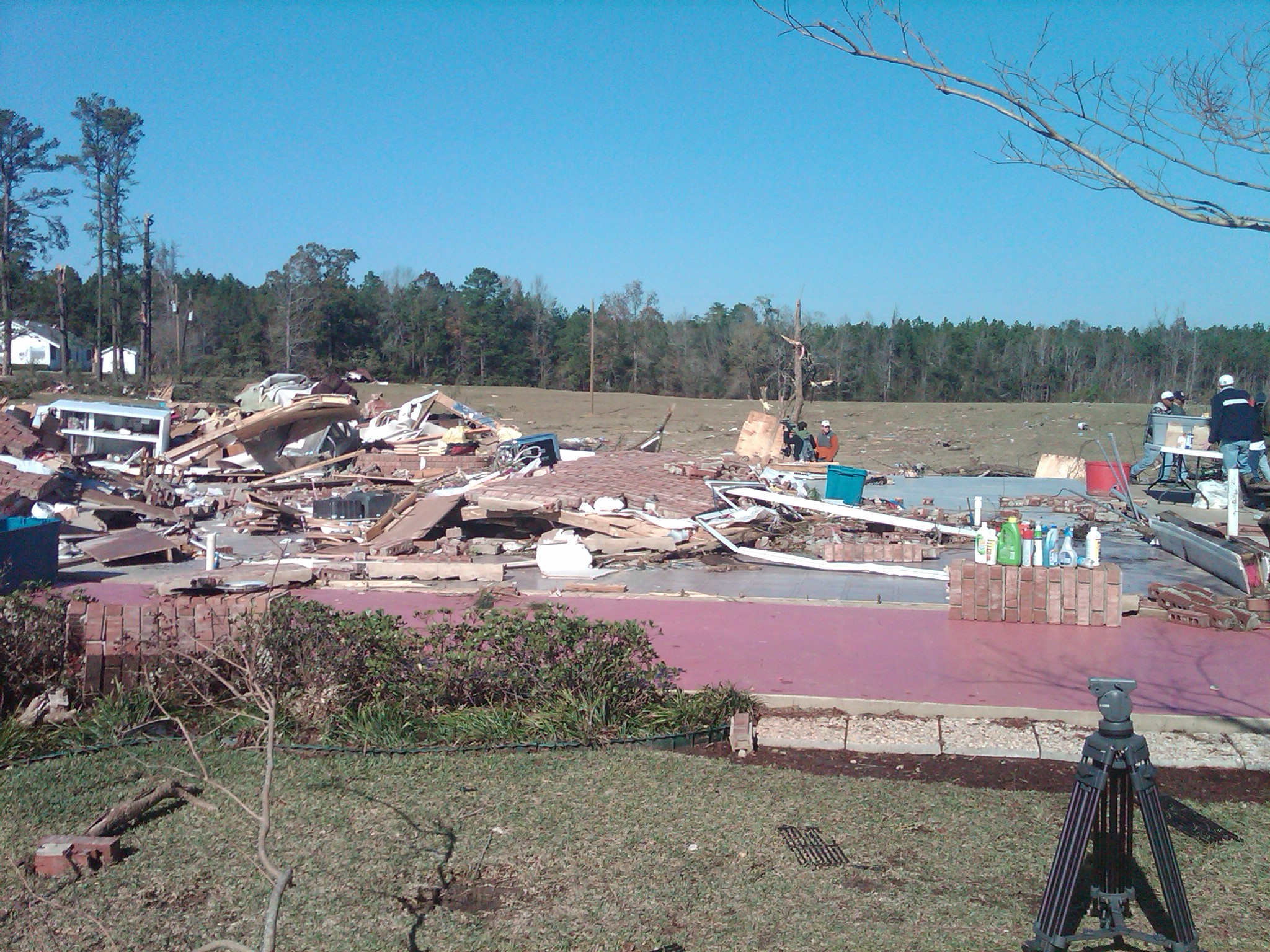
Low-end EF4 damage west of Atlanta, Louisiana

An intense storm system impacted the Deep South on November 29. A few supercells developed in the warm sector, with some producing tornadoes. The first significant tornado of the outbreak was a low-end EF4 tornado that touched down west-southwest of Atlanta, Louisiana. Soon after touchdown, the tornado crossed Gum Springs Rd where it intensified to low-end EF4 strength, sweeping away a large two-story mansion off its foundation. Peak wind speeds at this location were estimated to be 170 mph (270 km/h). As it continued northeast, it weakened producing mainly EF0 damage before lifting north-northwest of Winnfield. Surprisingly, nobody was injured by this tornado. A few hours later, a strong EF2 tornado touched down southwest of Yazoo City, Mississippi, significantly damaging trees and homes. Another strong tornado touched down in downtown Yazoo City being rated a low-end EF2 with peak wind speeds of 115 mph (185 km/h).

Southwest of Kosciusko, Mississippi, an intense EF3 tornado touched down destroying numerous mobile homes. Six injuries were associated with this tornado. Soon after that, another significant tornado touched down and moved through downtown Starkville being rated EF2. Many homes sustained significant damage and fifteen people were injured. Another EF2 tornado briefly touched down northeast of Aberdeen, Mississippi, damaging trees and homes. A tornado passed near Raleigh damaging trees and homes as well. The last significant tornado of the outbreak northeast of Lawrenceville, Georgia, on November 30, significantly damaging trees and homes. In total, 32 tornadoes touched down overall with a total of 32 injuries. Two non-tornadic fatalities occurred as a result of the severe weather: in both cases, a tree fell on a vehicle, with one instance being in West Milford, New Jersey and the other in Gwinnett County, Georgia.

== December ==
There were 48 tornadoes reported in the US in December, of which 32 were confirmed.

=== December 7 (Portugal) ===
A tornado struck Tomar, Portugal on December 7 injuring 40 people, 19 of them children at a kindergarten. The tornado was caught on amateur video by a local. The tornado was rated F3 and left 18 million euros in damage.

=== December 14 ===
Around noon on December 14, severe weather moved into west-central Oregon off the Pacific Ocean. An EF2 tornado in the town of Aumsville, Oregon, causing significant damage and two injuries in the community. Several houses and businesses were nearly destroyed as well as a result. Strong tornadoes are rare west of the Rocky Mountains, and especially in the Pacific Northwest.

=== December 30–31 ===
EFU	EF0	EF1	EF2	EF3	EF4	EF5
0	9	10	4	5	0	0

After a long lull in activity, a series of intense storms and associated cold fronts tracked across the Midwest starting late on December 30, with most of the activity on December 31. Early that morning, an EF3 tornado touched down in Washington County, Arkansas, destroying houses and killing at least four people. In nearby Benton County, Arkansas, another tornado caused significant damage and injuries.

More damaging tornadoes touched down late that morning across much of Missouri and into west-central Illinois. In Rolla, Missouri, at least four people were killed and several others were injured. It is the deadliest December tornado outbreak in the US since December 16, 2000 and they were the first killer US tornadoes since September 16. Numerous tornadoes also touched down in the St. Louis metropolitan area which were embedded in a squall line, including reports in the city of St. Louis itself. The most significant damage was in Sunset Hills and injuries were reported there.

Another round of storms developed in the Deep South that afternoon. The worst storms developed in Mississippi and a tornado emergency was issued late that afternoon in the Jackson, Mississippi, area. That activity continued into the early hours of January 1 (see Tornadoes of 2011). This event may have been a precursor for the year to come, as 2011 would end up being the most devastating year in tornadoes since 1925 in the U.S.

== See also ==
- Weather of 2010
- Tornado
  - Tornadoes by year
  - Tornado records
  - Tornado climatology
  - Tornado myths
- List of tornado outbreaks
  - List of F5 and EF5 tornadoes
  - List of F4 and EF4 tornadoes
    - List of F4 and EF4 tornadoes (2010–2019)
  - List of North American tornadoes and tornado outbreaks
  - List of 21st-century Canadian tornadoes and tornado outbreaks
  - List of European tornadoes and tornado outbreaks
  - List of tornadoes and tornado outbreaks in Asia
  - List of Southern Hemisphere tornadoes and tornado outbreaks
  - List of tornadoes striking downtown areas
  - List of tornadoes with confirmed satellite tornadoes
- Tornado intensity
  - Fujita scale
  - Enhanced Fujita scale
  - International Fujita scale
  - TORRO scale
