= Tornado outbreak of June 5–6, 2010 =

Tornado outbreak in the Midwestern US and the Great Lakes

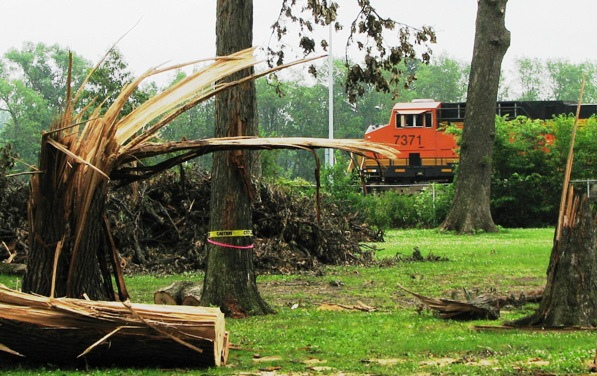
- Multiple downed trees near Streator, Illinois.

Meteorological history
- Duration: June 5–6, 2010

Tornado outbreak
- Tornadoes: 53 confirmed
- Max. rating: EF4 tornado

Overall effects
- Casualties: 8 fatalities (+ 1 non-tornadic), 68 injuries
- Damage: >$266 million
- Part of the tornado outbreaks of 2010

A major tornado outbreak sequence took place between June 5-6, 2010 affecting the Midwestern United States and parts of the Great Lakes region, starting the weekend of June 5, 2010, and extending into the morning of June 6, 2010. At least 53 tornadoes were confirmed from Iowa to southern Ontario and Ohio as well as in northern New England. Seven people were confirmed dead in Ohio just outside Toledo in Wood County, and one in Dwight, Illinois. Damage from the tornadoes in the United States totaled over $266 million.

== Meteorological synopsis ==
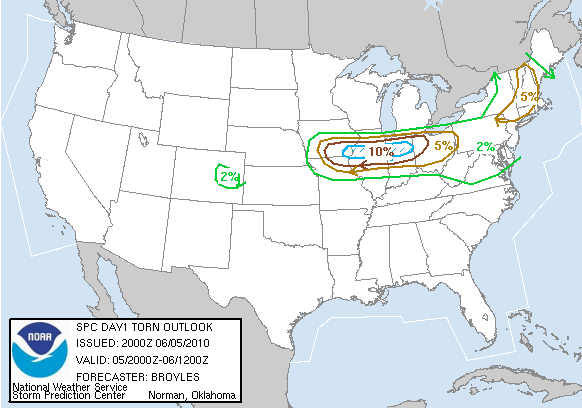
Preliminary tornado probability outlook from Storm Prediction Center, issued on June 5, 2010

A low pressure system moved across the central United States on June 5 where a moderate risk for severe thunderstorms was issued for areas along Interstate 80 from the Quad Cities area to near Cleveland, Ohio and Pittsburgh, Pennsylvania. Strong storms developed early in the afternoon across most of the area covered under the moderate risk and into central Iowa. Tornadoes were reported near Interstate 35 as well as in parts of central Ohio.

Severe weather shifted into Illinois during the early evening hours as the daytime heating and instability peaked. Tornadoes were reported in the Peoria, Illinois area as well as in areas just west of Chicago during the early evening hours. Heavy damage was reported in LaSalle County, Illinois as well as in Livingston County, Illinois. A tornado emergency was issued in the Peoria area after multiple sightings just outside the city. Heavy damage was reported in the Elmwood and Yates City area. In Streator, an EF2 tornado damaged 180 homes, destroyed 20 homes and injured 17 people. Two other tornadoes (rated EF0 and EF3) touched down just outside Streator as well, causing additional damage to homes and power lines. In Dwight a second EF2 tornado struck a mobile home park, destroying 12 homes and leaving several others uninhabitable. Other buildings were damaged in town and several well-built homes lost their roofs. Two separate EF0 tornadoes touched down in Dwight as well, causing damage to roofs, trees, and derailing a train. Six people were injured from the tornado, one of whom died from his injuries at the end of the month.

After midnight, storms moved into northern Indiana, northern Ohio, southern Michigan and southwestern Ontario where heavy damage was reported just outside Toledo in Wood County where seven people were killed. In Allen Township, eight homes were destroyed, three received major damage and 10 received minor damage. Heavy damage was also reported in Leamington, Ontario where a state of emergency was declared. In Michigan, shortly after midnight, Calhoun, Kalamazoo, Hillsdale, Jackson, Ingham, Branch, Berrien, Van Buren, Saint Joseph, Washtenaw, Wayne, and Monroe counties were all under simultaneous tornado warnings, including two separate simultaneous warnings covering all of Calhoun County. Damage in Calhoun County included downed trees and a metal flagpole bent at a right angle in Homer, Michigan due to extreme winds. The decision to sound tornado sirens was made in many communities. An EF1 tornado was confirmed just south of Battle Creek by the NWS; damage included a roof being torn off of a church. An EF2 tornado damaged a total of 311 houses, apartments and commercial and public buildings in Monroe County.

A moderate risk was issued for June 6 across the northeast coast of the United States primarily due to damaging wind, with tornadoes also a significant threat. However, it busted for the most part, with only scattered wind damage and no tornadoes.

== Confirmed tornadoes ==
- Note: 5 tornadoes in Ontario are using the older Fujita scale

Confirmed tornadoes by Enhanced Fujita rating
EFU	EF0	EF1	EF2	EF3	EF4	EF5	Total
0	18	20	11	3	1	0	53

=== June 5 event ===
List of reported tornadoes – Saturday, June 5, 2010
EF#	Location	County	Coord.	Time (UTC)	Path length	Comments/Damage
Ohio
EF0	NE of Lucas	Richland	40.74°N 82.44°W	1746	0.4 miles (640 m)	A barn was destroyed and there was porch damage to a house. Four cattle were injured by flying sheet metal.
EF1	Walnut Creek area	Holmes, Tuscarawas	40.57°N 81.82°W	1850	9 miles (14 km)	About 20 structures sustained roof damage. Trees were knocked down and a trailer was flipped over.
EF2	N of Liberty Center	Fulton	41.50°N 84.01°W	0238	7.5 miles (12.1 km)	Damage to houses, branches and power lines. Several weak houses were destroyed. A bicycle was found embedded into the wall of one house.
EF1	NW of Whitehouse	Lucas	41.53°N 83.87°W	0300	4 miles (6.4 km)	Several houses sustained roof damage, and outbuildings were also damaged.
EF4	Millbury area	Wood, Ottawa	41.33°N 83.33°W	0320	9 miles (14 km)	7 deaths – See article on this tornado – At least 28 others were injured.
Vermont
EF1	SW of Craftsbury	Orleans	44.62°N 72.41°W	1830	2.5 miles (4.0 km)	Discontinuous path length with one house losing parts of its roof and many trees knocked down.
New Hampshire
EF0	Gorham	Coos	44.40°N 71.22°W	2014	0.1 miles (160 m)	Brief tornado in town. Two houses sustained minor damage and a few trees were damaged.
Ontario
F1	E of Dalkeith	Stormont, Dundas and Glengarry		2100	5 miles (8.0 km)	Extensive damage to houses, mobile homes, grain bins, barns, trees and power lines along the path. Dissipated just before the Quebec border but may have redeveloped again.
Maine
EF1	South Paris	Oxford	44.22°N 70.51°W	2119	4.25 miles (6.84 km)	Hundreds of trees and several structures were damaged.
Illinois
EF0	NE of Abingdon	Knox	40.83°N 90.36°W	0034	0.1 miles (160 m)	Brief tornado resulted in minor crop damage.
EF2	Elmwood area	Knox, Peoria	40.78°N 89.97°W	0056	7.8 miles (12.6 km)	About 30 businesses, 12 houses and many vehicles were damaged or destroyed by the tornado, particularly in downtown Elmwood. Numerous outbuildings, garages and sheds were also heavily damaged or destroyed.
EF1	Oak Hill	Peoria	40.81°N 89.88°W	0110	5.5 miles (8.9 km)	Trees and power poles were knocked down, a grain bin was blown away and sheds were destroyed. Minor damage to homes including shingles torn off and a garage door was blown in.
EF2	Magnolia area	Putnam, LaSalle	41.11°N 89.23°W	0110	9.5 miles (15.3 km)	A communications tower was destroyed and four houses were heavily damaged, along with numerous farm buildings. Widespread and extensive tree damage along the path.
EF1	S of Kickapoo	Peoria	40.74°N 89.61°W	0118	5.5 miles (8.9 km)	Many trees were knocked down, some of them landing on houses. Roof damage was reported to other houses. A few barns were damaged or destroyed.
EF0	W of Ottawa	LaSalle	41.31°N 88.90°W	0132	0.25 miles (400 m)	Brief tornado with damage to a few trees.
EF0	Orange Prairie	Peoria	40.77°N 89.67°W	0132	2 miles (3.2 km)	Several houses sustained minor damage and trees were snapped.
EF2	Streator area	Marshall, LaSalle	41.13°N 88.83°W	0134	18 miles (29 km)	Over 20 houses were destroyed and over 180 other houses were damaged, including many where roofs were blown off well-built houses. An athletic park was heavily damaged. Barns and silos were also damaged and extensive tree damage also took place. At least 17 people were injured.
EF0	W of Streator area	LaSalle	41.13°N 88.90°W	0150	0.1 miles (160 m)	Brief satellite tornado adjacent to the main Streator tornado with no damage.
EF2	N of Washington	Tazewell, Woodford	40.73°N 89.44°W	0151	3.5 miles (5.6 km)	Two houses were severely damaged and many barns and outbuildings were destroyed. Trees and power poles were also snapped.
EF3	E of Streator	LaSalle	41.13°N 88.72°W	0158	10 miles (16 km)	Tornado touched down immediately after the Streator town tornado lifted. Transmission towers were destroyed and several barns and houses were heavily damaged. Several trees were also debarked.
EF2	Dwight (1st tornado)	Livingston	41.10°N 88.58°W	0212	5.8 miles (9.3 km)	1 death – A mobile home park was severely damaged by the tornado. Some mobile homes were completely destroyed while others were severely damaged and rendered inhabitable. Numerous other houses and buildings were damaged. Seven people were injured, one of whom later died from his injuries.
EF0	Dwight (2nd tornado)	Livingston	41.10°N 88.58°W	0216	2.1 miles (3.4 km)	A train was derailed, a house sustained minor damage and some trees were damaged.
EF0	E of Dwight	Livingston	41.10°N 88.50°W	0231	3.2 miles (5.1 km)	Minor damage to tree limbs and a metal farm outbuilding.
EF1	SW of Kankakee	Kankakee	41.05°N 88.06°W	0302	0.5 miles (800 m)	A machine shed was destroyed, fencing was damaged and trees were uprooted.
EF0	NE of Fairbury	Livingston	40.80°N 88.43°W	0308	0.25 miles (400 m)	Corn was twisted in a field and a barn sustained minor damage.
EF3	St. Anne area (1st tornado)	Kankakee	41.05°N 87.72°W	0318	7.8 miles (12.6 km)	Several houses were destroyed and others were damaged. Many trees were also damaged, a few landing on houses. One person was injured.
EF1	St. Anne area (2nd tornado)	Kankakee	41.06°N 87.72°W	0319	0.2 miles (320 m)	A brief satellite tornado touched down in an open farm field and destroyed a machine shed and grain trailer.
EF0	SW of Beason	Logan, DeWitt	40.13°N 89.23°W	0357	12 miles (19 km)	Two houses were damaged, trees were also damaged and corn crops ruined.
Iowa
EF0	SW of St. Mary's	Warren	41.30°N 93.78°W	2311	1 mile (1.6 km)	Tornado reported by the VORTEX2 team near Interstate 35.
EF1	Maquoketa	Jackson	42.07°N 90.67°W	0040	2.25 miles (3.62 km)	Many mobile homes and vehicles were damaged, along with one house and several outbuildings. An elementary school was also damaged. One person was injured.
EF0	NNE of Goose Lake	Clinton	42.00°N 90.36°W	0100	0.5 miles (800 m)	Damage limited to a few tree branches snapped.
Michigan
EF2	Stevensville	Berrien	42.01°N 86.52°W	0328	3.5 miles (5.6 km)	A roof was blown off a house. Trees and power poles were also snapped.
EF1	SE of Stevensville	Berrien	41.99°N 86.41°W	0336	1.5 miles (2.4 km)	A pole barn was destroyed and trees were blown down.
EF2	SE of Dowagiac	Cass	41.97°N 86.09°W	0359	3 miles (4.8 km)	Several houses sustained damage in a housing subdivision. Severe and extensive tree damage along the path.
EF2	S of Constantine	St. Joseph	41.80°N 86.48°W	0432	11 miles (18 km)	Two cell towers were blown down and structures were damaged. Trees were damaged and twisted.
Sources: SPC Storm Reports of 06/05/10, NWS Burlington, NWS Chicago, NWS Quad Cities, NWS Northern Indiana, NWS Cleveland, NWS Central Illinois, NWS Gray, NCDC Storm Data

=== June 6 event ===
List of reported tornadoes – Sunday, June 6, 2010
EF#	Location	County	Coord.	Time (UTC)	Path length	Comments/Damage
Indiana
EF1	Yeoman area	White, Carroll	40.74°N 87.04°W	0503	4.1 miles (6.6 km)	Damage to several homes, a church and 13 barns. A boat outlet and several boats were also destroyed. Two people were injured.
EF1	Deacon	Carroll, Cass	40.65°N 86.22°W	0525	6 miles (9.7 km)	A trailer was flipped and hog barns were destroyed. One person was injured.
EF3	SW of Bunker Hill	Cass, Miami	40.64°N 86.13°W	0541	7.5 miles (12.1 km)	Three houses were heavily damaged, one of which was destroyed. Many trees were damaged by the tornado with a few debarked. Damage was also reported on Grissom Air Force Base where an anenometer reported a wind gust of 114 mph (183 km/h). One person was injured.
EF0	Muncie	Delaware	40.16°N 85.42°W	2302	unknown	Brief tornado damaged a few power poles.
Michigan
EF1	Battle Creek	Calhoun	42.29°N 85.19°W	0504	1.6 miles (2.6 km)	Tornado touched down in the area of Riverside Drive and Chapel Hill Drive. Trees were snapped off and the roof of Chapel Hill United Methodist Church was torn away.
EF1	Rome Center	Lenawee	41.95°N 84.21°W	0548	2.5 miles (4.0 km)	Several buildings were destroyed and numerous trees were knocked down.
EF2	Dundee area	Monroe	41.96°N 83.66°W	0611	13.5 miles (21.7 km)	Severe damage to numerous houses and damage was also sustained at a Cabela's store. Splash Universe water park also had roof damage. A state of emergency was declared. 11 people were injured.
EF1	Detroit Beach	Monroe	41.97°N 83.31°W	0633	5 miles (8.0 km)	Over 125 houses were damaged from the tornado and many trees were knocked down. The Enrico Fermi Nuclear Generating Station was impacted. Damage to the power plant was limited to minor siding damage, and an automatic shutdown due to loss of external power. Tornado continued into Lake Erie and may have crossed into Ontario.
Ontario
F0	SW of Harrow	Essex		0655	0.5 miles (800 m)	Brief tornado in the Crystal Lane area on Lake Erie with minor tree and structural damage. May have been the same tornado that hit Detroit Beach.
F1	S of Harrow	Essex		0700	1.2 miles (1.9 km)	Second tornado in the area with minor damage.
F2	SE of Harrow	Essex		0710	0.6 miles (0.97 km)	Third tornado in the area heavily damaged a brick house and destroyed a barn.
F1	Leamington area	Essex		0715	4.4 miles (7.1 km)	Extensive damage along a long swath with damage mostly to trees but with some property damage with tornado embedded in larger field of straight-line wind damage. State of emergency declared a few hours later. Tornado remained on the southern side of town.
Pennsylvania
EF0	Lake City	Erie	41.99°N 80.39°W	0700	6 miles (9.7 km)	Intermittent tornado touchdown with minor damage to a few buildings. Many trees were knocked down. The tornado was embedded in a larger microburst which resulted in one fatality (not related to the tornado).
EF0	ESE of Rometown	Crawford	41.72°N 79.62°W	1045	1 mile (1.6 km)	Narrow tornado resulted in minor damage to two houses.
EF0	S of Greenville	Mercer	41.32°N 80.26°W	1105	2.5 miles (4.0 km)	A few trees, houses and trailers were damaged.
Ohio
EF0	SW of Marysville	Union	40.22°N 83.42°W	0934	3.4 miles (5.5 km)	One house lost parts of its roof and several others sustained minor damage. Trees were also damaged.
EF1	Andover	Ashtabula	41.59°N 80.62°W	1001	4.5 miles (7.2 km)	Significant tree damage and a roof was taken off of a barn. A warehouse was damaged on the southeast side of town, and boats were thrown around at the Pymatuning Reservoir.
Sources: SPC Storm Reports of 06/05/10, NWS Cleveland, NWS Detroit, NWS Northern Indiana, NWS Pittsburgh, NWS Indianapolis, NWS Wilmington, OH, NWS Grand Rapids, NCDC Storm Data

=== Millbury, Ohio ===
Millbury, Ohio
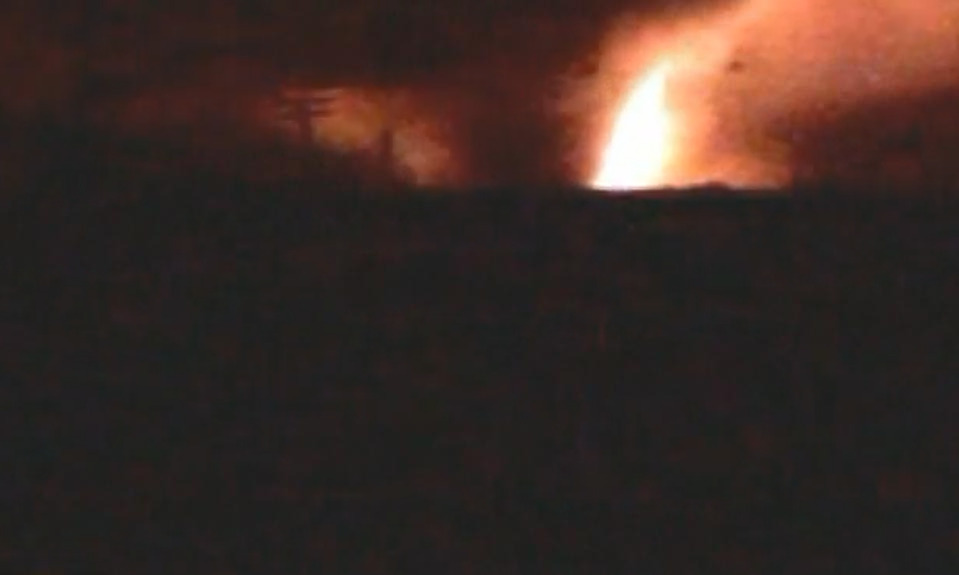
- Security camera footage of the tornado

Meteorological history
- Formed: June 5, 2010 11:20 p.m. EDT (UTC−05:00)
- Dissipated: June 5, 2010 11:34 p.m. EDT (UTC−05:00)
- Duration: 14 minutes

EF4 tornado
- on the Enhanced Fujita scale
- Highest winds: 175 mph (282 km/h)

Overall effects
- Fatalities: 7 (+1 indirect)
- Injuries: ≥28

Severe damage in the area with at least 60 houses destroyed, including a few houses swept from their foundations, and several hundred others were damaged by the tornado. Lake High School was destroyed a mere 12 hours before the graduation of the class of 2010. Lake Township's municipal building was also destroyed, along with the local police station. Cars and buses were picked up and thrown, and trees were debarked. Large airplane hangars were completely destroyed, and a train was derailed. The tornado, which was on the ground for 14 minutes along an 8.8-mile-long and 400-yard-wide path, killed seven people and injured at least 28 others. Damages were estimated at $102.4 million.

== Aftermath ==
Illinois Governor Pat Quinn declared LaSalle, Livingston, Peoria and Putnam counties disaster areas. Allegations of racial discrimination in the mainly African American communities of Pembroke Township and Hopkins Park occurred after they were not included in the state disaster area. Quinn said that Kankakee County had not made a request on the behalf of Pembroke. Many residents of Pembroke received no warning before the tornadoes moved through the area. The community had received a state grant to purchase a tornado siren, but the money had never been allocated, leaving the town of 2,784 residents without any warning system. After it was revealed the area had no working siren, state lawmakers Lisa Dugan and Toi Hutchinson promised every home in the area would be supplied with a weather radio, and funding would be raised for a tornado siren. The Federal Emergency Management Agency (FEMA) rejected federal disaster aid for victims in Elmwood, Illinois.

== See also ==
- List of North American tornadoes and tornado outbreaks
- Tornado outbreak and derecho of June 9–11, 2026
