= 2010 Millbury tornado =

EF4 tornado in Ohio

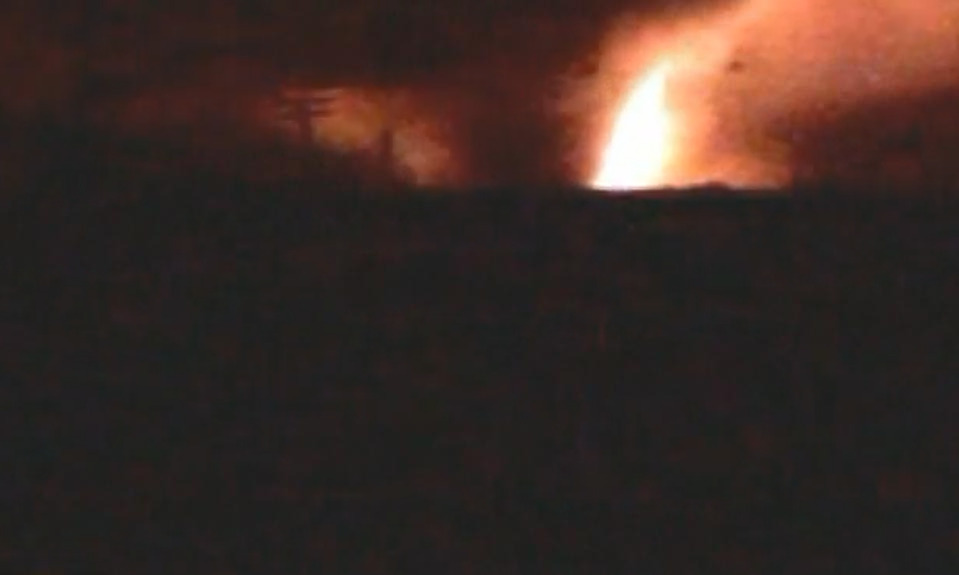
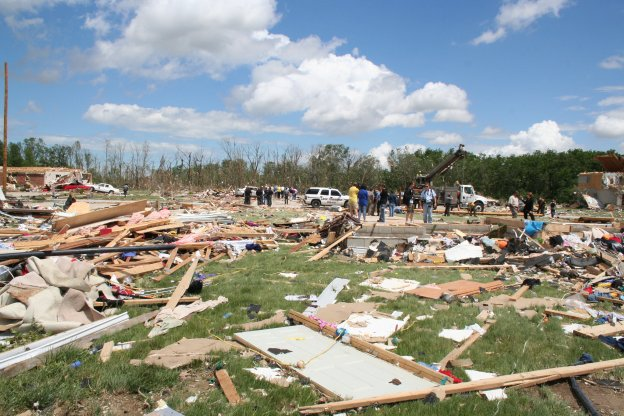
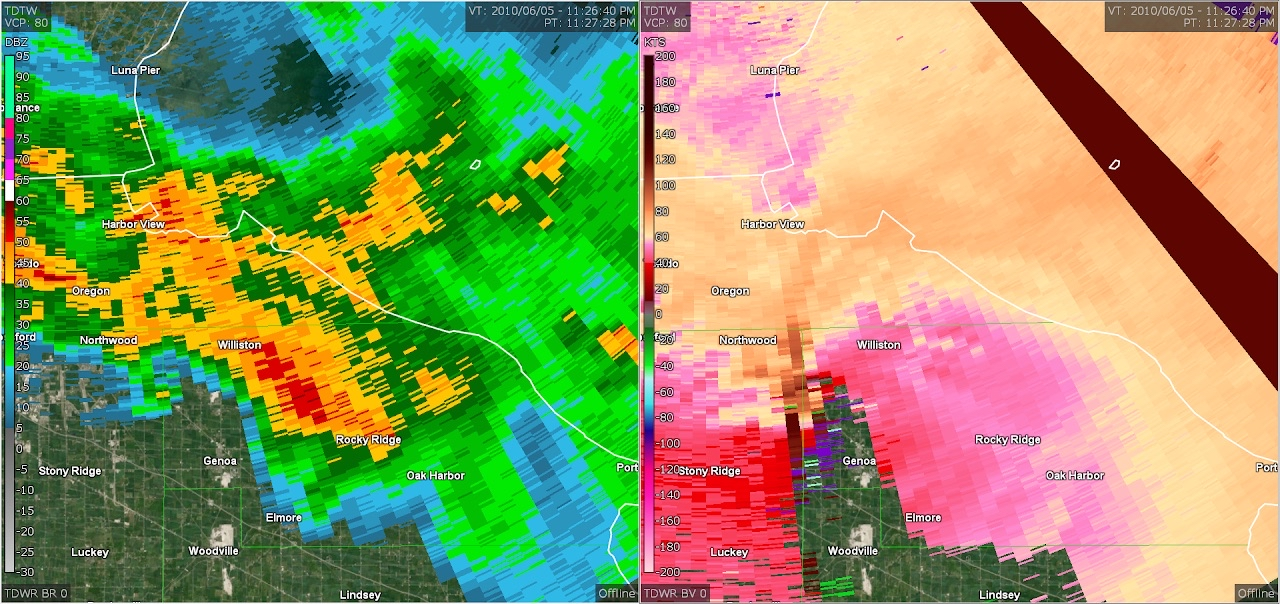
- Clockwise from top: Security camera footage of the tornado; NEXRAD radar imagery of the tornado as it entered Ottawa County. The hook echo, indicating the location of the tornado, can be seen southeast of Northwood; EF4 level damage in the northern areas of Millbury.

Meteorological history
- Formed: June 5, 2010 11:20 p.m. EDT (UTC−05:00)
- Dissipated: June 5, 2010 11:34 p.m. EDT (UTC−05:00)
- Duration: 14 minutes

EF4 tornado
- on the Enhanced Fujita scale
- Max width: 400 yards (0.23 mi; 0.37 km)
- Path length: 8.8 miles (14.2 km)
- Highest winds: 175 mph (282 km/h)

Overall effects
- Fatalities: 6 (+1 indirect)
- Injuries: 28
- Damage: $102.4 million (2010 USD)
- Part of the Tornado outbreak of June 5–6, 2010 and tornado outbreaks of 2010

During the night hours of June 5, 2010, a violent and destructive tornado struck parts of Moline, Lake Township, and Millbury, Ohio. The tornado, which was on the ground for 14 minutes along an 8.8 mile long and 400 yard wide path, killed 7 people and injured a further 28. The tornado produced damage that was deemed low-end EF4 strength by the National Weather Service in Cleveland, Ohio. This tornado was part of the June 5–6, 2010 tornado outbreak, which produced 52 other confirmed tornadoes, and was the deadliest tornado in Ohio since the 1985 Niles tornado.

The tornado first began in northeastern Wood County, striking a trailer park at EF0 intensity before overturning rail cars and entering Moline, where it caused damage ranging from EF1-EF2 intensity in the Indian Hills subdivision. After exiting town, the tornado intensified and caused EF3 damage as it destroyed two homes. Further to the east, the tornado destroyed the Lake Township Police Station, multiple airplane hangars, and the Lake High School at EF3 intensity. Lake Township's municipal building was also destroyed. The tornado then entered Millbury, briefly weakening before intensifying once again and causing EF4 damage on the northern side of Millbury, causing multiple fatalities. The tornado then entered Ottawa County, causing EF3 damage right before rapidly weakening and dissipating.

== Meteorological synopsis ==
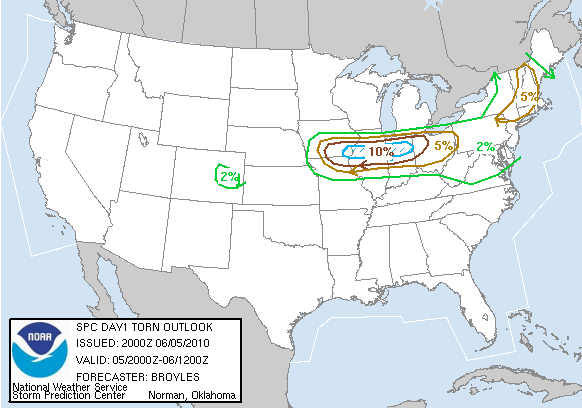
Preliminary tornado probability outlook from Storm Prediction Center, issued on June 5, 2010

A low pressure system moved across the central United States on June 5 where a moderate risk for severe thunderstorms was issued for areas along Interstate 80 from the Quad Cities area to near Cleveland, Ohio and Pittsburgh, Pennsylvania. Strong storms developed early in the afternoon across most of the area covered under the moderate risk and into central Iowa. Tornadoes were reported near Interstate 35 as well as in parts of central Ohio.

Severe weather shifted into Illinois during the early evening hours as the daytime heating and instability peaked. Tornadoes were reported in the Peoria, Illinois area as well as in areas just west of Chicago during the early evening hours. Heavy damage was reported in LaSalle County, Illinois as well as in Livingston County, Illinois. A tornado emergency was issued in the Peoria area after multiple sightings just outside the city. Heavy damage was reported in the Elmwood and Yates City area. In Streator, an EF2 tornado damaged 180 homes, destroyed 20 homes and injured 17 people. Two other tornadoes (rated EF0 and EF3) touched down just outside Streator as well, causing additional damage to homes and power lines. In Dwight a second EF2 tornado struck a mobile home park, destroying 12 homes and leaving several others uninhabitable. Other buildings were damaged in town and several well-built homes lost their roofs. Two separate EF0 tornadoes touched down in Dwight as well, causing damage to roofs, trees, and derailing a train. Six people were injured from the tornado, one of whom died from his injuries at the end of the month.

By 11:00 p.m., storms moved into northern Indiana, northern Ohio, southern Michigan and southwestern Ontario prompting a tornado warning to be issued for Lucas County and northern Wood County after the NEXRAD doppler weather radar indicated rotation. At 11:15 p.m., the tornado warning was extended into Ottawa County, and a tornado began along Oregon Road east of Perrysburg at 11:20 p.m.

== Tornado summary ==
=== Formation in Wood County & track towards Millbury ===
At 11:26 p.m., the tornado warning previously issued by the NWS at 11:15 P.m. was upgraded after the tornado was confirmed to be on the ground by spotters. Moving east-northeastwards with a forward speed of approximately 55 mph, the tornado struck the Friendly Village Trailer Park at EF0 intensity, damaging multiple trailers, flipping one, and downing trees. Further east, the tornado entered the Indian Hills Subdivision in Moline. Here, the tornado strengthened and gained EF1 intensity, inflicting damage to multiple homes. Towards the eastern side of the subdivision, the tornado further strengthened and inflicted EF2 damage to multiple homes, ranging from severe roof damage to the entire collapse of second floors. Exiting Moline, the tornado turned to the east and strengthened, destroying two homes at EF3 intensity and leaving another severely damaged.

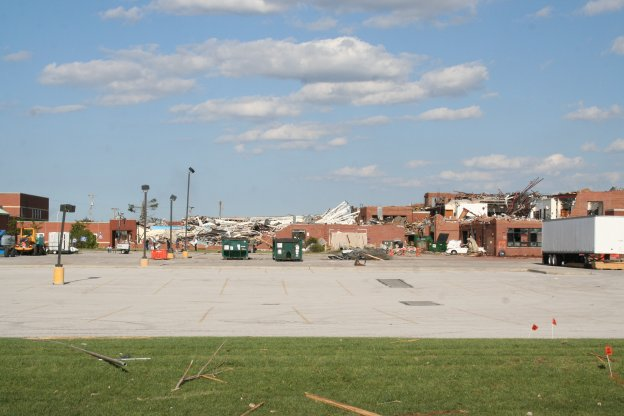
EF3 damage to Lake High School.

Turning east-northeastwards, the tornado overturned multiple rail cars before moving into Metcalf Field and slamming into the Lake Township Police Department, partially destroying the building, denuding trees, and throwing cars in the parking lot, including a police vehicle that was thrown nearly ½ of a mile and another wrapped around a tree. At the same time, Bailey Bowman and her boyfriend Gerald Lathrop were running towards the building in search of shelter, having seen the tornado in front of them while they were driving on SR 795. Bailey was struck by flying debris and killed, while her boyfriend survived. On Moline-Martin Road, multiple airport hangars were flattened and homes were destroyed as the tornado passed. In one of these homes, an elderly couple were sleeping when the tornado struck, collapsing the home around them. The wife survived, but the husband died of his injuries during the following day. The tornado then struck Lake High School just hours before the graduation of the Class of 2010, where multiple people huddled for shelter. The cafeteria and gymnasium were "totally destroyed", along with a large portion of the school's roof system. Multiple exterior and interior walls collapsed, and the nearby middle and elementary school also sustained significant roof damage. At least 8 school buses were overturned and destroyed. Another woman was killed here when she unwittingly drove into the tornado, having falsely believed that the tornado warning was over, leading her to drive south into Wood County and eventually the path of the tornado. Her daughters, following behind her, were also caught in the tornado, but survived despite both cars being destroyed. The tornado then crossed I-280 before downing multiple high-tension transmission towers along Pemberville Road as it approached Millbury.

=== Millbury & dissipation in Ottawa County ===
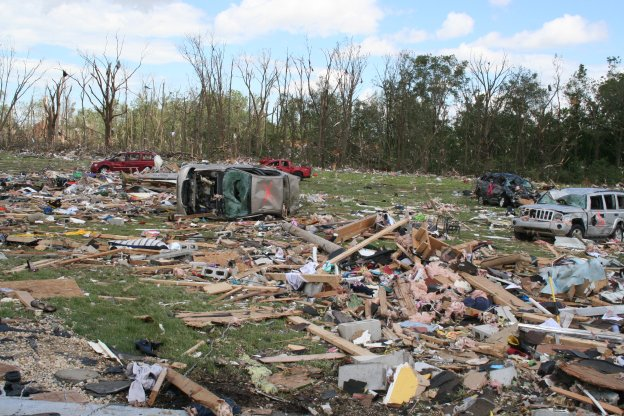
EF4 damage to multiple homes and vehicles in Millbury when the tornado was at peak intensity.

The tornado crossed Collins Road and entered Millbury, turning to the northeast and producing damage ranging from EF2-EF3 intensity. On Case Road, Ted Kranz was coming up the stairs of his basement to get his dog as the tornado struck and was killed. His daughter was the valedictorian of the graduating Class of 2010 in Lake High School, which had been destroyed just minutes prior. As the tornado continued northeast, it further intensified and gained EF4 intensity along Main Street. 6 homes were destroyed, with some being swept entirely off of their foundations. A grove hardwood tree that was also in the area was stripped of all of its limbs and mostly debarked. In one of these homes, the Walters family was sleeping when the tornado struck. The mother and her 4 year old son were killed instantly when the tornado hit, and the father died of his injuries in the hospital on June 12, leaving their 7 year old daughter the only survivor of the tornado. Approaching SR 51, the tornado began to weaken again and inflicted EF3 damage to buildings and trees. Entering Ottawa County, the tornado caused EF2 damage on the intersection of Fostoria & Trowbridge Road, then caused EF3 damage again north of Trowbridge Road. At this point, the tornado began to turn towards the southeast. Near the intersection of Trowbridge and Billman Road, the tornado damaged more homes before causing a final area of EF3 damage as homes were destroyed on Reiman Road, rapidly weakening and dissipating at 11:34 p.m. EDT.

== Aftermath ==
After the tornado dissipated, responders searched through debris for trapped or missing individuals. The state of Ohio approved grants for victims in Wood and Ottawa counties to aid in recovery. The Millbury tornado destroyed at least 60 homes along its 8.8 mile long path over the course of 14 minutes. Debris from the tornado was found dozens of miles away, in some cases as far out as Lake Erie. The tornado produced $102.4 million (2010 USD) worth of damages, killing 7 and injuring a further 28. It was the second deadliest tornado of 2010 behind the Yazoo City tornado, and both the first deadly & first violent tornado in Ohio since the 2002 Van Wert tornado. It was the deadliest tornado in Ohio since the 1985 Niles-Wheatland tornado. By June 2025, it ranked as the sixth deadliest and was of the top 5 costliest tornadoes, and as of September 2025, it is one of only two tornadoes in Ohio rated EF4+ on the Enhanced Fujita Scale, the other being the 2019 Dayton tornado.

== See also ==
- Tornadoes of 2010
- List of F4 and EF4 tornadoes (2010–2019)
- List of North American tornadoes and tornado outbreaks
