= Where Have All the Bullets Gone? =

1985 war memoir by Spike Milligan

- Author: Spike Milligan
- Language: English
- Series: War memoirs
- Genre: Autobiography, comedy, military history
- Publisher: M.J. Joseph (UK); Penguin Books (paperback)
- Publication date: 1985
- Publication place: United Kingdom
- Media type: Print (Hardcover & Paperback)
- Pages: 256
- ISBN: 0718124308
- Dewey Decimal: 940.54/81/41
- LC Class: D811 .M516 1985
- Preceded by: Mussolini: His Part in My Downfall
- Followed by: Goodbye Soldier
- Website: www.spikemilligan.co.uk

Where Have All the Bullets Gone? is a war memoir by British comedian and author Spike Milligan first published in 1985. It is the fifth volume of Milligan's seven-part autobiographical series chronicling his experiences during World War II. The title is a humorous twist on the folk song "Where Have All the Flowers Gone?" by Pete Seeger. The book covers Milligan's service in the latter half of the war, focusing on his time as a gunner in the Royal Artillery during the Italian Campaign as well as his career as an entertainer for the large group.

== See also ==
- Adolf Hitler: My Part in His Downfall
- "Rommel?" "Gunner Who?"
- Monty: His Part in My Victory
- Mussolini: His Part in My Downfall
- Goodbye Soldier
- Peace Work
