= Julia Breck =

British actress (1941–2020)

- Born: 22 August 1941; Newport, Isle of Wight
- Died: 28 January 2020 (aged 78)
- Occupations: Actress and "glamour stooge"
- Notable work: Q...

Julia Breck (22 August 1941 – 28 January 2020) was a British actress from Newport, Isle of Wight.

She is best known for her frequent appearances in Spike Milligan's Q series (1975–80), in which she generally appeared as a buxom "glamour stooge". Breck also appeared in Monty Python's Flying Circus, On the Buses, The Two Ronnies and Some Mothers Do 'Ave 'Em.

She also appeared in many theatre productions, playing everything from principal boy in pantomime, to Lady Macbeth. She appeared in Andy Warhol's first play, Pork.

Following a final series with Milligan, There's a Lot of It About in 1982, Breck decided to retire from show business to concentrate on raising her three children whilst pursuing art and model-making as a hobby. She was married to Alexander (Sandy) Paterson (1979–her death), a well-known internet crossword compiler known as "Arena", and was previously married to Brian Coburn (1970 – ?) (divorced). She lived with her husband in France

In her later years, Breck was a set designer for the Théâtre Comœdia in Marmande, France. She died in January 2020 at the age of 78.

== TV shows ==
- Oh In Colour (BBC, 1970)
- On the Buses (1972)
- The Liver Birds ((BBC, Mon 25 Feb 1972)
- Some Mothers Do 'Ave 'Em (1973)
- Monty Python's Flying Circus (BBC, 1972)
- The Last Turkey in the Shop Show (BBC, 8:30pm Mon 23 Dec 1974, BBC2)
- Q (Q6, Q7, Q8, Q9) (BBC, 1975–1980)
- There's a Lot of It About (BBC, 1982)
- The Two Ronnies at the Movies (BBC, broadcast 1999)
- Room at the Top
