= Goodbye Soldier =

1986 book by Spike Milligan

- First edition (h/b)
- Author: Spike Milligan
- Language: English
- Genre: Autobiography
- Publisher: Michael Joseph (hardback), Penguin Books (paperback)
- Publication date: 1986
- Publication place: England
- Media type: Print (hardback and paperback)
- Pages: 276 (paperback)
- ISBN: 978-0-7181-2504-2
- OCLC: 18192535
- Preceded by: Where Have All the Bullets Gone?
- Followed by: Peace Work

Goodbye Soldier is Spike Milligan's sixth volume of autobiography. While he began writing it immediately after finishing Where Have All the Bullets Gone? in 1985, he finished it in a manic two week period in early 1986.

World War II has ended, Milligan continues NAAFI performances. During this time in Italy and Austria he tours with a large group as one of The Bill Hall Trio. While music and war were backdrops for the first books, music and his relationship with Toni Fontana are here. (A relationship described in longings using tourist-guide Italian, and a repetitive fascination with being called “Terr-ee”.) The book covers June to September 1946, at which point Milligan is released from service and sails home for England. The text is a fifth shorter than the longest volume Mussolini: His Part in My Downfall. The jokes are sometimes sparse.

Unlike the people he occasionally performed with during the war, with whom Milligan later worked or who otherwise became notable, Milligan spends a page suggesting the NAAFI tour group were “bloody awful”, and that “...none of them were ever heard of again”. (p. 111) But he says of Bill Hall:

”God, what a strange man, but a genius of a musician. When he died a few years ago, I realized that a genius could die unsung.” (p. 37)

Italian ballerina Toni Fontana, a member of the group, is Milligan’s almost exclusive love interest. Milligan’s speaks little Italian, and she speaks fluent English, but not always up to Milligan’s verbal horseplay. Beyond reflections on how wonderful Milligan is, that it’s too hot, or too crowded, her opinions aren't described much— she says that Mussolini “was not a bad man, just stupid”.

”Were we sure we were in love? The answer seemed to be yes. So, what do we do? Do we get engaged? I think if I had asked her, she would have said yes.” (p. 109)

(Milligan “...frequently said she was the love of his life. And they used to meet in Paris right up to the time he became too frail to travel.”)

When not with Toni, Milligan plays or listens to music, or reads. “…we retire to my room for two hours and play those jazz standards I still love, ‘Georgia Brown’, ‘Poor Butterfly’, ‘What’s New’, ‘Sophisticated Lady’” (p. 30). There is music on the long bus trips between gigs.

”Hall produces his violin and plays Italian melodies. The Italians join in. I know this all may sound repetitive, but that’s how it was. We were all very repetitive.” (p. 161)

Milligan amplifies on a theme from "Rommel?" "Gunner Who?" — the effect of popular culture on his life expectations:

”For me, the real world didn’t exist, so I grew up emotionally deformed....I was still wrapped up in the aura of the last film I had seen....The tram, the fog-ridden cold morning outside were all imaginary. They would all disappear when I saw my next Bing Crosby film. Most of my middle life would be spent trying to escape from their cloying influence....It wasn’t until I saw The Grapes of Wrath that I saw a real film.” (p. 189)

As with earlier volumes, it is not always clear what is contrived. Illustratively, Milligan quotes two diary sentences, then expands them into a page of description (pp. 268-9). Other inserts are definitely contrived, such as quoting Hitler, “'You see, you Russian fools? Zey are already starting to like back us Germans!'” (p. 100).
