= Adolf Hitler: My Part in His Downfall =

1971 war memoir by Spike Milligan

- Front cover of the 1971 first hardback edition
- Author: Spike Milligan
- Illustrator: Spike Milligan
- Genre: War memoirs
- Publisher: Michael Joseph
- Publication date: 1971
- Publication place: England
- Media type: Print (hardback and paperback)
- Pages: 144
- Followed by: "Rommel?" "Gunner Who?"

Adolf Hitler: My Part in His Downfall, published in 1971, is the first volume of Spike Milligan's war memoirs. The book spans the period from Britain's declaration of war on Germany to when Milligan lands in Algeria as a part of the Allied liberation of Africa.

The preface anticipates the book will be part of a trilogy; years later, the cover of the fourth volume said: "Don't be fooled this is the last, volume four of the war memoirs." Ultimately, however, Milligan published seven volumes covering his war service, his first nervous breakdown and reallocation to rear-echelon duties, his demob and early years trying to break into the entertainment industry. In Mussolini: His Part in My Downfall, having been stung by a critic who called the biographies unreliable, Milligan wrote, "I wish the reader to know that he is not reading a tissue of lies and fancies, it all really happened."

The presentation is an unusual format freely mixing narrative anecdotes, contemporary photography, excerpts from diaries, letters, rough sketches and performance programs, along with comic sketches and absurd fake memoranda from ranking Nazi officials; the hard facts are usually apparent. Milligan says in the preface: "All the salient facts are true"; at the end of the preface: "There were the deaths of some of my friends, and therefore, no matter how funny I tried to make this book, that will always be at the back of my mind: but, were they alive today, they would have been the first to join in the laughter, and that laughter was, I'm sure, the key to victory."

The book was made into a film with the same title and adapted into a stage play.

== Summary ==
=== Prologue ===
The prologue consists of only two sentences, which in itself represents the word-play humour that was Milligan's hallmark: "After Puckoon I swore I would never write another novel. This is it."^{[b]}

=== Part 1 ===
Milligan is at home with his family. His mother is digging the air-raid shelter when Neville Chamberlain announces that Britain is at war with Germany. The family response is for Spike, his father and brother to produce boyish drawings of war machines (the drawings are included in the book), which are taken to the War Office.

Milligan receives a letter marked O.H.M.S., which his uncle advises him not to open. After some weeks similar letters arrive marked "Urgent". Eventually he opens one containing a "cunningly worded invitation to partake in World War II". About then, in an attempt to impress girls at a gym, he slips a disc, whereupon he's hospitalised to determine whether he's faking. After three months of avoiding call-up, he is given "a train ticket and a picture of Hitler reading "This is your enemy". He searches the train, but can't find him.

"I got off at Bexhill-on-Sea. It wasn't easy – the train didn't stop there".

=== Part 2 ===
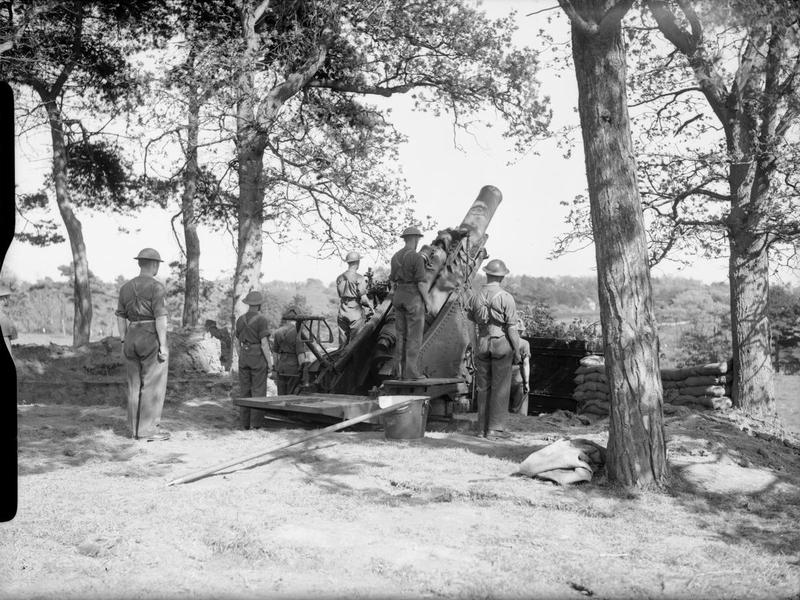
Members of 56th Heavy Regiment with a BL 9.2-inch Howitzer, Hastings, May 1940

Part 2 lasts 13 pages, much of it illustrations by Milligan or photographs. He begins his months in military training at Bexhill-on-Sea. It starts with Milligan joining his regiment (56th Heavy Regiment Royal Artillery) late and immediately being singled out as a troublemaker. He learns disrespect for certain officers within a few sentences and commences sniping:

"I suppose," said Suitcase, "you know you are three months late arriving?"
"I'll make up for it sir, I'll fight nights as well!"

Milligan refers to his first commanding officer as "Leather Suitcase" for the numerous leather patches on his uniform. Suitcase is an officious peacetime officer with no field experience. He is removed when General Montgomery takes over. The regiment is also blessed with soldiers who are no use to anybody, disruptive or even mentally disturbed. These men are sometimes "posted", which is described in a footnote as "the art of being shifted sideways". At any given time, according to Milligan, hundreds of men were in transit between regiments that didn't want them. Milligan then facetiously describes the last of them as being found "naked save for a vest one sock" sitting on the back of a lorry, "waiting to be posted".

Milligan talks to soldiers returning from Dunkirk and sees his first German plane. His regiment is equipped with the obsolete BL 9.2-inch howitzer. Gun drill includes the crews shouting "bang" in unison as they have no shells to practice with. A shell from World War I is eventually found and they make strenuous attempts to fire it for practice. It's a dud. A year passes, Milligan trains, the summer months are pleasant. One of the gunners, however, loses a hand when a shell he is pushing into the howitzer's breech explodes.

=== Part 3 ===
Part 3 begins a year previously, and launches into a favourite Milligan literary aside—a long discussion of setting up musical shows, including names of songs, instruments and players. It is while playing jazz that he meets his lifelong friend, self-taught pianist Harry Edgington, a man "with moral scruples that would have pleased Jesus". (In the biographies, Milligan variously portrays himself as licentious or unusually chaste.) The group of pick-up military musicians practices for a month, then are asked to give their first gig in Bexhill Old Town Church Hall. (Milligan's military career shifts between his duties as a gunner and musical performances.) Milligan notes that until 1940 they were entertaining nightly, which he later saw as his first steps into show business. He is left off long enough to go to a BBC musician contest, where as a trumpet player, he wins a recording session with an established artist. He cuts his first records, then returns to barracks.

With the introduction of the new C.O. Major Chaterjack, Milligan meets an officer for whom he has great respect ("one who I would have followed anywhere"). 1940 ends and the 19th Battery has the luxury of being billeted in an empty girls' school. They are re-equipped with new 7.2 inch howitzers which they tow around Sussex during combat exercises. Milligan is trained for signalling duties. He arranges to spend a great deal of time at "Observation Posts" where his only duty is to test the radio once an hour. The rest of the time he spends listening to music.

The "Goon" characters had first appeared in the Popeye cartoons in the 1930s. Milligan, Edgington and others now start to dress like these characters, fashioning clubs and running into the woods shouting gibberish. Although they are disciplined and made to burn the clubs, it is here that the inspiration for The Goon Show began.

The book quotes at length from the regimental war diary, describing an extraordinary day when the War Office (now the Ministry of Defence) was alerted to a sea invasion—in what was intended to be an exercise. The author now confesses that he, in error, left the word "PRACTICE" out of a transmission.

Milligan also quotes the memoirs of noted theatre director John Counsell, his sometime deputy battery commander, who noted the laughter in the ranks when Milligan was around, and then after the war, at the height of the Goons' fame, queued with his daughter for autographs. He received one that showed Milligan remembered him with respect and affection.

Edgington and Milligan write "reams" of scenes that Milligan reckons were the beginnings of The Goon Show. He quotes the following from Edgington's writings:

The door flew open and in crashed the master-spy himself, Gruenthaphartz, measuring five rounds gun-fire by inches three, and clad only in a huge fur coat of huge fur, a sou'wester, and two hand-painted barges strapped to his feet for a quick getaway. With a hairy on the knee. He was escorted by a plague of Zeppelins. (p 99)

Some Goon Show scripts feature the names of places where the regiment was encamped. Bexhill, Pevensey Bay, and "Robin's Post" (a private house used by the regiment) each have a script named for them.

During one training deployment, Milligan and others were caught hiding their rifles in a loft, resulting in two weeks detention. Milligan was sent alone to Preston Barracks, in Brighton, to serve his sentence. While there he was given the usual punitive tasks such as shovelling coke into a single pile in pouring rain, but his guards also appreciated his artistic ability, and he was asked to draw Vargas girls for them to hang on the wall. Ironically, his release coincided with another regimental re-location, and he found himself back in Bexhill, where he started.

Amid the army stories, he mentions a topic he returns to, the (actual) exceptional ability of their artillery battery. By August 1942 they had learned to drive and how to fire machine guns. In December 1942, Milligan drinks a toast with his family that will prove to be the last for ten years. On 8 January, they head to sea.

Their band has been warned by an officer, that if they smuggle their instruments on board, the instruments will be thrown overboard. Later in voyage, after a miserable passage, the officer asks if the instruments are actually on board (which they are) and will the band please play to entertain the men. Algeria comes into view.

We were issued with an air-mail letter, in which we were allowed to say we'd arrived safe and sound....From now, all mail was censored. We were no longer allowed to give the number of troops, measurements of guns and ammo returns to the German Embassy in Spain. This, of course, would cut down our income considerably. (p 140)

Milligan describes the sunrise there in January 1943:

...there is no light so full of hope as the dawn; amber, resin, copper lake, brass green. One by one, they shed themselves until the sun rose golden in a white sky...I closed my eyes and turned my face to the sun. I fell down a hatchway. (p 140)

Lacking the proper material, lime, a Sanitary Orderly mistakenly lines a latrine pit with a mixture of petrol and diesel. A sergeant-major lights a pipe and drops the match while using it, causing an explosion and second degree burns on the bum.

A sort of British loss of face. He was our last casualty before we actually went into action. Next time it would be for real. (p. 144)

== Adaptations ==
The film Adolf Hitler: My Part in His Downfall (1972) was produced by Gregory Smith and Norman Cohen, and directed by Norman Cohen. It stars Jim Dale as the young Spike, Arthur Lowe and Bill Maynard, with a cameo appearance by Milligan as his own father.

The book was adapted into an LP record released by Columbia/EMI in 1981. It featured Milligan narrating the story plus Milligan, John Wells, Graham Stark and Alan Clare acting out some scenes. Milligan also plays trumpet and saxophone for some of the backing music.

A stage play had live musical numbers by Ben Power and Tim Carroll, who also directed. This production toured the UK from July 2009 and until mid-2010.
