= Oh in Colour =

1970 British TV comedy series

- Oh in Colour title screen.
- Genre: Comedy
- Created by: Spike Milligan; John Antrobus
- Directed by: John Howard Davies; Joseph McGrath; Duncan Wood
- Starring: Spike Milligan; John Bluthal; Charlie Young Atom; Alan Clare; Edward Underdown
- Country of origin: United Kingdom
- No. of episodes: 6

Production
- Running time: 30 minutes

Original release
- Network: BBC
- Release: 27 September – 1 November 1970

Oh in Colour is a comedy television sketch programme broadcast on BBC 2 in 1970. It ran for one six-episode series from September to November 1970. It was written by and featured Spike Milligan, who was accompanied by different stars every week. It was shown after the more popular Q5, also written by Milligan and Neil Shand. It is likely the programme was written to bridge the long production gap between Q5 and the next series, Q6, which did not appear on TV until 1975. (Milligan later complained of the BBC's cold attitude towards the series and stated that he would have made more programmes had he been given the opportunity.)

== Relation to Q.. ==
The format is essentially identical to Milligan's Q series; a series of madcap sketches, typically lacking in plot or cohesion, with the cast and crew often donning bizarre or inappropriate outfits during pieces. The show ran for 30 minutes without commercial breaks, as is typical for programmes broadcast on the BBC. Oh in Colour was broadcast in colour, however the only surviving colour sequence is from episode six, the final broadcast. The entire series ironically exists as black-and-white telerecordings made for foreign sale.

One can find the racial gags that mired the Q... series in controversy. The cast are similar, too, with mainstays John Bluthal and Fanny Carby taking part in both programmes.

== Episodes ==
Series No.	Episode No.	Title	Original air date
1	1	Unknown	27 September 1970
1	2	Unknown	4 October 1970
1	3	Unknown	11 October 1970
1	4	Unknown	18 October 1970
1	5	Unknown	25 October 1970
1	6	Unknown	1 November 1970
