= Peace Work =

1991 book of memoirs by Spike Milligan

- Author: Spike Milligan
- Language: English
- Genre: Autobiography, Comic novel, Satire
- Publisher: Michael Joseph (hardback), Penguin Books (paperback)
- Publication date: 1991
- Publication place: England
- Media type: Print (hardback and paperback)
- Pages: 239 (paperback)
- ISBN: 0-71-813533-4 (hardback), 0-14-014970-8 (paperback)
- OCLC: 101317496
- Dewey Decimal: 828.91407
- LC Class: PR6063.I3777
- Preceded by: Goodbye Soldier

The seventh volume of Spike Milligan's war memoirs, Peace Work, was first published in September, 1991, five years after the sixth volume Goodbye Soldier.

Unlike previous volumes, there is no preface, foreword or leading disclaimers.

This book spans the period between Spike's release from Combined Services Entertainment in Italy in October, 1946, and the start of his career as a writer for Derek Roy's BBC Radio show in October, 1949.

== Summary ==
Spike is released from his contract with Combined Services Entertainment (CSE) in Naples, Italy at the end of October, 1946, and departs for the UK on the QSMV Dominion Monarch.

Shortly after returning home, he looks up his Army and CSE mates Bill Hall and Johnny Mulgrew to restart The Bill Hall Trio in civilian life. They play at numerous venues around London, as well as Blackpool, Glasgow and Dublin. They even get a gig on BBC Television's Rooftop Rendezvous produced by Richard Afton. They next proceed to perform at the Zuka Exposition in Zürich, Switzerland. At the end of that engagement, they sign with a Signor Ivaldi to tour Italy, but head back to the UK first.

The Trio returns to Italy, where Spike again meets his first love, Maria Antoinetta Fontana. But the romance is over. The trio perform in Rome, Milan, Trieste and a remote U.S. Army post in Isonzo on the Italian/Yugoslav border. At this remote post they perform four times in front-line dugouts for the small groups of soldiers manning them. They return to Milan, and are next booked in Verona. Their contract with Ivaldi ends, and they detour to visit a friend in Porto Cannero on Lake Maggiore before returning to the United Kingdom. Their next gig is another Army Welfare tour with stops in Berlin, Hanover and Minden.

When they return home to the UK, Spike leaves the Bill Hall Trio and joins the Ann Lenner Trio with Anne Lenner and old friend Reg O'List. Their first engagement is another Army Welfare Show called Swinging Along. They perform in Hamburg, Celle, Hanover, Kronenberg and Klagenfurt.

Spike leaves trio after returning home. He then reconnects with his Army acquaintance Harry Secombe, a fellow Lance Bombardier, and met Peter Sellers and Michael Bentine. They refer to themselves as 'The Goons' but just do informal ad-lib sessions. Spike finally gets a solo booking as part of a variety group for another tour of Germany, this time in the U.S. Occupied Zone. He performs in Berlin, Hanover and Munich.

After returning from this tour, and as the book ends, Spike living and writing scripts with Jimmy Grafton for Derek Roy's BBC Radio show.
