= On the Ning Nang Nong =

1959 poem by Spike Milligan

- by Spike Milligan
- First published in: Silly Verse for Kids
- Illustrator: Spike Milligan
- Genre(s): Comedy, Nonsense poetry, Children's poetry, Tongue twisters
- Rhyme scheme: AAB CCB DDB AA CC DD AA
- Publisher: Dobson Books
- Publication date: 1959
- Lines: 17

"On the Ning Nang Nong" is a children's poem by the comedian Spike Milligan first published in his 1959 book Silly Verse for Kids. A tongue twister and nonsense poem, it makes heavy use of made-up words, mismatching onomatopoeia, and alliteration. The poem was written for Milligan's children as part of his Silly Verse for Kids and has since come to be a favourite poem for young children.

In 1998 it was voted the UK's favourite comic poem in a nationwide poll, ahead of other nonsense poems by poets such as Lewis Carroll and Edward Lear. It has been set to music multiple times, notably for the ABC children's programme Play School, and is one of the most taught poems in UK primary schools.

== Poem ==
The 17-line children's poem opens with:

On the Ning Nang Nong
Where the Cows go Bong!
And the Monkeys all say Boo!

Subsequent lines also use nonsensical onomatopoeia—like teapots going "Jibber Jabber Joo"—to create a silly imaginative world, until the narrator finally laments "What a noisy place to belong / Is the Ning Nang Ning Nang Nong".

In the collection of poetry chosen by children, I Like This Poem, one child said they enjoyed it "because the animals say different things to what they really say". Drawing on this comment, Rod McGillis says the poem reflects children's inherent love for noise and their affinity for the absurd and unexpected; it allows them to play with sounds without needing to make sense. A paper in Practically Primary likewise states that children naturally enjoy playing with words through rhythm and rhyme, which is successfully captured by the poem.

Michael Heyman calls Silly Verse for Kids a revival of the nonsense verse of Victorian poets like Edward Lear and Lewis Carroll, and says that the nonsense is complemented by silly illustrations by Milligan shown beside the poems. "On the Ning Nang Nong" uses nonsense words to create a strong, comedic rhythm, emphasising the sound of the poem when read aloud over meaning. According to the book Silliness: A Serious History, the nonsense words chosen are uncomplicated and could easily be made up by children, creating a sense of identification with the poem.

The poem also makes use of alliteration and simple rhymes, resulting in a tongue twister effect. Structurally, the poem is composed of two halves of eight lines separated by the central line "And you just can't catch 'em when they do!" (referring to mice that go clang). The rhyme scheme and metre shift in the second half of the poem with the lines beginning to "scurry away from the central line", which McGillis interprets as "formal proof" that "you just can't catch 'em when they do!"

== Publication and reception ==
"On the Ning Nang Nong" was written by the comedian Spike Milligan, best known as the main writer of the BBC radio programme The Goon Show. Milligan wrote the poem and others for his collection Silly Verse for Kids during a time of great disruption in his personal life, with his marriage failing and while he was in the midst of depression. Fearful that he would be separated from his children, he wanted to create something for them to show them that he loved them. He felt that poems came naturally to him and he did not edit them after coming up with the initial ideas; many derived from things he heard his children say. He finished writing the collection by April 1959.

Silly Verse for Kids was released in December 1959 and was successful enough to be reprinted immediately. In a review in the Liverpool Daily Post at the time, Peter Eckersley critiqued the illustrations but said "On the Ning Nang Nong" would be irresistible to most children. It has been noted as a favourite poem for children for decades after its release, particularly preschoolers and young primary school children. Former Children's Laureate Michael Rosen has called the poem "utterly infectious" and said that school children cannot help but learn it because "[e]very single word has got a big hook on it which says, 'Remember me.'"

In 1998 it was voted the UK's favourite comic poem in a nationwide poll, ahead of other nonsense poems by Lewis Carroll and Edward Lear. In December 2007 it was reported that, according to Ofsted, it is among the ten most commonly taught poems in primary schools in the UK. Ofsted said this was part of a trend of primary school's focusing narrowly on light poetry that, although worthy of study, was at the expense of classic poems and poems from other cultures.

== Musical releases ==
In 1969, a version of "On the Ning Nang Nong" performed by Milligan was released as the B-side for the theme song for the BBC2 sketch show Q... "The Q5 Piano Tune" and was also included on the charity album No One's Gonna Change Our World. Another version was released on the 1974 album Badjelly the Witch, also by Milligan.

The poem, set to music with an accompanying claymation, was a popular feature on the ABC children's programme Play School; in one episode it was performed by many of the show's presenters throughout the years, including Monica Trapaga, George Spartels, Trisha Goddard, Justine Clarke, Noni Hazlehurst, John Hamblin and Benita Collings. A cover by Josh Thomas was performed for the programme's 50th anniversary and a new animated version was created for the 55th anniversary's "The Very Silly Special!"
