= The Looney: An Irish Fantasy =

1987 novel by Spike Milligan

- First edition
- Author: Spike Milligan
- Language: English
- Subject: Comic novel
- Genre: Comedy
- Publisher: Michael Joseph
- Publication date: 1987
- Publication place: United Kingdom
- Media type: Print (hardback & paperback)
- Pages: 192
- ISBN: 0-7181-2870-2
- OCLC: 60043977
- Preceded by: Puckoon

The Looney: An Irish Fantasy is a comic novel by Spike Milligan. It was first published in 1987 with the paperback edition in 1988. It is his second full-length original novel.

== Plot summary ==
The principal protagonist of the novel is Mick Looney, an Irish construction worker from Kilburn, London, who comes to the conclusion that he is the rightful King of Ireland.

The first portion of the novel is set in Kilburn as Looney's fantasy of royal descent takes hold. He purchases a second hand chair to be his royal throne while arranging his return to Ireland. There are a number of subplots featuring various eccentric people he has dealings with, the main one concerning two illegal immigrants from India who become Looney's tenants.

The second, larger, portion of the novel is set in and around the fictional Irish village of Drool, where Looney goes to research his royal claim. While doing this he takes a job as a handyman at the local castle, from which a valuable racehorse is stolen. After a number of subplots concerning the eccentric residents of Drool and its castle, Looney recovers the racehorse and receives a large cash reward, much of which he accidentally burns and the remainder of which he spends in the pub buying drinks for the villagers. Having reconnected with his Irish roots, but realising that his quest for wealth and status is futile, he returns to Kilburn and sells his "throne".

== Style ==
The book uses politically incorrect language and, as with much of Milligan's writing, makes use of national and racial stereotypes however Milligan dismissed the suggestion that this was itself racist. The most violently racist language and attitudes are ascribed to the most ignorant and unsympathetic characters, such as the neo-Nazi traffic warden.
