= Silly Verse for Kids =

1959 book by Spike Milligan

First edition

Silly Verse for Kids is a collection of humorous poems, limericks and drawings for children by Spike Milligan, first published by Dennis Dobson in 1959.

Silly Verse for Kids was Milligan's first book. Many of the pieces had been written to entertain his children, who inspired some of the poems. Their lengths vary: some are as short as four lines, and very few extend to more than one page. Most are accompanied by one or more of Milligan's drawings, a few of which do not relate to the poems. The collection includes "On the Ning Nang Nong".

Later editions combine the original content of Silly Verse for Kids with two of Milligan's later collections: A Dustbin of Milligan and The Little Pot Boiler, which had been published in 1961 and 1963 respectively.
