= The Ratties =

- Created by: Laura Milligan; Mike Wallis
- Written by: Laura Milligan; Mike Wallis
- Directed by: Mike Wallis
- Narrated by: Spike Milligan
- Theme music composer: Ed Welch
- Composer: James Harpen
- Country of origin: United Kingdom
- Original language: English
- No. of seasons: 1
- No. of episodes: 26

Production
- Producer: Mike Wallis
- Camera setup: Single-camera
- Production companies: Ratties, Ltd.; F-Productions; for Central

Original release
- Network: ITV
- Release: 9 November – 22 December 1988

The Ratties is a British animated series about a family of six rats who live in the wall of a country house. The rats try to emulate the human family who own the house.

The idea for The Ratties was conceived by Laura Milligan, daughter of comedian Spike Milligan. Laura Milligan and Mike Wallis developed the idea into a series of animated shorts; Wallis served as director and producer. Spike Milligan narrated the series with much of the narration ad libbed.

ITV aired 26 episodes in 1988; each episode is under five minutes in length. The series was repeated by ITV from 1991 to 1994.

== Characters ==
The eldest rats in the Ratty family are Uncle Matty and Aunt Hatty (the matron of the family who does all the housework). Tatty is an ambitious rat of the younger generation. The Fatty Brothers are playful and mischievous identical twins. Baby Batty is a child genius.

The Ratties share their home with Spatty, a spider who sometimes gets involved in the Ratties' adventures.

== Episodes ==
No.	Title	Original release date
1	"The Budgie"	1988
The audience is introduced to the Ratties and their energetic household. Tatty dresses as a budgerigar, and is adopted by an unsuspecting old woman.
2	"Polo Time"	1988
The gang goes to the royal polo match with the hopes of participating in some way.
3	"Rattiecadabra"	1988
The whole Ratty family comes together to put on a variety show.
4	"Circus Time"	1988
The Ratties put together a circus act.
5	"Glamour Time"	1988
Aunt Hatty is unhappy with her appearance. The Ratties bring her to the humans' bathroom to get some make-up.
6	"Gardening Time"	1988
The Ratties go outside to do some gardening and other various chores.
7	"Medical Time"	1988
The Ratties do some medical practices on each other as First Aiders.
8	"Alpine Time"	1988
The Ratty family goes out for a fun day in a winter wonderland.
9	"Sports Time"	1988
The Ratties host their own Olympic Games.
10	"Picnic Time"	1988
The Ratties go out for a picnic.
11	"Spring Cleaning Time"	1988
After playtime, the Ratties start cleaning up—and cause some chaos in the process.
12	"Sailing Time"	1988
After taking a bath, the Ratties set sail on an inflatable duck ship, and get involved in a yacht race.
13	"Baby Sitting"	1988
The Ratties are entrusted by Aunt Catty to look after her Baby Bummer, who is very energetic.
14	"The Great Escape"	1988
The Ratties are ambushed by the cat Old Tom, but they are able to outwit him.
15	"The Fatty Sisters"	1988
The Fatty Sisters pay a visit to the Ratties.
16	"Ballet Time"	1988
The Ratties receive a package of ballet shoes, which sparks a wild performance.
17	"Spooky Time"	1988
Supernatural events start to happy around the Ratties home at night.
18	"Holiday Time"	1988
The Ratties visit the seaside.
19	"Jumping Beans"	1988
The Ratties eat a plateful of beans that make them jumpy.
20	"Arty Time"	1988
The Ratties try some painting and sculpting.
21	"Raving Time"	1988
Aunt Hatty has a hard time waking her family from a self-hypnosis sleep.
22	"Cowboy Time"	1988
Inspired by their favourite TV show, the Ratties act out a wild western theme.
23	"Aerobics Time"	1988
The Ratties have a go at fitness and exercise.
24	"Cooking Time"	1988
The Ratties make Uncle Matty a birthday cake.
25	"Camping Time"	1988
The Ratties go camping, and find different ways to amuse themselves.
26	"Hawaii Time"	1988
The Ratties fly to Hawaii for their holiday.
