= A Book of Milliganimals =

1968 children's book by Spike Milligan

- First edition
- Author: Spike Milligan
- Illustrator: Spike Milligan
- Language: English
- Genre: Children's literature
- Publisher: Dobson Books Limited
- Publication date: 1968
- Publication place: United Kingdom
- Media type: Print (Hardback & Paperback)
- ISBN: 9780234770481

A Book of Milliganimals is a children's book by Spike Milligan, first published in 1968.

The book has three parts; the first two, Animals and Milliganimals, contain humorous poetry and illustrations by Milligan of animals, both real and imaginary. The third part, entitled The Bald Twit Lion, is a surreal, comedic story of a lion who loses his mane and his struggle to re-grow it and overcome his embarrassment. His mane is eventually restored by God, who slides down to Earth from Heaven on a religious giraffe's neck.
