= Derek Roy (comedian) =

English comedian (1922–1981)

- Born: 25 August 1922; London, England
- Died: 15 March 1981 (aged 58); Southampton, Hampshire, England
- Spouse: Rone Ricardo

Derek Roy (25 August 1922 – 15 March 1981) was an English comedian, whose public profile was at its greatest in the late 1940s and early 1950s.

== Biography ==
He was born in London, and made his first stage appearance at the age of 14. A broadcast with Henry Hall in 1942 led to his recruitment by orchestra leader Geraldo as resident vocalist and comedian. In 1946 he became resident comedian on the BBC radio show Variety Bandbox, sharing the role on alternate weeks with Frankie Howerd, with whom he developed a friendly rivalry. The talent show made known such performers as Michael Bentine, Jimmy Edwards, Tony Hancock, Alfred Marks, Morecambe and Wise, Harry Secombe, Peter Sellers, Graham Stark and Harry Worth.

Roy toured with his own company, and became well known in pantomimes for playing Buttons in Cinderella. He also sometimes performed as a pantomime dame. He topped the bill in touring variety shows, and appeared in the 1948 Royal Variety Performance. His BBC Radio show, Hip Hip Hoo Roy, was written by amongst others Spike Milligan, and was the show where Milligan's Goon Show character Eccles first appeared. Roy's unsuccessful star-vehicle Happy Go Lucky also gave the first writing break to Ray Galton and Alan Simpson, who would soon team up with the show's last producer Dennis Main Wilson to create Hancock's Half Hour.

He appeared in the film Dance With Me alongside Anne Shelton and Max Wall. In 1955, he also appeared on the first night of ITV. He remained popular through the 1950s and 1960s, especially in the Midlands. He starred in the revue Light Up the Town at the London Palladium in 1964, and made several successful tours of South Africa.

Roy was a resident of the large Art Deco apartment block, Du Cane Court in Balham, South London. A neighbour remembered: "He was short, plump and wore glasses; and besides being a stand-up comedian, he featured on an amusing radio variety show. He was well liked, well known and very vulgar. He... had a large dog which he would take on stage as part of his act".

He was married three times, and remarried his third wife after they had divorced. He died of cancer in Southampton in March 1981, aged 58.
