= Monty: His Part in My Victory =

- Cover of the 1976 first hardcover edition
- Author: Spike Milligan; Jack Hobbs editor
- Language: English
- Genre: Autobiography, Comic novel, Satire
- Publisher: Penguin Books
- Publication date: 1976
- Publication place: England
- Media type: Print (Hardback & Paperback)
- Pages: 128
- ISBN: 0-7181-1531-7 (hardback), 0140045031 (paperback)
- OCLC: 3069817
- Dewey Decimal: 940.54/81/41
- LC Class: D745.2 .M52
- Preceded by: "Rommel?" "Gunner Who?"
- Followed by: Mussolini: His Part in My Downfall

Monty: His Part in My Victory, Spike Milligan's third volume of war memoirs. Co-written with Jack Hobbs, it runs to only about 90 pages of text and recounts a period in which the Nazis have been defeated in Africa and Milligan is not fighting. The book mostly describes Milligan's activities on leave and plays in a band and minor adventures and tribulations while on duty. Events span from May to September 1943: just after Operation Torch, the liberation of Africa in World War II, to Milligan's embarkation for Salerno, Italy.

There is a mix of photos, sketches, letters and mischievous ersatz Nazi communiques that are similar to those in the earlier volumes in the series.

An audio version, recorded by Milligan, was released on 30 October 1997.

== Summary ==
With the fall of Tunis in 1943, the Nazis surrender in Africa. Milligan has varied impressions:

Dead soldiers in grotesque ballet positions, Arab families emerging from hiding, baffled and frightened, and the children, always the children, more baffled and frightened than the rest.

An odd atmosphere pervades, where enemy soldiers are found chatting together on the streets; a group of Italian soldiers tries to surrender to Milligan and his friends: they tell the Italians that they are British Army prisoners (i.e., to go away). The regiment's Lieutenant asks two German officers drinking coffee in a cafe what they are doing: "Ve are vaiting to be took prisoners old poy."

There is time on leave, in celebration parades and in performing shows; the most traumatic experience is the transfer of Major Chater Jack, leaving the battery now without two of their favourite officers. Major "Jumbo" Jenkins, a humourless, unpleasant martinet is the replacement, with consequences for Milligan in the next volume.

They move to various locations, some flat and barren. During one war game exercise, Milligan asks if they can "kill" themselves so they can play cards. The Lieutenant suggests lunch, first. A referee rides up and marks them with chalk — they are casualties. Remounting his motorcycle, he breaks his leg; Milligan marks him with the chalk. In a camp where Milligan builds an elaborate tent, a friend bets Milligan and Edgington he can get them out in two minutes; he sets a Bren Carrier toward their tent, unpiloted. Milligan and Edgington move the tent, still inside. Writes Milligan, "We were all bloody mad."

While Milligan points out to the reader that shows cannot be described, one must be there, he describes at length a series of musical activities and successful shows, culminating in one directed by Kenneth Carter, later a British producer and director. (The playbill is reproduced.)

With the invasion of Sicily, the idyllic days are over. Milligan thinks about rewriting his will, since the last one was about getting killed in the Africa landings, not the Italian ones. He concludes the book on the ship HMS Boxer:

"'I wonder why we're waiting?'...
'We're waiting for the tide,' says Kidgell.
'That's the best news I've had.'
'Why?'
'The Med's tideless.'"

Milligan does not know the gravity of the situation at Salerno, until reading General Alexander's biography, twenty years later. The fighting starts in the next volume, soon after they have landed.
