= Puckoon =

1963 comic novel by Spike Milligan

- First edition
- Author: Spike Milligan
- Illustrator: Spike Milligan
- Subject: Comic novel
- Genre: Comedy
- Publisher: Anthony Blond
- Publication date: 1963
- Publication place: United Kingdom
- Followed by: The Looney: An Irish Fantasy

Puckoon is a comic novel by Spike Milligan, first published in 1963. It is his first full-length novel, and only major fictional work. Set in 1924, it details the troubles brought to the fictional Irish village of Puckoon by the Partition of Ireland: the new border, due to the incompetence of the Boundary Commission, passes directly through the village, with most of the village placed in the independent Irish Free State, but with a significant portion to Northern Ireland.

The protagonist of the novel is the feckless Dan Milligan, a man so lazy that the author is obliged to take direct action to prevent him spending the entire novel lounging about at home; thus alerted to his status as a fictional character, Dan frequently breaks the fourth wall, speaking directly to the writer about the trouble he has been made to endure.

== Adaptations ==
An abridged audiobook version, read by the author, was released on LP and cassette. A different, approximately 2-hour long reading, was broadcast on BBC Radio (date not established).

A film adaptation, written and directed by Terence Ryan, was released in 2002. It stars Sean Hughes as the renamed "Dan Madigan" and Richard Attenborough (in his final film role) as the narrator (after Spike Milligan's poor health prevented him from taking the part), along with British, Irish and American character actors including Elliott Gould, Griff Rhys Jones, Milo O'Shea, David Kelly, Marc Sinden, Daragh O'Malley, Nickolas Grace and Freddie Jones. Jane Milligan (Spike's daughter) appeared in the small role of Mrs. Madigan. The film was cast by Jo Gilbert and shot in Belfast, Northern Ireland.

Puckoon was adapted for the stage in 2009, and toured Ireland and the United Kingdom.

An adaptation by Ian Billings, narrated by Barry Cryer and starring Ed Byrne as Dan Milligan and Pauline McLynn was broadcast on BBC Radio 4 in December 2019.
