= Spike Milligan =

Irish comedian and writer (1918–2002)

Spike Milligan KBE
- Milligan, c. 1990
- Born: Terence Alan Milligan; 16 April 1918; Ahmednagar, British Raj
- Died: 27 February 2002 (aged 83); Rye, East Sussex, England
- Resting place: St Thomas's Church, Winchelsea, East Sussex, England
- Occupations: Comedian; writer; musician; poet; playwright; actor
- Years active: 1951–2002
- Spouses: June Marchini/Marlowe (m. 1952; div. 1960); Patricia Ridgway (m. 1962; died 1978); Shelagh Sinclair (m. 1983)
- Children: 6
- Military career
- Allegiance: United Kingdom
- Branch: British Army
- Service years: 1940–1945
- Rank: Lance bombardier
- Unit: Royal Artillery
- Conflicts: Second World War

Terence Alan "Spike" Milligan (16 April 1918 – 27 February 2002) was an English-Irish (Note: Milligan was half English and half Irish, and felt that he was entitled to British citizenship, especially after having served in the British Army for six years. When British law related to Commonwealth-born residents (which had given him a secure place in the UK) changed, he applied for a British passport in 1960. The application was refused, partly because he would not swear an Oath of Allegiance. He avoided statelessness by becoming an Irish citizen in 1962 and remained so for the rest of his life.) comedian, writer, musician, poet, playwright and actor. The son of an English mother and Irish father, he was born in British India, where he spent his childhood before relocating in 1931 to England, where he lived and worked for the majority of his life.

Milligan was the co-creator, main writer, and a principal cast member of the British radio comedy programme The Goon Show, performing a range of roles including the characters Eccles, Minnie Bannister and Count Jim Moriarty. He was the earliest-born and last surviving member of the Goons. He took his success with The Goon Show into television with Q5, a surreal sketch show credited as a major influence on the members of Monty Python's Flying Circus.

He wrote and edited many books, including Puckoon (1963) and a seven-volume autobiographical account of his time serving during the Second World War, beginning with Adolf Hitler: My Part in His Downfall (1971). He also wrote comical verse, with much of his poetry written for children, including Silly Verse for Kids (1959).

== Early life and education ==
Terence Alan Milligan was born in Ahmednagar, India, on 16 April 1918 during the British Raj, the son of an Irish father, Leo Alphonso Milligan, a regimental sergeant-major in the British Indian Army, and English mother, Florence Mary Winifred (née Kettleband). He spent his childhood in Poona and later in Rangoon, then capital of British Burma. He was educated at the Convent of Jesus and Mary, Poona, and later at St Paul's High School, Rangoon. His father remained in the Indian Army after the end of the First World War, steadily promoted till "the family's lifestyle became almost lavish"; Milligan considered that "My old man lived the life of a gentleman on sergeant's pay".

After Army cuts meant his father's position was no longer required, Milligan travelled by sea, from India to England for the first time. He arrived on a winter's morning and was bemused by the climate, so different from India's, remembering the dock's "terrible noise, and everything so cold and grey." The Milligan family lived in England in somewhat straitened circumstances, Leo Milligan only being able to find "a poorly paid job in the Associated Press photo library"; Milligan recalled his mother being "often tense and angry... a domestic tyrant" due to having to manage on "next to no income". After moving to Brockley, south east London from the age of 12 in 1931, Milligan attended Brownhill Road School (later to be renamed Catford Boys School) and St Saviours School, Lewisham High Road.

After leaving school, he worked as a clerk in the Woolwich Arsenal, played the cornet and discovered jazz. He also joined the Young Communist League to demonstrate his hatred of Oswald Mosley's British Union of Fascists, who were gaining support near his home in south London. Disliking his first name, he began to call himself "Spike" after hearing the band Spike Jones and his City Slickers on Radio Luxembourg.

== Second World War ==
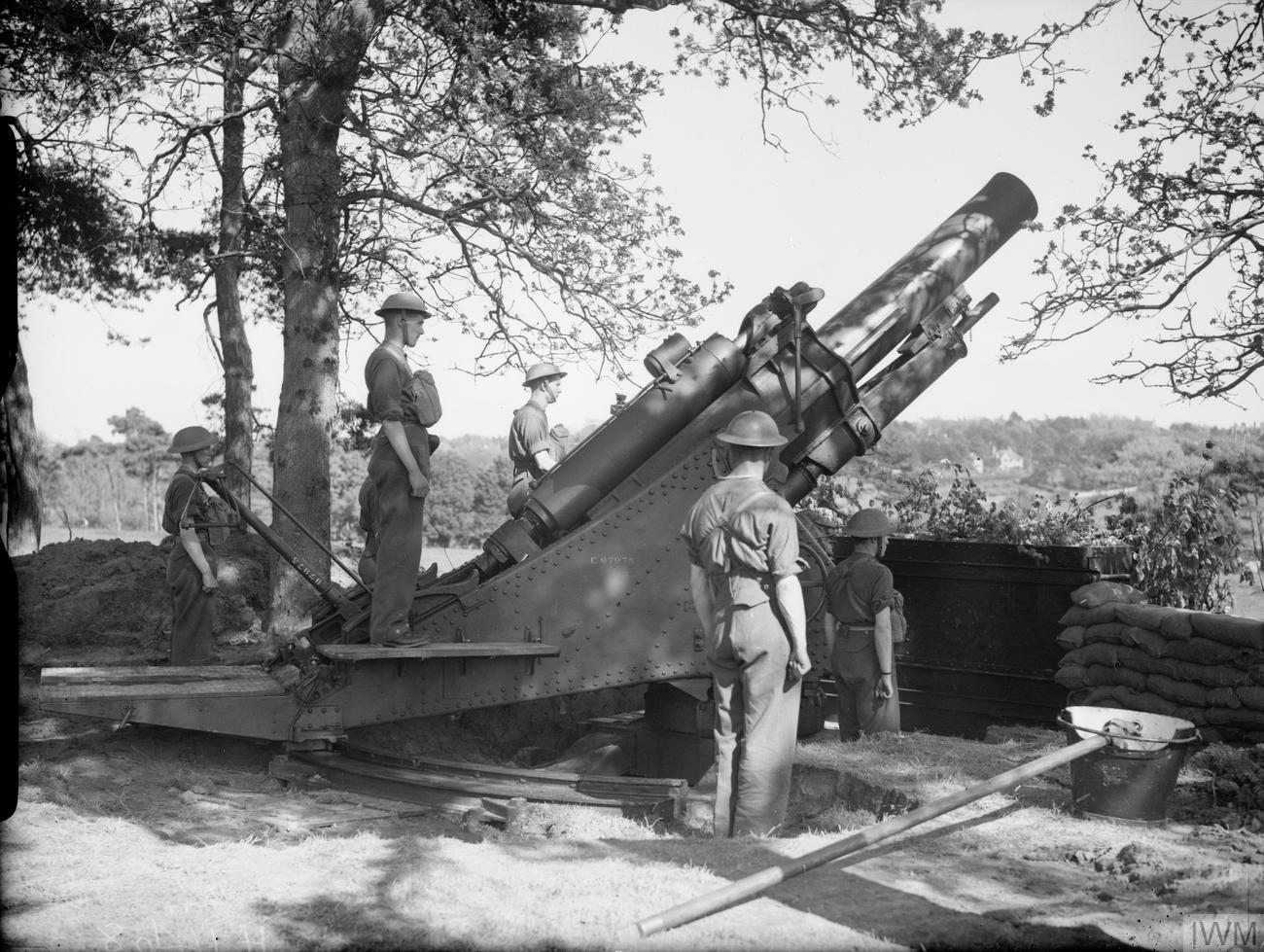
Men of Milligan's unit, 56th Heavy Regiment, with a BL 9.2-inch howitzer, Hastings, Sussex, May 1940

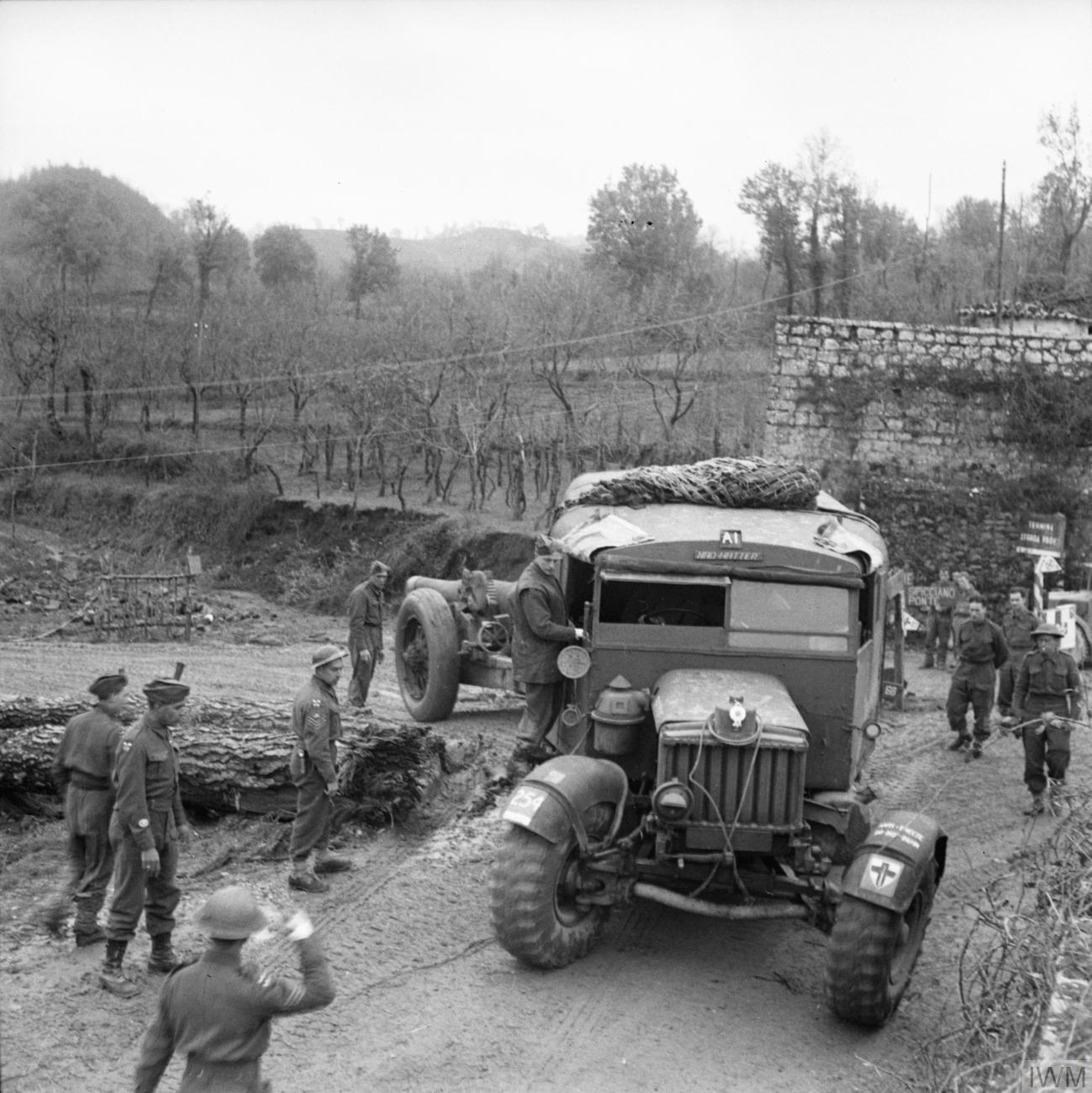
A Scammell Pioneer tows a howitzer of 18 Battery, 56th Heavy Regiment in Italy, 23 December 1943.

During most of the late 1930s and early 1940s, Milligan performed as an amateur jazz vocalist, guitarist, and trumpeter before, during and after being called up for military service in the fight against Nazi Germany, but even then he wrote and performed comedy sketches as part of concerts to entertain troops. After his call-up, but before being sent abroad, he and fellow musician Harry Edgington (whose nickname "Edge-ying-Tong" inspired one of Milligan's most memorable musical creations, the "Ying Tong Song") composed surreal stories, filled with puns and skewed logic, as a way of staving off the boredom of life in barracks. A biographer describes his early dance band work: "He managed to croon like Bing Crosby and win a competition: he also played drums, guitar and trumpet, in which he was entirely self taught." Milligan acquired a double bass, on which he took lessons and would pluck in jazz sessions. He had perfect pitch.

During the Second World War, Milligan served as a signaller in D Battery (later 19 Battery), 56th Heavy Regiment, Royal Artillery, as Gunner Milligan, 954024. The unit was equipped with the obsolete First World War era BL 9.2-inch howitzer and based in Bexhill on the south coast of England. Milligan describes training with these guns in part two of Adolf Hitler: My Part in His Downfall, claiming that, during training, gun crews resorted to shouting "bang" in unison as they had no shells with which to practise.

Milligan's unit – now equipped with four BL 7.2-inch howitzers – saw action as part of the First Army in the North African campaign (during which Milligan was appointed lance bombardier) and then in the succeeding Italian campaign. In Italy, Milligan was about to be promoted to bombardier, when he was wounded in action at the Battle of Monte Cassino. Subsequently, hospitalised for a mortar wound to the right leg and shell shock, he was demoted back to gunner by an unsympathetic commanding officer (identified in his war diaries as Major Evan "Jumbo" Jenkins).

After hospitalisation, Milligan drifted through various rear-echelon military jobs in Italy, eventually joining the Central Pool of Artists (a group he described as composed "of bomb-happy squaddies") and becoming a full-time entertainer. He played the guitar with a jazz and comedy group called The Bill Hall Trio in concert parties for the troops. In May 1945, shortly after VE Day, Milligan was promoted to full Bombardier in recognition of his work in entertaining the troops.After being demobilised, Milligan remained in Italy playing with the trio but returned to Britain soon after. While he was with the CPA he began to write parodies of their mainstream plays, which displayed many of the key elements of what would later become The Goon Show (originally called Crazy People) with Peter Sellers, Harry Secombe and Michael Bentine.

== Career ==
=== The Goon Show ===
Milligan returned to jazz in the late 1940s and made a precarious living with the Hall trio and other musical comedy acts. He was also trying to break into the world of radio, as a performer or script writer. His first success in radio was as writer for comedian Derek Roy's show. After a delayed start, Milligan, Peter Sellers, Harry Secombe and Michael Bentine joined forces in a comedy project, The Goon Show. During its first season the BBC titled the show as Crazy People, or in full, The Junior Crazy Gang featuring those Crazy People, the Goons, to make the programme palatable to BBC officials, by connecting it with the popular group of theatre comedians known as The Crazy Gang.

The first episode was broadcast on 28 May 1951 on the BBC Home Service. Milligan did not perform as much in the early shows, but eventually became a lead performer in almost all of the Goon Show episodes, portraying a wide range of characters including Eccles, Minnie Bannister, Jim Spriggs and the nefarious Count Moriarty. He was also the primary author of most of the scripts, although he co-wrote many scripts with collaborators, most notably Larry Stephens and Eric Sykes. Most of the early shows were co-written with Stephens (and edited by Jimmy Grafton) but this partnership faltered after Series 3. Milligan wrote most of Series 4 but collaborated with Eric Sykes from Series 5 (coinciding with the birth of the Milligans' second child, Seán) and through most of Series 6, a development that grew out of his business collaboration with Sykes in Associated London Scripts. Milligan and Stephens reunited during Series 6 but towards the end of Series 8 Stephens was sidelined by health problems and Milligan worked briefly with John Antrobus. The Milligan-Stephens partnership was finally ended by Stephens' death from a brain haemorrhage in January 1959; Milligan later downplayed and disparaged Stephens' contributions.

The Goon Show was recorded before a studio audience and during the audience warm-up session, Milligan would play the trumpet, while Peter Sellers played on the orchestra's drums. For the first few years the shows were recorded live, direct to 16-inch transcription disc, which required the cast to adhere closely to the script, but by Series 4, the BBC had adopted the use of magnetic tape. Milligan eagerly exploited the possibilities the new technology offered: the tapes could be edited, so the cast could now ad-lib freely, and tape also enabled the creation of groundbreaking sound effects. Over the first three series, Milligan's demands for increasingly complex sound effects (or "grams", as they were then known) pushed technology and the skills of the BBC engineers to their limits—effects had to be created mechanically (through foley) or played back from discs, sometimes requiring the use of four or five turntables simultaneously. With magnetic tape, these effects could be produced in advance and the BBC engineers were able to create highly complex, tightly edited effects "stings" that would have been difficult using Foley or disc. In the later years of the series many Goon Show "grams" were produced by members of the BBC Radiophonic Workshop, an example being the "Major Bloodnok's Stomach" effect, realised by Dick Mills.

Although the Goons elevated Milligan to national stardom, the demands of writing and performing the series took a heavy toll. During Series 3 he had the first of several serious mental breakdowns, which also marked the onset of a decades-long cycle of bipolar disorder. In late 1952, possibly exacerbated by suppressed tensions between the Goons' stars, Milligan apparently became irrationally convinced that he had to kill Sellers. When he attempted to gain entry to Sellers's neighbouring flat, armed with a potato knife, he accidentally walked straight through the plate-glass front door. He was hospitalised, heavily sedated for two weeks, and spent almost two months recuperating; fortunately for the show, a backlog of scripts meant that his illness had little effect on production. Milligan later blamed the pressure of writing and performing The Goon Show for his breakdown and the failure of his first marriage.

=== Television ===
Milligan during his prime years

Milligan made several forays into television as a writer-performer, in addition to his many guest appearances on interview, variety and sketch comedy series from the 1950s to the 2000s. The Idiot Weekly, Price 2d (1956), starring Peter Sellers, was the first attempt to translate Goons humour to TV; it was followed by A Show Called Fred and Son of Fred, both made during 1956 and directed by Richard Lester, who went on to direct The Beatles in A Hard Day's Night . During a visit to Australia in 1958, a similar special was made for the Australian Broadcasting Commission, "The Gladys Half-Hour", which also featured local actors Ray Barrett and John Bluthal, who would appear in several later Milligan projects. In 1961, Milligan co-wrote two episodes of the popular sitcom Sykes and a..., co-starring Sykes and Hattie Jacques and the one-off "Spike Milligan Offers a Series of Unrelated Incidents at Current Market Value".

The 15-minute series The Telegoons (1963), was the next attempt to transplant the Goons to television, this time using puppet versions of the familiar characters. The initial intention was to "visualise" original recordings of 1950s Goon Show episodes but this proved difficult, because of the rapid-fire dialogue and was ultimately frustrated by the BBC's refusal to allow the original audio to be used. Fifteen-minute adaptations of the original scripts by Maurice Wiltshire were used instead, with Milligan, Sellers and Secombe reuniting to provide the voices; according to a contemporary press report, they received the highest fees the BBC had ever paid for 15-minute shows. Two series were made in 1963 and 1964 and (presumably because it was shot on 35 mm film rather than video) the series has reportedly been preserved in the BBC archives.

Milligan's next major TV venture was the sketch comedy series The World of Beachcomber (1968), made in colour for BBC 2; it is believed all 19 episodes are lost. In the same year, the three Goons reunited for a televised re-staging of a vintage Goon Show for Thames Television, with John Cleese substituting for the late Wallace Greenslade.

In early 1969, Milligan starred in brownface in the situation comedy Curry and Chips, created and written by Johnny Speight and featuring Milligan's old friend and colleague Eric Sykes. Curry and Chips set out to satirise racist attitudes in Britain in a similar vein to Speight's earlier creation, the hugely successful Till Death Us Do Part, with Milligan "browning up" to play Kevin O'Grady, a half-Pakistani–half-Irish factory worker. Milligan was also involved in the programme The Melting Pot.

Director John Goldschmidt's film The Other Spike dramatised Milligan's nervous breakdown in a film for Granada Television, for which Milligan wrote the screenplay and in which he played himself. Later that year, he was commissioned by the BBC to write and star in Q5, the first in the innovative Q... TV series, acknowledged as an important forerunner to Monty Python's Flying Circus, which premiered several months later. There was a hiatus of several years, before the BBC commissioned Q6 in 1975. Q7 appeared in 1977, Q8 in 1978, Q9 in 1980 and There's a Lot of It About in 1982. Milligan's daughter, Laura, conceived and co-wrote an animated series called The Ratties (1987). Milligan narrated the 26 five-minute episodes. He later voiced the animated series Wolves, Witches and Giants, which aired on ITV from 1995 to 1998.

=== Poetry and other writings ===
Milligan wrote verse, considered to be within the genre of literary nonsense. For example: "It's due to pigeons that alight; on Nelson's hat that makes it white." His poetry has been described by comedian Stephen Fry as "absolutely immortal — greatly in the tradition of Lear." One of his poems, "On the Ning Nang Nong", was voted the UK's favourite comic poem in 1998 in a nationwide poll, ahead of other nonsense poets including Lewis Carroll and Edward Lear. This nonsense verse, set to music, became a favourite in Australia, performed week after week by the ABC children's programme Play School. Milligan included it on his album No One's Gonna Change Our World in 1969, to aid the World Wildlife Fund. In December 2007 it was reported that, according to OFSTED, it is among the ten most commonly taught poems in primary schools in Britain.

While depressed, he wrote serious poetry, much of which is compiled in Open Heart University. He also wrote a novel Puckoon and a series of war memoirs, including Adolf Hitler: My Part in His Downfall (1971), "Rommel?" "Gunner Who?": A Confrontation in the Desert (1974), Monty: His Part in My Victory (1976) and Mussolini: His Part in My Downfall (1978). Milligan's seven volumes of memoirs cover the years from 1939 to 1950 (his call-up, war service, first breakdown, time spent entertaining in Italy and return to Britain).

Milligan also wrote comedy songs, including "Purple Aeroplane", which was a parody of the Beatles' song "Yellow Submarine". He wrote the lyric to saxophonist/composer Duncan Lamont's "English Folk Song", heard on jazz singer Tina May's 2021 album, 52nd Street (and Other Tales). He was the narrator for Lamont's Sherlock Holmes Suite, commissioned by the City of London to commemorate the first appearance of Sherlock Holmes in The Strand magazine.

=== Theatre ===
==== Treasure Island ====
Bernard Miles gave Milligan his first straight acting role, as Ben Gunn, in the Mermaid Theatre production of Treasure Island. Miles described Milligan as,

... a man of quite extraordinary talents ... a visionary who is out there alone, denied the usual contacts simply because he is so different he can't always communicate with his own species.

Treasure Island played twice daily through the winter of 1961–1962 and was an annual production at the Mermaid Theatre for some years. In the 1968 production, Barry Humphries played the role of Long John Silver, with Willie Rushton as Squire Trelawney and Milligan as Ben Gunn. To Humphries, Milligan's "best performance must surely have been as Ben Gunn ..., Milligan stole the show every night, in a makeup which took at least an hour to apply. His appearance on stage always brought a roar of delight from the kids in the audience and Spike had soon left the text far behind as he went off into a riff of sublime absurdity".

==== The Bedsitting Room ====
In 1961–1962, during the long pauses between the matinee and the evening show of Treasure Island, Milligan began talking to Miles about the idea he and John Antrobus were exploring, of a dramatised post-nuclear world. This became the one-act play The Bedsitting Room, which Milligan co-wrote with John Antrobus and which premiered at the Marlowe Theatre, Canterbury on 12 February 1962. It was adapted to a longer play and staged by Miles at London's Mermaid Theatre, making its debut on 31 January 1963. It was a critical and commercial success and was revived in 1967 with a provincial tour before opening at London's Saville Theatre on 3 May 1967. Richard Lester later directed the film, released in 1969.

==== Oblomov ====
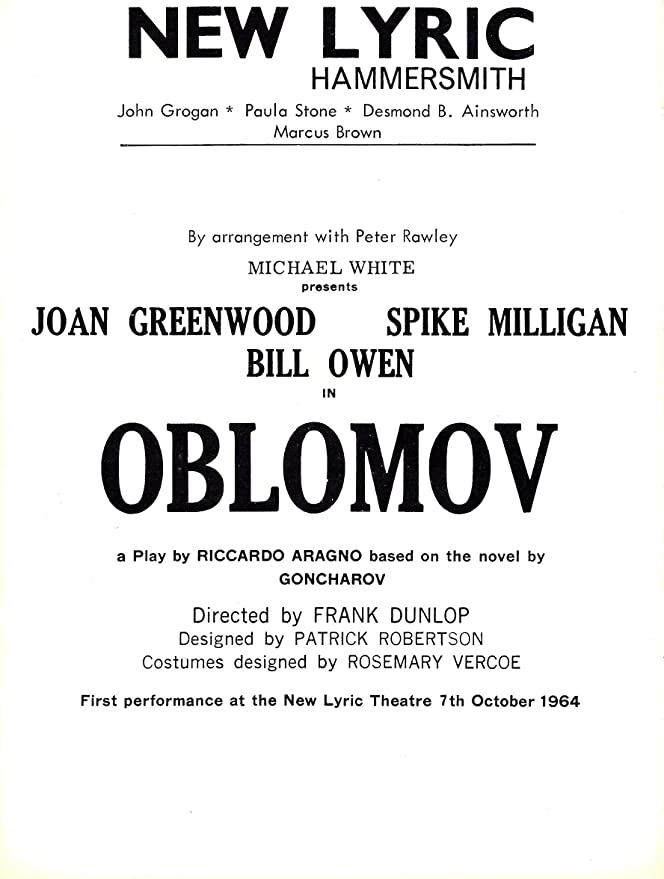
Title page of the program to Oblomov, before its name change and move to the Comedy Theatre

Tiring of comedic roles, Milligan sought out more serious material. He had read Ivan Goncharov's Oblomov and felt a kinship with the title character, who declines to leave his bed to face the world. According to Scudamore's biography:

Milligan's fans and the theatrical world in general found it hard to believe that he was to appear in a straight play ... He refused to be serious when questioned about his motives. In the story, Oblomov decides to spend his life in bed. Spike decided to identify with his character, and told disbelieving reporters that he thought it would be a nice comfortable rest for him. This was of course, prevarication. Spike was actually intrigued with Oblomov and had read a translation of Ivan Goncharov's novel.

The novel had been adapted for the stage by Italian writer Riccardo Aragno. Aragno's script for Oblomov was bought by Milligan's production company in early 1964. Milligan had long nurtured hopes of moving from comedy to serious drama. Milligan rehearsed for seven weeks with director Frank Dunlop and the cast members Joan Greenwood, Bill Owen, and Valentine Dyall at the Lyric Hammersmith.

The first preview was on 6 October 1964. During this performance Milligan was struck by stage fright and forgot nearly all of his lines. He quickly began making up things to say to the cast, turning the drama into an impromptu improv session. Noticing that a drama critic who'd given rave reviews to Milligan's other stage comedies was in the audience, Milligan ended the first performance by shouting "Thank God, Milton Shulman's in!"

The play was savaged in the theatrical press but Oblomov's producers had booked the play into the Lyric for three weeks. Anxious to recoup their investment by any means, they gave Milligan carte-blanche on stage. Milligan's antics included starting the play while sitting with the audience, yelling for the cast to entertain him. Another night he wore a false arm that fell out of his sleeve when co-star Ian Flintoff, playing Oblomov's doctor, shook Milligan's hand. When Flintoff complained to Bill Kerr, a friend of Milligan, that he was making a mockery of their hard work Kerr replied: "We have to put up with all the shit, mate, because it pays the rent."

Joan Greenwood, who played Olga, later recalled that her husband André Morell thought the first performance was so appalling that they should get Greenwood out of her contract. According to Scudamore,

Nobody seemed at all comfortable in their roles and the audience began to hoot with laughter when Milligan's slipper inadvertently went spinning across the stage into the stalls. That was the end of Spike's playing straight. The audience demanded a clown, he became a clown. When he forgot his words, or disapproved of them, he simply made up what he felt to be more appropriate ones. That night there were no riotous first night celebrations and most of the cast seemed to go home stunned. The following night Milligan began to ad lib in earnest. The text of the show began to change drastically. The cast were bedevilled and shaken but they went along with him ... Incredibly, the show began to resolve itself. The context changed completely. It was turned upside down and inside out. Cues and lines became irrelevant as Milligan verbally rewrote the play each night. By the end of the week, Oblomov had changed beyond recognition. Andre Morell came again ... and afterwards said 'the man is a genius. He must be a genius—it's the only word for him. He's impossible—but he's a genius!'.

The play continued to run as an improv comedy. The decision soon caused it to break all box office records at the Lyric. After five weeks it was renamed Son of Oblomov and moved on 2 December 1964 to the Comedy Theatre in the West End. It ran there for 559 performances. As the play was substantially new each night it drew record numbers of repeat traffic.

On 22 April 1965, Queen Elizabeth and her family attended as part of her 39th birthday celebration. Just after the curtain rose, a group of four latecomers attempted to slink to their seats directly in front of the royal family. Milligan immediately shouted: "Turn up the house lights! Start everything again!" He pointed to the blushing foursome and cried, "That's cost you your knighthood!"

Then, noticing that Peter Sellers was seated between Prince Charles and Princess Margaret, Milligan asked in a loud voice: "Is there a Sellers in the house?" Sellers immediately shouted, "Yes!" Milligan launched into a vaudeville routine about Prince Philip's suspenders, with Sellers participating from his seat with the royals. This culminated in Milligan giving a high-kick, lobbing one of his bedroom slippers at Sellers, only just missing Prince Philip's head. Once back in bed with co-star Joan Greenwood, Milligan spent the rest of the performance poking fun at the Queen for bringing her son to such a racy play. The play ended with Milligan unsheathing a katana on stage and asking the Queen to knight him for his efforts that night; she declined. The performance ran 45 minutes over its scheduled ending. Prince Charles reportedly saw the play five times.

In a 1988 interview with Bernard Braden, Milligan described theatre as being important to him,

First it was a means of livelihood. And I had sort of lagged behind my confederates, that I ... remained in the writing seat. And I realise that basically I was quite a good clown ... and the one and only chance I ever had to prove that was in Oblomov when I clowned my way out of what was a very bad script ... I clowned it into a West End success and uh, we kept changing it all the time. It was a tour de force of improvisation ... all that ended it was I got fed up with it, that's all."

=== Ken Russell films ===
In 1959 Ken Russell made a short 35 mm film about and with Milligan entitled Portrait of a Goon. The making of the film is detailed in Paul Sutton's 2012 authorised biography Becoming Ken Russell. In 1971 Milligan played a humble village priest in Russell's film The Devils. The scene was cut from the release print and is considered lost but photographs from the scene, together with Murray Melvin's memory of that day's filming, are included in Sutton's 2014 book Six English Filmmakers.

=== Ad-libbing ===
As illustrated in the description of his involvement in theatre, Milligan often ad-libbed. One of Milligan's ad-lib incidents occurred during a visit to Australia in the late 1960s. He was interviewed live on air and remained in the studio for the news broadcast that followed, during which Milligan constantly interjected, adding his own name to news items. As a result, he was banned from making any further live appearances on the ABC. The ABC also changed its national policy so that guests had to leave the studio after interviews were complete. A tape of the bulletin survives and has been included in an ABC Radio audio compilation, and also on the BBC tribute CD, Vivat Milligna.

Film and television director Richard Lester recalls that the television series A Show Called Fred was broadcast live. "I've seen very few moments of genius in my life but I witnessed one with Spike after the first show. He had brought around a silent cartoon" and asked Lester if his P.A. took shorthand. "She said she did. 'Good, this needs a commentary.' It was a ten-minute cartoon and Spike could have seen it only once, if that. He ad-libbed the commentary for it and it was perfect. I was open-mouthed at the raw comedy creation in front of me."

=== Cartoons and art ===
Milligan contributed occasional cartoons to the satirical magazine Private Eye. Most were visualisations of one-line jokes. For example, a young boy sees the Concorde and asks his father "What's that?". The reply is "That's a flying groundnut scheme, son." Milligan was a keen painter.

=== Advertising ===
In 1967, applying a satirical angle to a fashion for the inclusion of Superman-inspired characters in British television commercials, Milligan dressed up in a "Bat-Goons" outfit, to appear in a series of television commercials for BP. A contemporary reporter found the TV commercials "funny and effective". Milligan appeared with Peter Sellers in an advert for Benson & Hedges in 1973. Milligan requested that his fee was paid to ASH: Action on Smoking and Health. When this was refused, he gave the money to charity instead. The advert was popular with the public and also won several industry awards. From 1980 to 1982, he advertised for the English Tourist Board, playing a Scotsman on a visit around the different regions of England. Other advertising appearances included television commercials for Kellogg's Corn Flakes, the Leyland Mini, Commonwealth Bank of Australia, and Planters nuts.

=== Other contributions ===
In the 1970s, Charles Allen compiled a series of stories from British people's experiences of life in the British Raj, called Plain Tales from the Raj and published in 1975. Milligan was the youngest contributor, describing his life in India when it was under British rule. In it he mentions the imperial parades there,

The most exciting sound for me was the sound of the Irregular Punjabi Regiment playing the dhol and surmai [a type of drum]—one beat was dum-da-da-dum, dum-da-da-dum, dum-da-da-dum! They wore these great long pantaloons, a gold dome to their turbans, khaki shirts with banded waistcoats, double-cross bandoliers, leather sandals, and they used to march very fast, I remember, bursting in through the dust on the heels of an English regiment. They used to come in with trailed arms and they'd throw their rifles up into the air, catch it with their left hand—always to this dum-da-da-dum, dum-da-da-dum—and then stamp their feet and fire one round, synchronising with the drums. They'd go left, right, left, right, shabash! Hai! Bang! Dum-da-da-dum—it was sensational!

. One of his last screen appearances was in the BBC dramatisation of Mervyn Peake's Gormenghast.

=== Music composition ===
In 1988, while visiting his mother in Woy Woy (on the shores of Brisbane Water), Milligan composed and orchestrated a Grand Waltz for Brisbane Water and gave it to the symphony orchestra of nearby Gosford. Symphony Central Coast has performed it occasionally since, including a 2020 YouTube video as a COVID-19 isolation project.

== Personal life ==
=== Family ===
Milligan married his first wife, June Marlowe (originally Marchini), in 1952; Peter Sellers was best man. They had three children, Laura, Seán and Síle, and divorced in 1960.

He married Patricia Ridgway in June 1962, with George Martin as best man and the marriage produced one child, Jane Milligan. The marriage ended with Patricia's death from breast cancer in 1978.He reportedly had two children by other mothers.

His third wife was Shelagh Sinclair, to whom he was married from 1983 until his death on 27 February 2002. Shelagh, who was 25 years younger than Milligan, died in June 2011. Upon marrying Shelagh, Milligan made a new will which left his entire estate to his wife. The children unsuccessfully attempted to overturn the will. A High Court judge ruled that Shelagh was entitled to his whole estate, and his children should receive only "what was surplus to requirements".

Four of his children collaborated with documentary makers on a multi-platform programme called I Told You I Was Ill: The Life and Legacy of Spike Milligan (2005).

In October 2008, an array of Milligan's personal effects was sold at auction by Shelagh, who was moving into a smaller home. These included his vast library of books and memorabilia and a grand piano salvaged from a demolition and apparently played every morning by Paul McCartney, a neighbour in Rye in East Sussex. His children were distressed by the sale.

=== Health ===
Milligan had bipolar disorder for most of his life, having many serious mental breakdowns, several lasting over a year. He spoke candidly about his condition and its effect on his life,

I have got so low that I have asked to be hospitalised and for deep narcosis (sleep). I cannot stand being awake. The pain is too much ... Something has happened to me, this vital spark has stopped burning—I go to a dinner table now and I don't say a word, just sit there like a dodo. Normally I am the centre of attention, keep the conversation going—so that is depressing in itself. It's like another person taking over, very strange. The most important thing I say is 'good evening' and then I go quiet.

=== Nationality ===
Milligan was born in the British Empire to an English mother, and felt that he was thus entitled to British citizenship, especially after having served in the British Army for six years. When British law related to Commonwealth-born residents (which had given him a secure place) changed, he applied for a British passport in 1960. The application was refused, partly because he would not swear an Oath of Allegiance. Through his Irish father, he avoided statelessness by becoming an Irish citizen in 1962 and remained so for the rest of his life; this status gave him almost the same rights as a British citizen.

=== Religion ===
Milligan was agnostic, saying that he "sometimes prayed in moments of desperation on the off chance that somebody might be listening, but he always felt that he was talking to a void". Milligan was raised Catholic and expressed the view that "someone raised a Catholic was always a Catholic", referring to himself as a Catholic throughout his life.

=== Legal troubles ===
In 1974, Milligan was arrested for shooting a trespasser with an air rifle. He defended himself in court and was given a conditional discharge.

== Humour with the Prince of Wales ==
Prince Charles (now Charles III) was a fan of Milligan. When Milligan received the Lifetime Achievement Award at the British Comedy Awards in 1994, the prince sent a congratulatory message to be read out on live television. Milligan interrupted the message to call the prince a "little grovelling bastard". He later faxed the prince, saying: "I suppose a knighthood is out of the question now?"

In reality, he and the prince were very close friends, and Milligan had already been made a Commander of the Order of the British Empire (CBE) in 1992 (honorary because of his Irish citizenship). He was made an honorary Knight Commander of the Order of the British Empire (KBE) in 2001.

On 23 July 1981, the Prince of Wales and Lady Diana Spencer were presented with a poem about the forthcoming Royal Wedding, delivered to Buckingham Palace on a 3-foot-9-inch parchment scroll, written under the pen name MacGoonical. A ridiculous verse written in the style of William McGonagall, the ode was commissioned by the Legal and General Assurance society as a "mark of esteem and affection". The verse, titled "Ode to His Royal Highness the Prince of Wales on the occasion of his Weeding", begins:

Oh! Twas in the year 1981
Prince Philip was reading Page 3 of The Sun!
They were all sitting in Buckingham Palace
Roaring with laughter at the comedy Dallas.

== Campaigning ==
He was a strident campaigner on environmental matters, particularly arguing against unnecessary noise, such as the use of "muzak".

In 1971, Milligan caused controversy by attacking an art exhibition at the Hayward Gallery with a hammer. The artwork included catfish, oysters, and shrimp that were to be electrocuted. He was a staunch and outspoken opponent of the scourge of domestic violence, dedicating one of his books to Erin Pizzey.

== Death ==
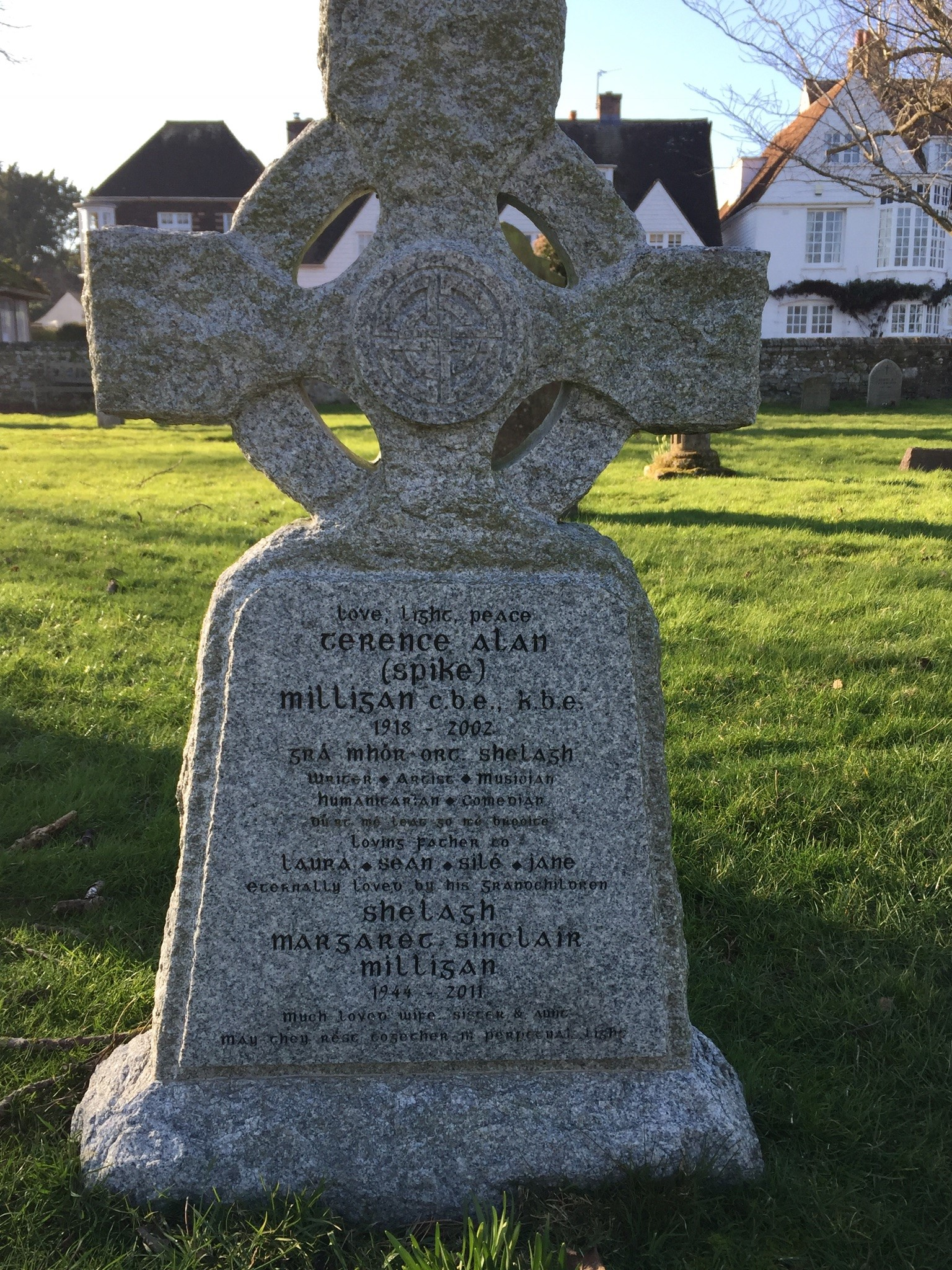
The headstone of Milligan's grave in the grounds of St Thomas' Winchelsea, East Sussex. The name of his last wife was added, along with birth and death dates and an additional epitaph. Milligan's epitaph includes the phrase Dúirt mé leat go mé breoite, Irish for "I told you I was ill". The headstone is positioned roughly midway between the New Inn and the church door.

Milligan retained his black humour into later life. In 1980, during the funeral of Peter Sellers, he quipped to Harry Secombe, "I hope you die before me, because I don't want you to sing at my funeral." (A recording of Secombe singing was played at Milligan's memorial service.) In 1990, he also wrote his own obituary, in which he stated repeatedly that he "wrote the Goon Show and died".

Milligan died from kidney failure, at the age of 83, on 27 February 2002, at his home on Dumb Woman's Lane near Rye, Sussex. On the day of his funeral, 8 March 2002, his coffin was carried to St Thomas Church in Winchelsea, East Sussex, and was draped in the flag of Ireland. He had once quipped that he wanted his headstone to bear the words: "I told you I was ill." He was buried at St Thomas' churchyard but the Chichester diocese refused to allow this epitaph. A compromise was reached with the Gaelic translation of "I told you I was ill", Dúirt mé leat go mé breoite,(technically a mistranslation; it should read "Dúirt mé leat go raibh mé breoite") and in English, "Love, light, peace". The additional epitaph Grá mhór ort Shelagh can be read as "Great love for you Shelagh".

According to a letter published in the Rye and Battle Observer in 2011, Milligan's headstone was removed from St Thomas' churchyard in Winchelsea and moved to be alongside the grave of his wife, but was later returned.

== Legacy ==
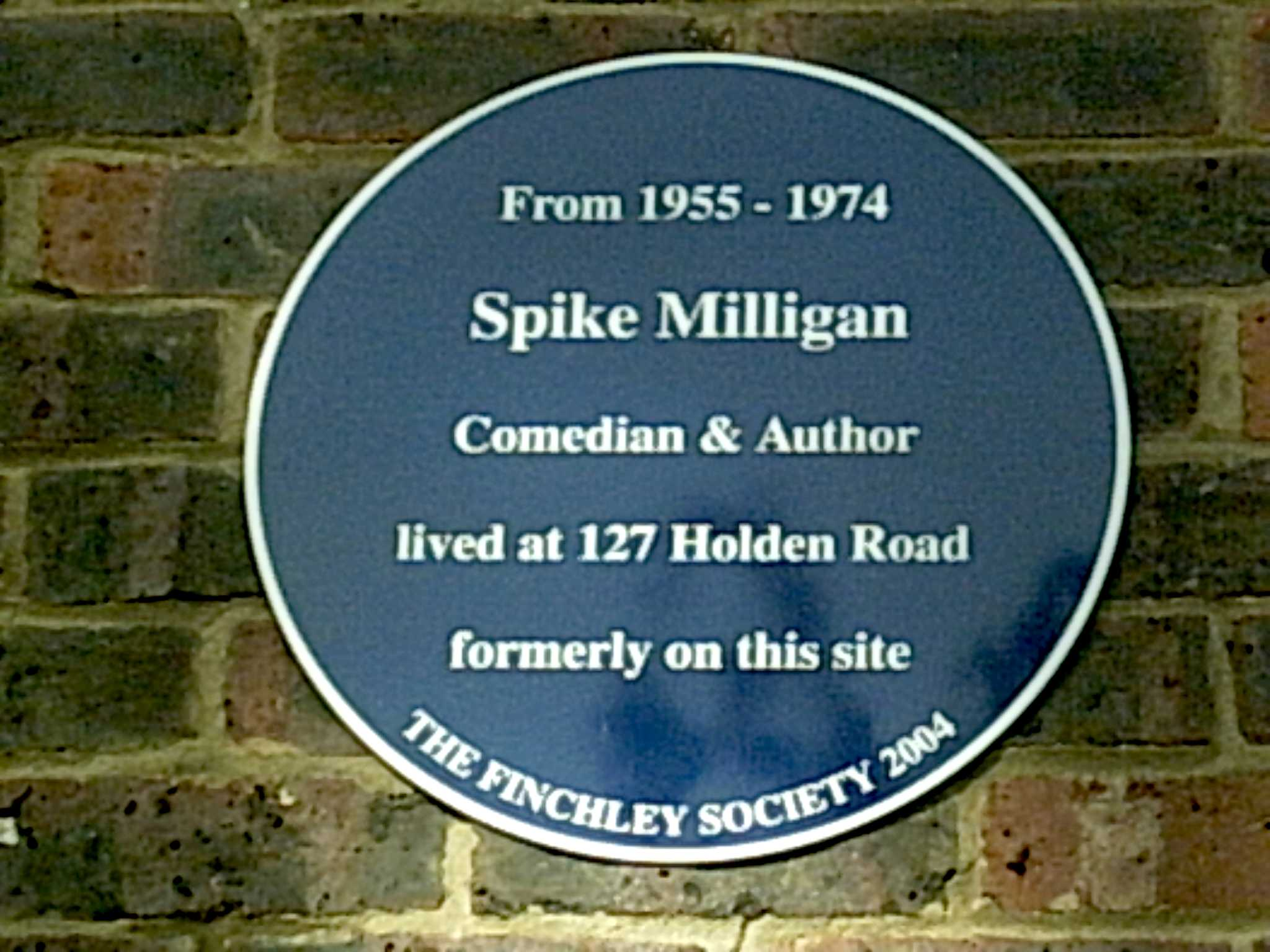
The Holden Road plaque

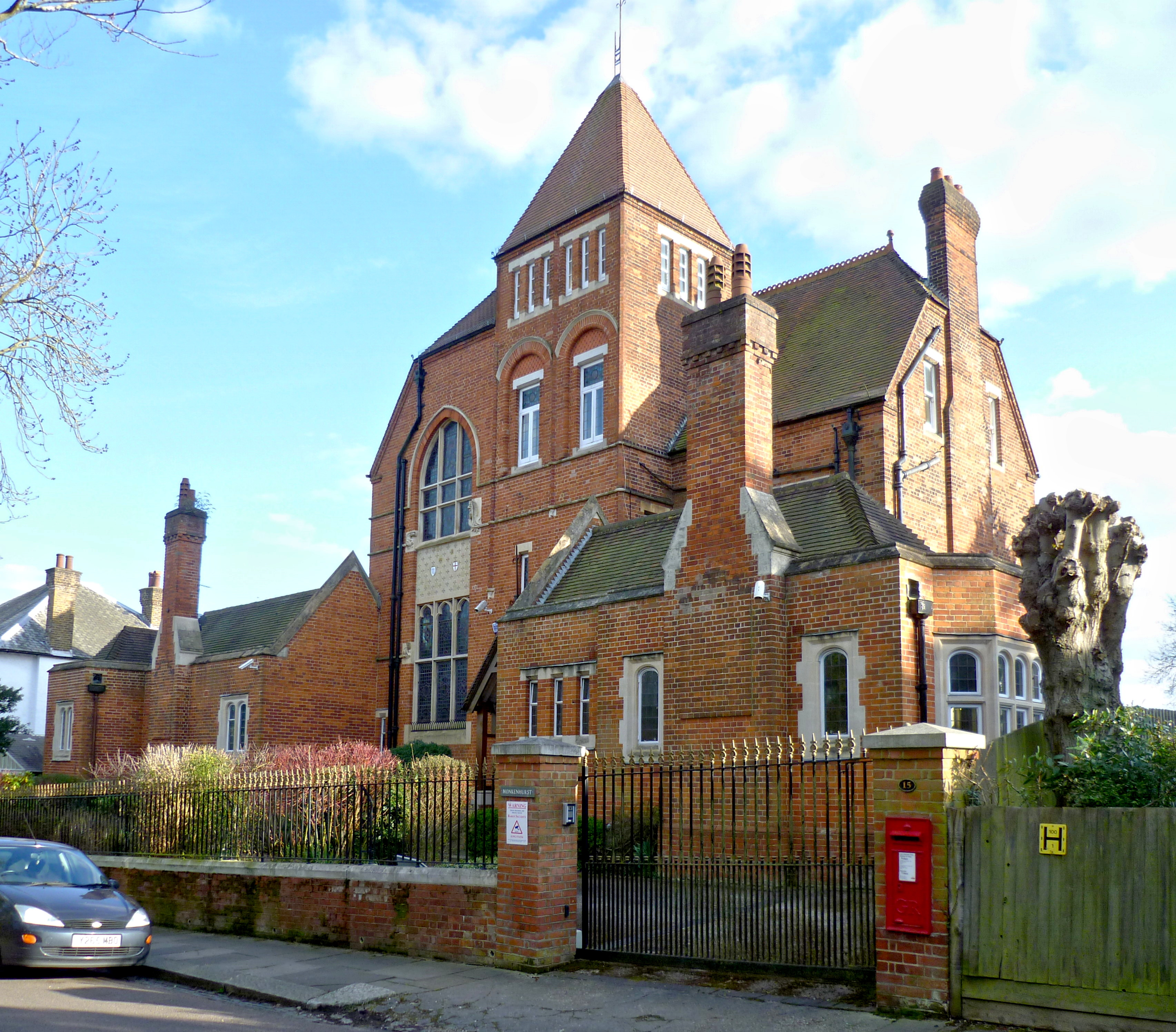
Monkenhurst, Hadley, where Milligan lived from 1974

From the 1960s, Milligan was a regular correspondent with Robert Graves. Milligan's letters to Graves usually addressed a question to do with classical studies. The letters form part of Graves's bequest to St John's College, Oxford.

The film of Puckoon, starring Sean Hughes, including Milligan's daughter, actress Jane Milligan, was released after his death.

Milligan lived for several years in Holden Road, Woodside Park, Finchley, north London, and at The Crescent, Barnet, and was a contributing founder and strong supporter of the Finchley Society. His house in Woodside Park has since been demolished but there is a blue plaque in his memory on the block of flats now on the site.

A memorial bench featuring a bronze likeness of Milligan sits near his former home in Finchley. Over ten years the Finchley Society, led by friend and local resident Barbara Warren, raised funds—the Spike Milligan Statue Fund—to commission a bench and statue of him by local sculptor John Somerville and erected in the grounds of Avenue House at Stephens House and Gardens in East End Road, Finchley. The memorial was unveiled on 4 September 2014 at a ceremony attended by local dignitaries and showbusiness celebrities including Roy Hudd, Michael Parkinson, Maureen Lipman, Terry Gilliam, Kathy Lette, Denis Norden and Lynsey de Paul.

There is a campaign to erect a statue in the London Borough of Lewisham where he grew up. After coming to England from India in the 1930s, he lived at 50 Riseldine Road, Brockley and attended Brownhill Boys' School (later Catford Boys' School, which was demolished in 1994). There is a plaque and bench at the Wadestown Library, Wellington, New Zealand, in an area called "Spike Milligan Corner".

In a 2005 poll to find the "Comedians' Comedian", he was voted among the top 50 comedy acts, by fellow comedians and comedy insiders. In a BBC poll in August 1999, Milligan was voted the "funniest person of the last 1,000 years".

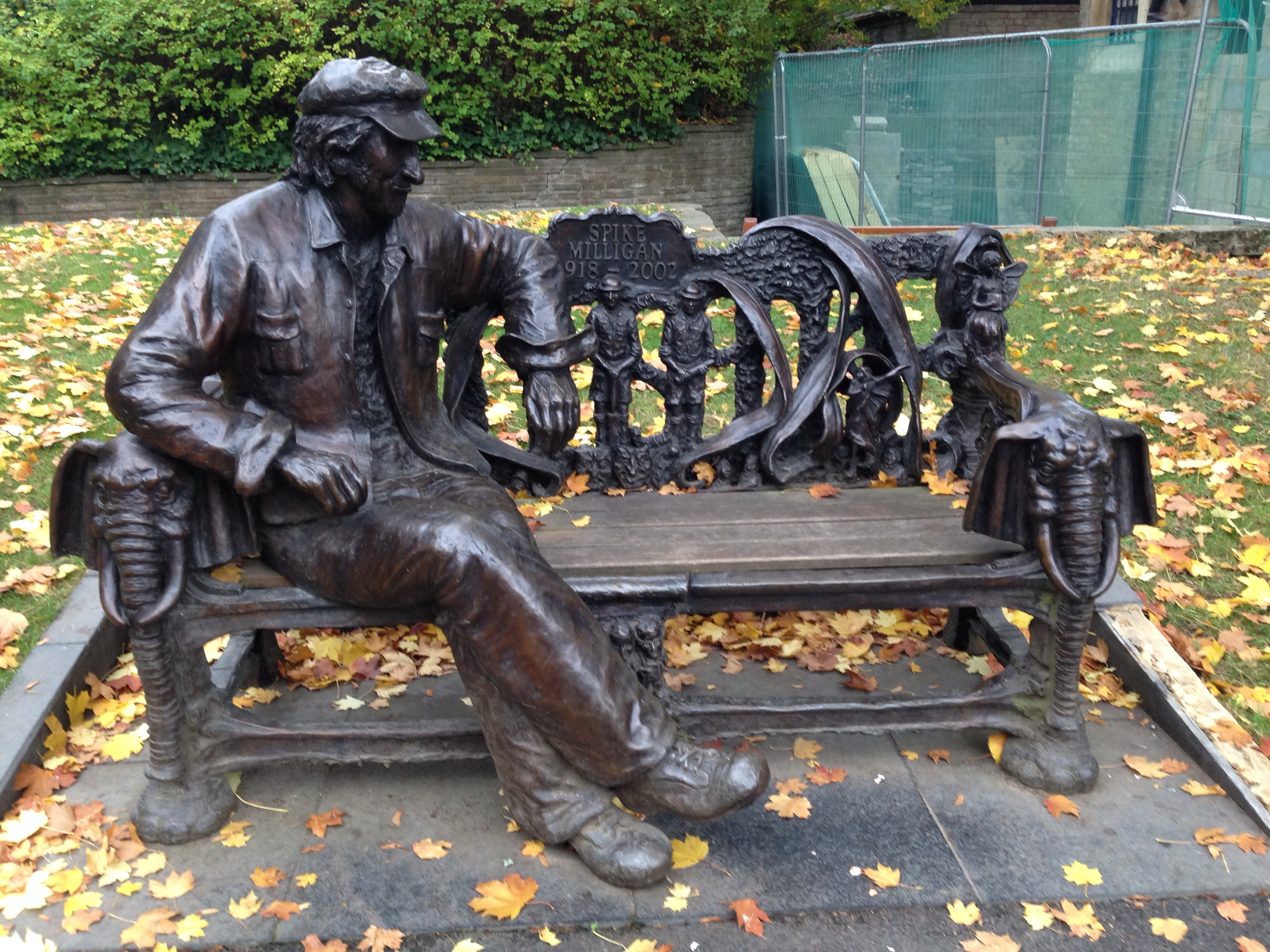
The Spike Milligan memorial bench in the grounds of Avenue House in Finchley

In the feature film adaptation of his memoir Adolf Hitler: My Part in His Downfall, Milligan was played by Jim Dale, while Milligan played his father. He was portrayed by Edward Tudor-Pole in The Life and Death of Peter Sellers (2004). In a 2008 stage play, Surviving Spike, Milligan was played by Michael Barrymore.

On 9 June 2006, it was reported that Richard Wiseman had identified Milligan as the writer of the world's funniest joke as decided by the Laughlab project. Wiseman said the joke contained all three elements of what makes a good gag, anxiety, a feeling of superiority and an element of surprise.

Eddie Izzard described Milligan as "The Godfather of Alternative Comedy". "From his unchained mind came forth ideas that just had no boundaries. And he influenced a new generation of comedians who came to be known as 'alternative'."

Members of Monty Python greatly admired him. In one interview, which was widely quoted at the time, John Cleese stated "Milligan is the Great God to all of us". The Pythons gave Milligan a cameo role in their 1979 film Monty Python's Life of Brian, when Milligan happened to be holidaying in Tunisia, near where the film was being shot; he was re-visiting where he had been stationed during the war. Graham Chapman gave him a minor part in Yellowbeard.

After their retirement, Milligan's parents and his younger brother Desmond moved to Australia. His mother lived the rest of her long life in the coastal town of Woy Woy on the New South Wales Central Coast, just north of Sydney. Spike became a regular visitor to Australia and made radio and TV programmes there, including The Idiot Weekly with Bobby Limb. He also wrote several books including Puckoon during a visit to his mother's house in Woy Woy. Milligan named the town "the largest above-ground cemetery in the world" when visiting in the 1960s.

Milligan's mother became an Australian citizen in 1985, partly in protest at the circumstances which led to her son's ineligibility for British citizenship; Milligan was reportedly considering applying for Australian citizenship at the time. The suspension bridge on the cyclepath from Woy Woy to Gosford was renamed the Spike Milligan Bridge in his memory, and a meeting room in the Woy Woy Public Library is also named after him.

== Radio comedy shows ==
- The Goon Show (1951–60)
- The Idiot Weekly (1958–62)
- The Omar Khayyam Show (1963–64)
- The Last Goon Show of All (1972)
- Milligna (1972). The title is based on Milligan's introduction in The Last Goon Show of All as "Spike Milligna, the well-known typing error".
- The Milligan Papers (1987)
- Flywheel, Shyster, and Flywheel (1990)

== Other radio shows ==
Milligan contributed his recollections of his childhood in India for the acclaimed 1970s BBC audio history series Plain Tales From The Raj. The series was published in book form in 1975 by André Deutsch, edited by Charles Allen.

== Television comedy shows ==
- Don't Spare the Horses (1952)
- The Idiot Weekly, Price 2d (1956)
- A Show Called Fred (1956)
- Son of Fred (1956)
- Milligan's Wake (1964–1965)
- The World of Beachcomber (1968–1969)
- Curry and Chips (1969)
- The Q series: Q5 (1969), Q6 (1975), Q7 (1978), Q8 (1979), Q9 (1980), and There's a Lot of It About (1982)
- Oh In Colour (1970)

== Other notable television involvement ==
- Six-Five Special, first aired on 31 August 1957. Milligan plays an inventor, Mr. Pym, and acts as a butcher in a sketch.
- The Marty Feldman Comedy Machine, Milligan co-wrote and performed in some sketches.
- In December 1970 Milligan presented the documentary Follies of the Wise
- In 1975 Milligan co-wrote (with Neil Shand) and co-starred in a BBC TV sitcom called The Melting Pot. Its cast of characters included two illegal immigrants, an Irish landlord, a Chinese Cockney, a Scottish Arab and numerous other racial stereotypes; Milligan himself took the part of Mr Van Gogh, described as "an illegal Pakistani immigrant". After screening the pilot, the series was deemed to be too offensive for transmission. Five episodes remain unseen. Some of the characters and situations were reused in Milligan's novel The Looney.
- Tiswas – 1981 edition.
- Guest appearing along with Peter Cook in Kenny Everett's Christmas Show in 1985.
- Playing a moaning stranger in an episode from 1987 of In Sickness and in Health.
- Narrator of The Ratties (1987), a children's cartoon series written by Mike Wallis and Laura Milligan, Spike's daughter.
- The Phantom Raspberry Blower of Old London Town ran as a serial in The Two Ronnies in the 1970s.
- Special guest star of edition of 18 January 1979 of The Muppet Show.
- Guest star in the 3rd episode of the award-winning BBC Scotland drama series Takin' Over the Asylum (1994).
- Narrated the 1995 TV show Wolves, Witches and Giants. A cartoon based on the book of the same name, it retold classic tales such as Little Red Riding Hood and Cinderella, but with a twist. The programme won the 1995 Royal Television Society award for Best Children's Entertainment, and was nominated for the same award again in 1997.
- Guest on Series 4, Episode 3 of Room 101 in 1999.

== Theatre ==
- Treasure Island (1961, 1973–1975)
- The Bedsitting Room (1963, 1967), written by Milligan and John Antrobus
- Oblomov opened at the Lyric Theatre, Hammersmith, in 1964. It was based on the Russian classic by Ivan Goncharov, and gave Milligan the opportunity to play most of the title role in bed. Unsure of his material, on the opening night he improvised a great deal, treating the audience as part of the plot almost, and he continued in this manner for the rest of the run, and on tour as 'Son of Oblomov'. The show ran at the Comedy Theatre in London's West End in 1965.
- Badjelly's Bad Christmas was a play created and performed by the Chickenshed Theatre Company using the works of Milligan and his characters.

== Filmography ==
Year	Title	Role	Notes
1951	Penny Points to Paradise	Spike Donnelly	
1951	Let's Go Crazy	Eccles / Waiter	Short; Uncredited
1952	Down Among the Z Men	Eccles	
1953	The Super Secret Service		Co-writer, short
1954	Calling All Cars	Narrator	Short, with Cardew Robinson
1955	A Kid for Two Farthings	Indian with Grey Beard	Uncredited
1956	The Case of the Mukkinese Battle-Horn	Sgt. Brown / Eccles / Catchpole Burkington / Minnie Bannister (voices)	Short
1960	Watch Your Stern	Ranjid	
1960	Suspect	Arthur	
1960	The Running Jumping & Standing Still Film	Himself	Short
1961	Invasion Quartet	Godfrey Pringle	
1961	What a Whopper	Tramp	
1962	Postman's Knock	Harold Petts	
1966	Fish and Milligan	Fisherman	
1969	The Bed Sitting Room	Mate	
1969	The Magic Christian	Traffic Warden 27	
1969	Curry & Chips	Kevin O'Grady	Main Role; 6 Episodes
1969-1982	Q...	Various Roles	38 Episodes
1971	The Magnificent Seven Deadly Sins	Tramp	(segment "Sloth")
1971-1972	The Marty Feldman Comedy Machine	Various Roles	14 Episodes
1972	Rentadick	Customs Officer	
1972	The Adventures of Barry McKenzie	Landlord	
1972	Alice's Adventures in Wonderland	Gryphon	
1973	Adolf Hitler: My Part in His Downfall	Leo Milligan	
1973	Digby, the Biggest Dog in the World	Dr. Harz	
1973	The Three Musketeers	M. Bonacieux	
1973	Ghost in the Noonday Sun	Bill Bombay	
1974	The Cherry Picker	Mr. Lal	
1974	Man About the House	Himself	
1975	The Great McGonagall	William McGonagall	
1976	Barney	Hawker	Also known as Lost in the Wild
1976	The Melting Pot	Mr. Van Gogh	Main Role; 6 Episodes
1977	Fantastic Animation Festival	Narrator: "Moonshadow"	
1977	The Last Remake of Beau Geste	Crumble	
1977	Dot and the Kangaroo	Mr. Platypus (voice)	
1978	The Hound of the Baskervilles	Policeman	
1979	Monty Python's Life of Brian	Spike	
1980	Amazing Scenes	Narrator	Documentary film about Australian fringe theatre, featuring Circus Oz, Wimmins Circus, Reg Livermore, Los Trios Ringbarkus, and others
1981	History of the World, Part I	Monsieur Rimbaud	(The French Revolution)
1983	Yellowbeard	Flunkie	
1985	No 73		Episode: "Non Returnable"
1985	Super Gran	Zoo Keeper	Episode: "Supergran and the Missing Hissing"
1985	Kenny Everett's Christmas Carol	Ghost of Marley	Television film
1986	The Sooty Show		Episode: "Sootograms"
1987	In Sickness and in Health	Fancy Fred	1 episode
1988	Mr. H Is Late	Roadsweeper	Television short
1988	The Ratties	Narrator (voice)	
1989	The Mini Is 30	Himself	Television documentary
1993	The Big Freeze	Der Schauspieler	Television film
1993	The Great Bong	Unknown role (voice)	
1995–1998	Wolves, Witches and Giants	Narrator, Molly, The Giant, The Giant's Wife	10 episodes
1999	The Nearly Complete and Utter History of Everything	Lord Nelson	Television film
1999	The Comedy Trail: A Shaggy Dog Story	Himself	TV special
2000	Gormenghast	De'Ath	TV Mini-series
2000	Badjelly the Witch	Self, various characters	Television film
2000	The Unknown Peter Sellers	Himself	AMC television documentary

== Books ==
=== Goon Show ===
- The Goon Show Scripts (1972)
- More Goon Show Scripts (1973)
- The Book of the Goons (1974)
- The Goon Cartoons (1982) (illustrated by Peter Clarke)
- More Goon Cartoons (1983) (illustrated by Peter Clarke)
- The Lost Goon Shows (1987)

=== Novels ===
- Puckoon (1963)
- The Looney: An Irish Fantasy (1987)
- The Murphy (2000)

=== William McGonagall ===
- The Great McGonagall Scrapbook (1975) (with Jack Hobbs)
- William McGonagall: The Truth at Last (1976) (with Jack Hobbs)
- William McGonagall Meets George Gershwin: A Scottish Fantasy (1988) (with Jack Hobbs)
- William McGonagall: Freefall (1992) (with Jack Hobbs)

=== "According to" books ===
According to Spike Milligan is a series of literary pastiche novels. Each part of the series was a rewriting of an original novel, with surreal comic elements added.

- The Bible—the Old Testament According to Spike Milligan (1993)
- Lady Chatterley's Lover According to Spike Milligan (1994)
- Wuthering Heights According to Spike Milligan (1994)
- D. H. Lawrence's John Thomas and Lady Jane: According to Spike Milligan—Part II of "Lady Chatterley's Lover" (1995)
- Black Beauty According to Spike Milligan (1996)
- Frankenstein According to Spike Milligan (1997)
- Robin Hood According to Spike Milligan (1998)
- The Hound of the Baskervilles According to Spike Milligan (1998)
- Treasure Island According to Spike Milligan (2000)
- Classic Adventures: According to Spike Milligan (2002)

=== Scripts ===
- The Bed-Sitting Room (1970) (with John Antrobus)
- The Q Annual (1979)
- Get in the Q Annual (1980)
- There's a Lot of it About! (1983)
- The Melting Pot (1983)

=== Children's books ===
- Bald Twit Lion (1968)
- Badjelly the Witch (1973)
- Dip the Puppy (1974)
- Sir Nobonk and the Terrible Dreadful Awful Naughty Nasty Dragon (1982)
- A Children's Treasury of Milligan: Classic Stories and Poems (1999)
- The Magical World of Milligan (2009)
- Spike's Bike Book for Parents of Little Kids (Published by Traffic Authority NSW, 1985)
- Spike Milligan SPIKE'S BIKE BOOK FOR MEDIUM KIDS (Published by Traffic Authority NSW, 1985)
- Spike's Bike Book For Big Kids (Published by Traffic Authority NSW, 1985)

=== Memoirs ===
The War (and Peace) Memoirs. (The seven memoirs were also recorded as talking books with Milligan reciting them.)

- 1 Adolf Hitler: My Part in His Downfall (1971)
- 2 "Rommel?" "Gunner Who?" (1974)
- 3 Monty: His Part in My Victory (1976). This and the previous two books were released and publicised as the first, second and third part respectively of a trilogy.
- 4 Mussolini: His Part in My Downfall (1978). This was announced as the fourth part of his "increasingly misnamed" trilogy.
- 5 Where Have All the Bullets Gone? (1985)
- 6 Goodbye Soldier (1986)
- 7 Peace Work (1991)
- Milligan's War (1988) Compilation of the first six volumes of Milligan's war memoirs.
- It Ends with Magic: A Milligan Family History (1990)
- Spike Milligan: The Family Album: An Illustrated Autobiography (1999)
- Milligan's Meaning of Life: An Autobiography of Sorts (2011)

=== Non-fiction ===
- The Spike Milligan Letters (1977)
- More Spike Milligan Letters (1984)
- Dear Robert, Dear Spike: The Graves–Milligan Correspondence (1991) (with Robert Graves)
- Depression and How to Survive It (1993) (with Anthony Clare)

=== Collections of literature ===
- A Dustbin of Milligan (1961)
- The Little Pot Boiler: A Book Based Freely On His Seasonal Overdraft (1963)
- Book of Bits or a Bit of a Book (1965)
- Bedside Milligan (1969)
- Indefinite Articles and Scunthorpe (1981)
- A Potboiling Dustbin Full of Bits (1984)
- Scunthorpe Revisited: With Added Milligan Articles and Instant Relatives (1989)
- A Mad Medley of Milligan (1999)
- The Essential Spike Milligan (2002)
- The Compulsive Spike Milligan (2004)
- Box 18: The Unpublished Spike Milligan (2006)

=== Collections (mostly poetry) ===
- Silly Verse for Kids (1959)
- A Book of Milliganimals (1968)
- Values (poems) (1969)
- Milligan's Ark (1971)
- Small Dreams of a Scorpion (poems) (1972)
- Transports of Delight (1974)
- Milligan Book of Records (1975)
- Poems (1977)
- Goblins (poems) (1978)
- Open Heart University (poems) (1979)
- Twelve Poems That Made December Colder (1979)
- Unspun Socks from a Chicken's Laundry (poems) (1981)
- Chill Air (poems) (1981)
- One Hundred and One Best and Only Limericks of Spike Milligan (1982)
- Silly Verse for Kids and Animals (1984)
- Floored Masterpieces with Worse Verse (1985) (with Tracey Boyd)
- Further Transports of Delight (1985)
- The Mirror Running (poems) (1987)
- Startling Verse for All the Family (1987)
- That's Amazing (1988)
- Condensed Animals (1991)
- Hidden Words: Collected Poems (1993)
- Fleas, Knees and Hidden Elephants (poems) (1994)

== Recordings ==
Does not include Goon Show-related recordings

- Milligan Preserved (1961)
- Bridge on the River Wye (1962)
- Best of Milligan's Wake (1964)
- How to Win an Election (Or Not Lose By Much) (1964)
- Muses With Spike Milligan (1965)
- The World of Beachcomber (1968)
- A Record Load of Rubbish (1971)
- Badjelly The Witch (A Musical Tale) and Other Goodies (1974)
- He's Innocent of Watergate (or Dick's Last Stand) (1974)
- Spike Milligan with Jeremy Taylor: An Adult Entertainment Live at Cambridge University (1974)
- Spike Milligan and Ed Welch Sing Songs From Q8 (1978)
- Puckoon (1980)
- Adolf Hitler – My Part in His Downfall (1981)
- Spike Milligan: Wolves, Witches & Giants (1982)
- Unspun Socks From a Chicken's Laundry (1982)
- Where Have All the Bullets Gone? (1989)
- Peace Work (1995)
- Rommel? Gunner Who? (1997)
- Mussolini: His Part in My Downfall (1997)
- Spike Milligan: The Parkinson Interviews (2002)

== See also ==
- List of honorary British knights and dames
