= Mussolini: His Part in My Downfall =

Book by Spike Milligan

- First h/b edition
- Author: Spike Milligan
- Language: English
- Genre: Autobiography, Comic novel, Satire
- Publisher: Michael Joseph (hardback), Penguin Books (paperback)
- Publication date: 1978
- Publication place: England
- Media type: Print (hardback and paperback)
- Pages: 288 (paperback)
- ISBN: 0-7181-1738-7 (hardback), 9780140051964 (paperback)
- OCLC: 5354866
- Dewey Decimal: 940.54/81/41
- LC Class: D745.2 .M53 1978
- Preceded by: Monty: His Part in My Victory
- Followed by: Where Have All the Bullets Gone?

Spike Milligan's fourth volume of war memoirs, Mussolini: His Part in My Downfall, spans the landing in Salerno, Italy on 23 September 1943 to his being invalided. While this is only four months, the text is nearly as long as the three earlier volumes together. Although the humorous writing is similar, there are no ersatz communiques and almost no sketches; the photographs are fewer and smaller.

Losing patience with criticism about his veracity, the preface reads, "I’ve spent a fortune on beer and dinners interviewing my old Battery mates, and phone calls to those overseas ran into over a hundred pounds." Also, "I wish the reader to know that he is not reading a tissue of lies and fancies, it all really happened." (Following this book Milligan was even more upset, by comments from the people he wrote about. His manager Norma Farnes wrote that she thought the next volume would never be written on their account.) Farnes wrote that Milligan's diary was kept daily, except when the fighting was too fierce but there are also days when he is too sick or bored to write. Sometimes the diaries of others supplement Milligan's in the text.

== Summary ==
Milligan's Italian adventures start well, as one of their battery guns knocks the top off an enemy hill just sighting down the barrel. The next day he has a temperature of 103 and is sent to a hospital. Although he's released in a few days, transport back to his group is not available until 19 October, during which time he gets leave in Naples and Pompeii. Otherwise, he is so bored he volunteers for work. He defends his favourite comics to a North Country soldier:

"Gracie Fields," I guffawed, "she's as funny as a steam roller going over a baby."
"You must be bludy thick, she's a scream."
"Yes, I scream every time I hear her sing."
"Ooo do you think is foony them?"
"W.C. Fields, Marx Brothers."
"Oooo?"

The other preferred George Formby, who "cud play 'is bludy 'ead off." The idea of a headless Formby fills Milligan with delight.

A threat to desert sent to Major Jenkins finally elicits a truck to return Milligan to his group. He returns to find his pack of war souvenirs was lost, with his Nazi war loot, including an Iron Cross and pornographic photographs taken from a dead German soldier in Africa. (Milligan was going to send them home to the soldier's mother.)

The war has been a religious turning point for Milligan:

A Catholic priest visited us this evening and asked if anyone wanted Confession and Holy Communion. I nearly went but since the war started, my belief in a God had suffered a reverse. I couldn't equate all the killing by two sides, both of whom claimed to be a Christian society. I was, as Gary Cooper would say, 'kinda mixed up inside'.

On 5 December the men are billeted in a four-story Victorian Gothic farmhouse, including utility buildings. They clean vigorously, including a yard so heavily covered with manure that when they uncover the cobblestone, the farmer who had lived there since a boy says he didn't know it existed. During the night, rain fills the courtyard with manure again. Before Christmas the men organize a show, however lack of facilities reduce it to nudity, instead of the more rarefied skits and music — in spite of Italian farmers and their wives being invited.

On the 27th, they are on leave in Amalfi:

The whole place has architectural maturity: there are numerous creepers and vines growing in profusion on the walls and balconies. In summer it must be a riot of flowers, right now it's a riot of gunners, there is a scramble as we dash for the best beds (if any)....

Of the many complaints Milligan and the men have about their Major Jenkins, are his poor musical abilities, lack of humour and not keeping the men notified about orders. In the end of the book, an observation post is in a "dodgy" situation and Jenkins has sent up everyone for duty there, except himself. Milligan is sent up but doesn't come back under his own power, after being hit by a mortar bomb:

....he can see us! We hit the deck. A rain of them fall around us. I cling to the ground. The mortars rain down on us. I'll have a fag, that's what. I am holding a packet of Woodbines, there is a noise like thunder. It's right on my head, there's a high-pitched whistle in my ears, at first I black out and then I see red....I know if we stay here we'll all die...I start to scramble down the hill.

Major Jenkins criticizes him but Milligan can't stop shaking and crying. He's invalided and "court martialled" by Jenkins, despite a discharge certificate reading "This man must be rested behind the lines for a period to stabilise his condition". Tranquillizers turn him into a zombie. "All the laughing had stopped," he writes. For the moment.

== Critical reception ==
The Sunday Express reviewer wrote, "Hilarious, irreverent and laced with Milligan's unique brand of crazy humour".
