= Q... (TV series) =

British TV comedy series (1969–1982)

- Logo c. 1969
- Genre: Comedy
- Created by: Spike Milligan; Neil Shand
- Starring: Spike Milligan
- Opening theme: "The Q5 Piano Tune" by Spike Milligan
- Country of origin: United Kingdom
- No. of episodes: 38 (4 missing)

Production
- Running time: 30 minutes

Original release
- Network: BBC Two
- Release: 24 March 1969 – 25 October 1982

Q... is a surreal television comedy sketch show written by Spike Milligan and Neil Shand, and starring Spike Milligan with supporting players, usually including Julia Breck, John Bluthal, Bob Todd, and John Wells. The show ran from 1969 to 1982 on BBC2. There were six series in all, the first five numbered from Q5 to Q9, and a final series titled There's a Lot of It About. The first and third series ran for seven episodes, and the others for six episodes, each of which was 30 minutes long.

Various reasons have been suggested for the title. One possibility is that it was inspired by the project to construct the Cunard liner QE2, launched in September 1967, which was previously codenamed Q4. Another theory is that Milligan was inspired by the BBC 6-point technical quality scale of the time, where "Q5" was severe degradation to picture or sound, and "Q6" was complete loss of sound or vision. This was extended by some engineering departments to a 9-point scale, finishing at "Q9". According to Milligan's autobiography, the final series was renamed There's a Lot of It About after the BBC felt the public might find Q10 too confusing.

== Forerunner in comedy ==
Though many found it to be more hit-and-miss than Milligan's earlier work, especially The Goon Show, it is considered by many to be one of the landmarks in British comedy. In particular Q5, which first aired on 24 March 1969, and with its surreal bent and almost stream-of-consciousness format is seen by many as a forerunner to Monty Python's Flying Circus, which debuted a few months later. The Pythons themselves remember that, having seen Q5, they had been forced to scurry around for a new hook for their series, as the format they had been intending to use had now already been done. Michael Palin recalls "Terry Jones and I adored the Q... shows...[Milligan] was the first writer to play with the conventions of television."

Scudamore (1985, p. 170) cites one interview with the Pythons in which John Cleese said: "Shows prepare the way for other shows, and sometimes shows that make genuine breakthroughs are missed. Spike Milligan's Q5 was missed...when we first saw Q5 we were very depressed because we thought it was what we wanted to do and Milligan was doing it brilliantly. But nobody really noticed Q5". Terry Jones, Michael Palin and Terry Gilliam concurred. Jones noted that "watching Q5, we almost felt as if our guns had been Spiked! We had been writing quickies or sketches for some three years and they always had a beginning, a middle and a tag line. Suddenly, watching Spike Milligan, we realized that they didn't have to be like that".

Also, in the Pythons' (2004) autobiography, Cleese cites a conversation between himself and Terry Jones: "We both happened to watch Spike Milligan's Q5, and one or the other of us phoned up and said kind of jokingly but also rather anxiously, 'I thought that's what we were supposed to be doing?' And the other one said, 'That's what I thought too.' We felt that Spike had got to where we were trying to get to, but if you'd asked us the previous day, we couldn't have described very well what that was. However, when we saw it on the screen we recognised it, and in a way the fact that Spike had gone there probably enabled us to go a little bit further than we would otherwise have gone" (p. 191).

In the Python autobiography, Michael Palin mentions meeting their directors. "One was Ian MacNaughton, director of the Spike Milligan Q5 series which we all thought was one of the best comedy shows on TV and certainly the most far ahead..." (p. 218). He describes himself and Terry Jones as being so impressed with the Q... show that they specifically sought out MacNaughton to direct their own series.

== Development ==
While Flying Circus had four series between 1969 and 1974, because of Milligan's tempestuous relationship with the BBC, he had to wait until 1975 for his second series, Q6, to be commissioned. The series continued sporadically after this. Q7 appeared in 1978, Q8 shortly after in 1979 (two years before the Kuwait Petroleum Corporation registered the trademark; the TV series' opening credits showed the characters 'Q8' being formed from the word 'Kuwait'), Q9 in 1980 and There's a Lot of It About in 1982. Milligan resented the BBC for the cold attitude they took towards the series in comparison with series like Flying Circus, and always maintained that, given the opportunity, he would have produced more. The shows were written by Milligan and his writing collaborator Neil Shand, with occasional episodes (especially in later years) giving "additional contribution" credit to any or all of David Renwick, Andrew Marshall, and John Antrobus.

Q gave centre stage to Milligan's freeform surreal wit. The sketches came thick and fast, running into one another, making outrageous leaps from one subject or location to another and often stopping with no apparent conclusion. Even the costumes were madcap and contradictory – in some episodes each of them still bore its BBC Wardrobe Department tag – and Milligan seemed to have a fondness for large noses and hats.

However, Milligan was criticised for his tendency to make racially charged jokes, especially regarding Jews and Pakistanis. The series as a whole was decidedly risqué even by the standards of the 1970s – almost every episode featured an appearance by the scantily-clad, huge-breasted "glamour stooge" Julia Breck.

== Episodes ==
Series	Title	Episodes	First Aired	Last Aired
1	Q5	7	24 March 1969	5 May 1969
2	Q6	6	6 November 1975	11 December 1975
3	Q7	7	3 January 1978	21 February 1978
4	Q8	6	4 April 1979	9 May 1979
5	Q9	6	17 June 1980	22 July 1980
6	There's a Lot of It About	6	20 September 1982	25 October 1982

Archive status

34 of the 38 "Q" episodes still exist. Through the mid-1970s, the BBC had a policy of wiping master copies of previously aired shows in order to reuse the videotape, or disposing of master videotapes altogether in order to reduce storage costs. This affected series Q5. Four of the seven episodes are now lost, although off-air audio recordings of at least two of these are known to exist. Episodes 2 and 3 both survive as 16mm black and white tele-recordings. Episode 4 exists in colour in its original form, and a few short clips from this colour episode appeared on the documentary Heroes of Comedy: Spike Milligan, and again on BBC4's "Assorted Q" in December 2014.

All of Q6 exists, as does all of Q7, Q8, Q9 and There's a Lot of It About.

In 2022, film rolls containing sketches from one of the missing Q5 episodes were discovered in Spike Milligan's personal archive during the making of a documentary about him.

== Guests ==
Most of the episodes featured a relatively 'straight' musical interlude, sometimes performed by Milligan himself, or his collaborators Ed Welch or Alan Clare at the piano. There were also appearances by jazz groups, ragtime bands, singer-songwriters and the Mike Sammes Singers, who received custard pies in their faces at the end of one performance. Some of the musical clips were included in the BBC Four series Jazz Britannia.

== Regular cast members ==
- Julia Breck
- John Bluthal
- Alan Clare
- Jeannette Charles
- Robert Dorning
- Linzi Drew
- Richard Ingrams
- Peter Jones
- David Lodge
- Chris Langham
- David Rappaport
- Keith Smith
- Stella Tanner
- Bob Todd
- Rita Webb
- John Wells

== Home releases ==
Volume One (containing the first three series) was released on 21 November 2016, Followed by Volume Two (containing the fourth and fifth series) which was released on 27 February 2017.

A 5-disc DVD Collection (consisting the complete second to fifth series, along with all 3 surviving episodes of the first) was released on 20 November 2017.
