= Gormenghast =

Gormenghast may refer to:

- Gormenghast (series), a trilogy of novels by Mervyn Peake
  - Gormenghast (novel), second in the series
- Gormenghast (opera), an opera based on the books
- Gormenghast (TV serial), a BBC adaptation
