= The Bill Hall Trio =

Musical comedy act (ended 1985/6)

The Bill Hall Trio was a musical comedy act originally consisting of Bill Hall (violin), Johnny Mulgrew (double bass) and Spike Milligan (guitar). They met through the Combined Services Entertainment programme during World War II and the trio continued in its original form until 1947/8. They were featured on a Pathé newsreel of 1947. In the same year they appeared on television on the BBC's Variety programme. After Milligan left, the Bill Hall Trio obtained a new guitarist (who according to Mulgrew was like George Formby) and other new members whenever old members left or died. The group went on until the death (from throat cancer) of Johnny Mulgrew. Johnny Mulgrew died on 1 August 1985. Peace Work was published in 1992, and in it Milligan stated that when Johnny Mulgrew died six years earlier, the trio came to an end.

In an interview with Tony Brown in 1970, Milligan mentioned that Bill Hall and Johnny Mulgrew were already dead then. "The trio I worked with was the Bill Hall Trio – which became Hall, Norman and Ladd eventually. Bill Hall died from consumption; Johnny Mulgrew who used to play bass with the Ambrose Octet before the war, he died – also from consumption. I think the act is still going."
