= "Rommel?" "Gunner Who?" =

Autobiographical novel by Spike Milligan

- First edition cover
- Author: Spike Milligan; Jack Hobbs editor
- Language: English
- Genre: Autobiography, Comic novel, Satire
- Published: 1974 (Michael Joseph Ltd.)
- Publication place: England
- Media type: Print (Hardback & Paperback)
- Pages: 192
- ISBN: 0-7181-0733-0 (hardback), 0140041079 (paperback)
- OCLC: 2005548
- Dewey Decimal: 940.54/81/41
- LC Class: D811 .M52525 1974
- Preceded by: Adolf Hitler: My Part in his Downfall
- Followed by: Monty: His Part in My Victory

"Rommel?" "Gunner Who?": A Confrontation in the Desert is Spike Milligan's second volume of war autobiography, published in 1974, with Jack Hobbs credited as an editor. This book spans events from January to May 1943, during Operation Torch the Allied invasion of Morocco and Algeria and the Tunisia Campaign in World War II. (The preface to the earlier book states this would be a trilogy, but he wrote seven volumes.) Erwin Rommel was the Axis commander in north Africa.

As before, the book is in an unusual format freely mixing multimedia formats, with narrative anecdotes, contemporaneous photography, ridiculously non-contemporaneous steel engravings and illustrations, excerpts from diaries, letters and rough sketches, along with absurd memoranda from Nazi officials (sometimes called "Hitlergrams"). A map is included.

In a later volume, Milligan wrote, "I wish the reader to know that he is not reading a tissue of lies and fancies, it all really happened". In retrospect, the reader is left in some doubt – for the Prologue to this volume reads:

"I have described nothing but what I saw myself, or learned from others of whom I made the most careful and particular enquiry.

Thucydides. Peloponnesian War.

I've just jazzed mine up a little.

Milligan. World War II."

Some details, such as a facsimile clipping announcing the death of a comrade (an atypical sombre moment in the book) can be assumed factual. Moreover, much other information is apparently intended to be accurate:

"Around the main lagoon were dotted smaller lagoons and around the fringe, what appeared to be pink scum. In fact it was hundreds of flamingoes. This vision, the name of Sheba, the sun, the crystal white and silver shimmer of the salt lagoon made boyhood readings of Rider Haggard come alive. It was a sight I can never forget, so engraved was it that I was able to dash it down straight onto the typewriter after a gap of thirty years."

On the other hand, speaking of the dedication to "brother Desmond who made my boyhood happy", Norma Farnes, editor of The Compulsive Spike Milligan said "Desmond and I roared with laughter over this fantasy. They used to argue like hell."

== Summary ==
Milligan's 19 Battery 56th Heavy Rgt. R.A. has arrived in Algeria. With his rank of gunner, there is no one under his command; his promotion later in the book is the source of comment. An officer, Lt. Budden says: "Bombardier?" He turned and looked out the window. "Oh, dear."

One of Milligan's first battle encounters is to yell at a passing aeroplane "I hope you crash, you noisy bastard!" — it immediately does. But the plane was Allied.

After a couple of weeks they leave the comforts in the area of Cap Matifou, heading east into battle areas, and are now eating army food. Their cook is upper class:

"'Where'd you get that accent, Ronnie?'....
'Eton, old sausage.'
'Well, I'd stop eatin' old sausages.'"

Milligan stays in various accommodations, from a two-man tent stolen from American supplies (which his best friend Edgington burns down while attacking a scorpion) to appropriated housing. The native Arabs are still in the area. Milligan sneaks food a few times to a farmer whose family is "having a rough time". Later they adopt a French dog; when the owner returns to check his house, he mistakenly shoots it; they spend the evening drinking with him in commiseration.

As they see action, one gun crew is puzzled to discover their gun is missing after being fired. It's gone over a cliff, and narrowly avoids killing future Goon Harry Secombe, whom Milligan later meets in passing:

"I saw something that I felt might put years on the war. It was a short Gunner, wearing iron frame spectacles, a steel helmet that obscured the top of his head, and baggy shorts that looked like a Tea Clipper under full sail....It was my first sight of Gunner Secombe: what a pity! We were so near to Victory, and this had to happen. I hadn't crossed myself in years, and I remember saying, 'Please God...put him out of his misery.'"

Part of Milligan's job is laying phone lines. On one occasion silence is imperative, since they're close to the enemy. However the hole in the cable drum spool is square, making a great noise as it unreels.

"There was a suppressed laughter. Unable to stop it, we all burst out laughing again.
'Stop it at once!' said Dawson, through his own laughter. We stopped. 'Now stop it, or I'll kill the bloody lot of you.'
A white star shell lit the night.
'What's that?' asked Ernie Hart.
'That, Ernie, means that a child has been born in Bethlehem.'"

There's limited time for band music, but Milligan and Edgington play on opposite sides of a bombed out floor. Shortly after Edgington finishes, the piano falls through. Milligan reflects: "It's not often we had been detailed to:—'Clean up that mess of a French Colonial Piano.'"

While driving with Major Chater Jack:

"'How does it go again? called Chater. I re-sang the opening bars with intermittent rain.
'Doesn't he know any other tunes,' said Edward.
"'Any others? Christ, he doesn't know this one, he only brings me along as an amanuensis.'"

Amid Milligan's persistent whistling and joking are moments of reflection:

"We sang songs, those nostalgic slushy moon-June love songs that had fucked-up my generation. ... If I sang a song, I was Bing Crosby, if I played trumpet, Louis Armstrong ... but who was I when washing out my socks?"

And, at the end of the book, as the army triumphantly enters Tunis:

"Here was I, anti-war, but like the rest of us feeling the exhilaration of the barbarian."

== Release ==
"Rommel?" "Gunner Who?" was published in 1974 through Michael Joseph Ltd., as a sequel to Milligan's prior book Adolf Hitler: My Part in his Downfall.

== Critical review ==
The Morning Star review noted that "The second volume of Milligan's war biography left me with a determination to repair the omission of not having read the first volume ... and an equal determination to look out for the third volume when it appears."

The novel received reviews from The Sydney Morning Herald and the Grimsby Evening Telegraph, the former of which praised it for its humour and felt that it would make for a good Christmas present.
