= Alan Clare =

British jazz pianist (1921–1993)

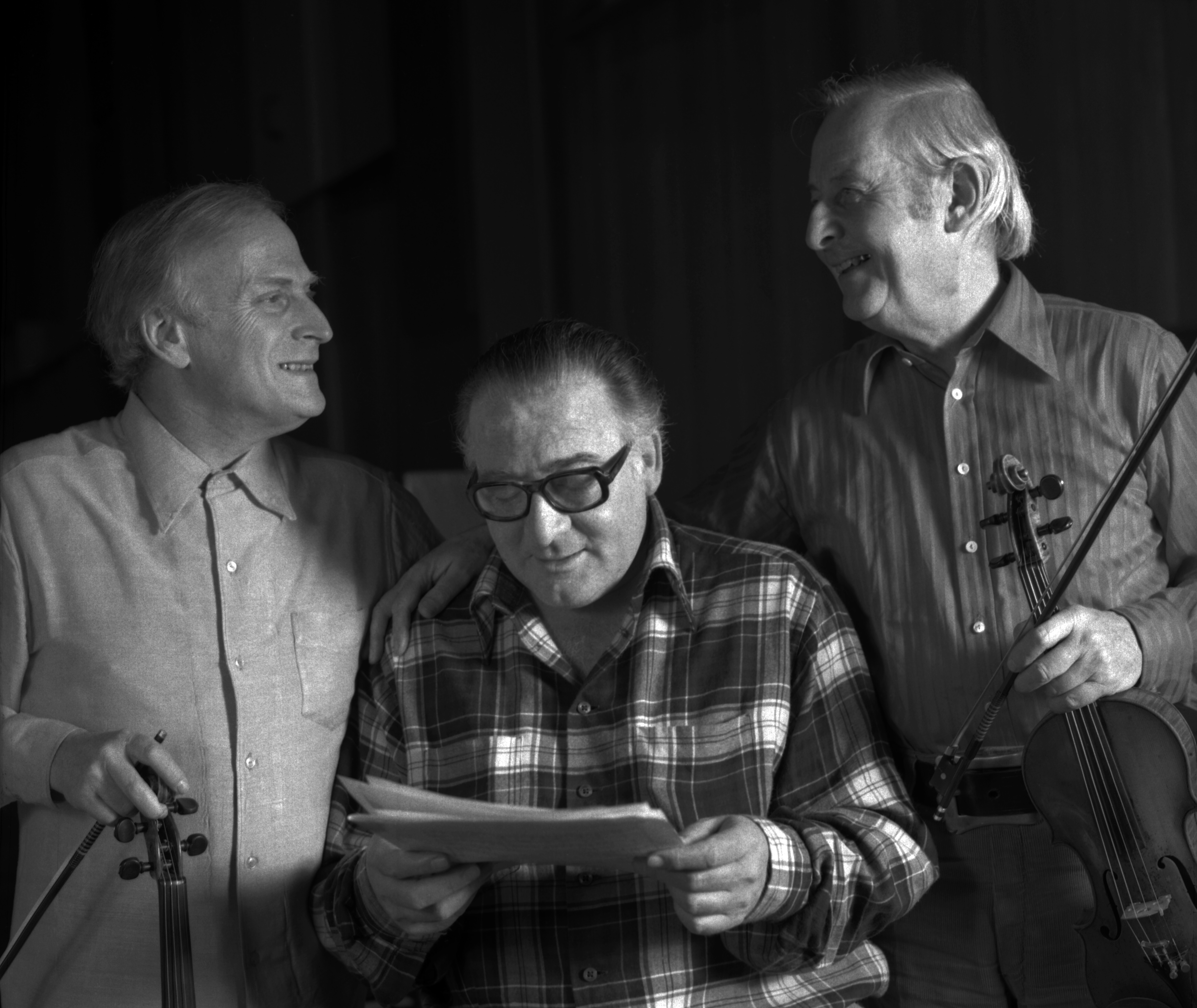
- Alan Clare (centre) with Stephane Grappelli & Yehudi Menuhin, photo by Allan Warren

Background information
- Born: Alan George Jaycock; 31 May 1921; London, England
- Died: 29 November 1993 (aged 72) London, England
- Genres: Jazz; continental jazz
- Occupation: Musician
- Instrument: Piano

Alan George Clare (born Alan George Jaycock; 31 May 1921 – 29 November 1993) was a British jazz pianist and composer.

== Family ==
Singer Bloom Rose Houtman married Alan Clare in 1947. Alan and Bloom lived for most of their marriage in Holland Park, London, at 86A Holland Park, where the Holland Park Set would meet up to rehearse for The Telegoons.

== Career ==
Clare was born in London and began playing the piano as a young child. After leaving school at the age of 14, he played in local nightclubs. In the early 1940s he played in small bands led by Stephen Miller and Roy Marsh, then with Stephane Grappelli; he then had a residency and briefly performed with pianist George Shearing and Sid Phillips. His musical career was interrupted by military service, which ended in 1946.

Alan was an original member of the Holland Park Set in London that included, Peter Sellers, Spike Milligan, Stéphane Grappelli, Harry Secombe etc. They would regularly meet up at Alan's basement apartment in Holland Park to rehearse for The Telegoons.

For the next two years, Clare's main job was with in Sid Millward's Nitwits, after which he was again with Grappelli for two years. During the period of his 1950–56 residency at the Studio Club in London, Clare also played with Grischa Farfel, Kenny Baker, Harry Parry and Harry Hayes. In the remainder of the 1950s and much of the following decade, he worked at several London clubs. He also appeared on television in the 1960s and 1970s, alongside comedian Spike Milligan. In 1961, he composed the music for the feature film, Seven Keys. Clare reunited with Grappelli in the early 1970s and had club residencies into the early 1990s, although illness curtailed his appearances. Clare died in London on 29 November 1993.

Another close friend of Clare's was the American singer and entertainer Adelaide Hall. Clare was Hall's pianist at live performances for many years. Alan Clare died 22 days after Adelaide Hall's death, the latter of which occurred on 7 November 1993.

== Albums ==
- Holland Park
