= List of The Goon Show episodes =

The following is a list of The Goon Show episodes. The Goon Show was a popular and influential British radio comedy series, originally produced by the BBC from 1951 to 1960 and broadcast on the BBC Home Service.

== Availability of The Goon Show episodes ==
=== Lost episodes ===
Many of the earliest radio episodes no longer exist. When the first episodes were broadcast, recording technology was still expensive and primitive by later standards. Audio tape was not in general use, and any recordings were made directly on to acetate discs. These could be played back, but tended to wear out quickly and did not survive unless further processed to create a master disc, which was only done for recordings intended for sale. Only one episode from the fourth series was preserved in the BBC Sound Archive (as a tape dub from an acetate disc).

Other episodes from Series 2–4 have survived, sometimes in incomplete form, as off-air recordings of varying quality. Four episodes from Series 4 were released on CD as The Goon Show: Series Four, Part One (2010). A further seven episodes from Series 2–4 are included in The Goon Show Compendium Volume 13 (2017) along with the only surviving fragment of the Series 4 episode "The Giant Bombardon". Volume 14 (2018) includes all of the remaining Series 4 episodes, including those from the 2010 set.

The special episodes "Archie in Goonland" (1954) (a crossover with Educating Archie) and "The Missing Christmas Parcel – Post Early for Christmas" (1955) (a 15-minute insert in Children's Hour) are also believed lost.

=== Surviving episodes ===
Commencing with the start of the fifth series (in 1954), BBC Transcription Services began making copies for overseas sales, and even commissioned re-recordings of some key fourth series episodes for the "Vintage Goons" series, which was mainly intended for overseas markets. The Transcription versions were then cut to remove topical and parochial material and anything that might be potentially offensive. Later, Transcription Services releases had further cuts for timing purposes. For many years, these abridged versions were thought to be only surviving copies of many episodes.

In 1987, when BBC producer Richard Edis selected "The International Christmas Pudding" for a Radio 2 repeat, he discovered the edited Transcription Services copy was too short for the intended slot. He consulted sound engineer and researcher Ted Kendall, who'd been working on rebuilding the BBC's Goons archive and had found a tape of the original transmission version of the episode in a collection made by dubbing mixer Peter Copeland. Kendall was able to restore the missing material.

In 1991, Dirk Maggs brought Kendall onto the team for his documentary At Last the Go On Show, and Kendall informed him of twelve episodes whose commercial rights had been licensed to EMI, which had then released them in truncated form. The BBC therefore didn't have the rights to release them commercially - but they did still hold the broadcast rights. This prompted Maggs to commission Kendall to restore sixteen episodes, including the ones tied up with EMI, for two repeat runs. The first of these ran on Radio 2, starting with "The Lost Emperor" on 18 April 1992, and the other was on Radio 4 starting with "The Call of the West" on 12 October 1992.

In the years since then, a considerable amount of missing material has been found and restored to the Transcription copies. Kendall states in his sleeve notes to the Goon Show Compendium CD box sets that the episodes have been pieced together from sources including the BBC Sound Archive and Transcription Services master tapes and discs, unofficial copies made by engineers or other BBC staff, and domestic off-air recordings, using the best quality source in each case.

Kendall also notes that Transcription Services seem to have used the original broadcast tapes as the basis for their versions, making cuts as necessary. The cut material was often spliced onto the end of the reels in case it needed to be restored. When the "Vintage Goons" series began, episodes were recorded by TS at Maida Vale. Since these were performed on the same nights as Series 8 episodes, it made sense for Transcription Services to make their own simultaneous recordings at Maida Vale and it seems that this technique was also used on Series 9 and 10. These were then edited to match the broadcast versions before TS made its own cuts. However, it seems that in some cases the TS versions inadvertently preserved lines slated for deletion, meaning that longer cuts of these episodes can be reassembled.

=== Commercial releases ===
Parlophone, a division of EMI, released several discs of The Goon Show starting with The Best of the Goon Shows in 1959. In all, EMI released twelve episodes, but for contractual reasons these were all heavily cut to remove musical interludes and other music cues.

BBC Records issued the first volume of Goon Show Classics in 1974 on record and tape, featuring "The Dreaded Batter Pudding Hurler" and "The Histories of Pliny the Elder". The Goon Show Classics label was used for several further records and subsequently a series of double-cassette collections containing four episodes each. In 1996 this gave way to CD sets of remastered episodes, eventually running to 30 volumes containing 120 shows, plus an additional CD set comprising The Last Goon Show of All and Goon Again.

Volume 1 of The Goon Show Compendium, containing the first 13 episodes of series 5, was released on 7 April 2008, starting a comprehensive release programme of all extant Goons material. In 2015 three of the EMI-licensed episodes were included without the cuts, in their original chronological order, on The Goon Show Compendium Volume 11, indicating that the rights had by then reverted to the BBC. It was later confirmed that Volume 12, released on 3 November 2016, would include all of the remaining EMI episodes, plus The Last Goon Show of All and bonus features.

=== Broadcasting ===
Archive episodes of The Goon Show are regularly broadcast on BBC Radio 4 Extra; previously they were occasionally repeated on Radio 2 or Radio 4 in the United Kingdom.

The ABC Radio National network in Australia has regularly broadcast The Goon Show since the 1960s. For many years, the series was broadcast every Saturday afternoon, just after the midday news bulletin. More recently, it was broadcast twice a week, on Friday mornings and Sunday afternoons. The network took the series off the air in January 2004, but following listener response to the cancellation, broadcasts of the show resumed in the Friday time slot in June. The ABC's broadcasts of the series have made The Goon Show one of the most repeated and longest-running of all radio programmes.

The programme has been broadcast in the United States. NBC broadcast The Goon Show as early as the mid-1950s. Terry Gilliam of the Goon-influenced Monty Python comedy troupe recalled first hearing it broadcast on FM radio in New York City in the 1960s. When Vermont Public Radio signed on the air in 1977 (as a single station which has since evolved into a statewide network), the first programme to air was an episode of The Goon Show. The show was described as a "madcap radio comedy classic".

== Episodes ==
The following list of episodes of The Goon Show includes any "specials" and all episodes made for the BBC Transcription Service unaired domestically at the time (and therefore listed at the date of their recording).

=== Series overview ===
Series	Number of episodes	First episode	Final episode	Date of season special(s)	Ref
1	17	28 May 1951	20 September 1951	16 December 1951	
2	25	22 January 1952	15 July 1952		
3	25	11 November 1952	5 May 1953	3 June 1953	
4	30	2 October 1953	19 April 1954	11 June 1954; 31 August 1954	
5	26	28 September 1954	22 March 1955		
6	27	20 September 1955	3 April 1956	8 December 1955; 29 August 1956	
7	25	4 October 1956	28 March 1957	22 August 1957 (Note: A special was recorded on 2 December 1956 for broadcast on the BBC Transcription Services and was not heard in Britain. A second special was broadcast on 24 December 1956 on the BBC General Overseas Service only.)	
8	26	30 September 1957	24 March 1958		
Vintage Goons	14	6 October 1957	23 March 1958		
9	17	3 November 1958 (Note: Six episodes of Vintage Goons were broadcast 22 September 1958 – 27 October 1958, prior to the start of series nine.)	23 February 1959		
10	6	24 December 1959	28 January 1960		

One-off special shows

Series	Number of shows	Date of broadcast	Date of broadcast	Ref
One-off specials	2	5 October 1972	29 May 2001	

BBC recording numbers
Code	Definition
SLO	33 1/3 rpm coarse groove 16" disk recorded at Broadcasting House
SBU	33 1/3 rpm coarse groove 16" disk recorded at Bush House
SOX	33 1/3 rpm coarse groove 16" disk recorded at 200 Oxford Street
TLO	15 i.p.s. tape recorded at Broadcasting House
TBU	15 i.p.s. tape recorded at Bush House
TNC	15 i.p.s. tape recorded in Newcastle

=== First series: Crazy People (1951) ===
Cast: Peter Sellers, Harry Secombe, Spike Milligan, Michael Bentine, The Ray Ellington Quartet, The Stargazers, Max Geldray and the BBC Dance Orchestra, conducted by Stanley Black.
Announcer: Andrew Timothy
The shows were all recorded on a Sunday; episodes 1–9 were broadcast on Mondays, 10–17 were broadcast on Thursdays. No episodes are known to survive.

Episode #	Title	Recording number	Original airdate	Producer	Scriptwriter(s)	Notes
1	Untitled	SLO 90268	28 May 1951	Dennis Main Wilson	Spike Milligan, Larry Stephens, Jimmy Grafton	
2	Untitled	SLO 90269	4 June 1951	Dennis Main Wilson	Spike Milligan, Larry Stephens, Jimmy Grafton	
3	Untitled	SLO 90452	11 June 1951	Dennis Main Wilson	Spike Milligan, Larry Stephens, Jimmy Grafton	
4	Untitled	SLO 90366	18 June 1951	Dennis Main Wilson	Spike Milligan, Larry Stephens, Jimmy Grafton	
5	Untitled	SLO 59949	25 June 1951	Dennis Main Wilson	Spike Milligan, Larry Stephens, Jimmy Grafton	
6	Untitled	SLO 91295	2 July 1951	Dennis Main Wilson	Spike Milligan, Larry Stephens, Jimmy Grafton	
7	Untitled	SLO 91565	9 July 1951	Dennis Main Wilson	Spike Milligan, Larry Stephens, Jimmy Grafton	
8	Untitled	SLO 92262	16 July 1951	Dennis Main Wilson	Spike Milligan, Larry Stephens, Jimmy Grafton	Denys Drower replaced Andrew Timothy as announcer
9	Untitled	SLO 92468	23 July 1951	Dennis Main Wilson	Spike Milligan, Larry Stephens, Jimmy Grafton	
10	Untitled	SLO 92867	2 August 1951	Dennis Main Wilson	Spike Milligan, Larry Stephens, Jimmy Grafton	Denys Drower replaced Andrew Timothy as announcer
11	Untitled	SOX 61088	9 August 1951	Leslie Bridgmont	Spike Milligan, Larry Stephens, Jimmy Grafton	
12	Untitled	SLO 93368	16 August 1951	Leslie Bridgmont	Spike Milligan, Larry Stephens, Jimmy Grafton	
13	Untitled	SOX 61088	23 August 1951	Leslie Bridgmont	Spike Milligan, Larry Stephens, Jimmy Grafton	
14	Untitled	SLO 93400	30 August 1951	Leslie Bridgmont	Spike Milligan, Larry Stephens, Jimmy Grafton	
15	Untitled	SBU 71149	6 September 1951	Dennis Main Wilson	Spike Milligan, Larry Stephens, Jimmy Grafton	
16	Untitled	SLO 94892	13 September 1951	Dennis Main Wilson	Spike Milligan, Larry Stephens, Jimmy Grafton	
17	Untitled	SLO 95143	20 September 1951	Dennis Main Wilson	Spike Milligan, Larry Stephens, Jimmy Grafton	
Special	"Cinderella"	SLO 99928	26 December 1951	Dennis Main Wilson	Spike Milligan, Larry Stephens, Jimmy Grafton	Lizbeth Webb was Cinderella; Graham Stark was Prince Charming

=== Second series (1952) ===
Cast: Peter Sellers, Harry Secombe, Spike Milligan, Michael Bentine, The Ray Ellington Quartet, Max Geldray and the BBC Dance Orchestra, conducted by Stanley Black. The Stargazers were present for the first six shows only.
Announcer: Andrew Timothy
The shows were all recorded on a Sunday, except episodes 24 and 25; all episodes were broadcast on Tuesdays. Only three episodes are known to survive as truncated, off-air recordings.

Episodes 1, 3 and 25 released on The Goon Show Compendium Vol.13.

Episode #	Title	Recording number	Original airdate	Producer	Scriptwriter(s)	Notes
1	Untitled	SLO 1768	22 January 1952	Dennis Main Wilson	Spike Milligan, Larry Stephens, Jimmy Grafton	
2	Untitled	SLO 2147	29 January 1952	Dennis Main Wilson	Spike Milligan, Larry Stephens, Jimmy Grafton	
3	Untitled	SLO 2519	5 February 1952	Dennis Main Wilson	Spike Milligan, Larry Stephens, Jimmy Grafton	
4	Untitled	SLO 2519	19 February 1952	Dennis Main Wilson	Spike Milligan, Larry Stephens, Jimmy Grafton	
5	Untitled	SLO 3334	26 February 1952	Dennis Main Wilson	Spike Milligan, Larry Stephens, Jimmy Grafton	
6	Untitled	SLO 3627	4 March 1952	Dennis Main Wilson	Spike Milligan, Larry Stephens, Jimmy Grafton	
7	Untitled	SLO 4179	11 March 1952	Dennis Main Wilson	Spike Milligan, Larry Stephens, Jimmy Grafton	
8	Untitled	SLO 5112	18 March 1952	Dennis Main Wilson	Spike Milligan, Larry Stephens, Jimmy Grafton	
9	Untitled	SLO 5277	25 March 1952	Dennis Main Wilson	Spike Milligan, Larry Stephens, Jimmy Grafton	
10	Untitled	SLO 5380	1 April 1952	Dennis Main Wilson	Spike Milligan, Larry Stephens, Jimmy Grafton	
11	Untitled	SLO 5684	8 April 1952	Dennis Main Wilson	Spike Milligan, Larry Stephens, Jimmy Grafton	Recorded without Milligan
12	Untitled	SLO 6306	15 April 1952	Dennis Main Wilson	Spike Milligan, Larry Stephens, Jimmy Grafton	
13	Untitled	SLO 6737	22 April 1952	Dennis Main Wilson	Spike Milligan, Larry Stephens, Jimmy Grafton	
14	Untitled	SLO 6959	29 April 1952	Dennis Main Wilson	Spike Milligan, Larry Stephens, Jimmy Grafton	
15	Untitled	SBU 83555	6 May 1952	Dennis Main Wilson	Spike Milligan, Larry Stephens, Jimmy Grafton	
16	Untitled	SLO 7761	13 May 1952	Dennis Main Wilson	Spike Milligan, Larry Stephens, Jimmy Grafton	
17	Untitled	SLO 8202	20 May 1952	Dennis Main Wilson	Spike Milligan, Larry Stephens, Jimmy Grafton	
18	Untitled	SLO 8179	27 May 1952	Dennis Main Wilson	Spike Milligan, Larry Stephens, Jimmy Grafton	
19	Untitled	SLO 9302	3 June 1952	Dennis Main Wilson	Spike Milligan, Larry Stephens, Jimmy Grafton	Also included the BBC Revue Orchestra, conducted by Robert Busby
20	Untitled	SLO 9307	10 June 1952	Dennis Main Wilson	Spike Milligan, Larry Stephens, Jimmy Grafton	Also included the BBC Revue Orchestra, conducted by Wally Stott
21	Untitled	SLO 9638	17 June 1952	Dennis Main Wilson	Spike Milligan, Larry Stephens, Jimmy Grafton	Recorded without Bentine
22	Untitled	SLO 9955	24 June 1952	Dennis Main Wilson	Spike Milligan, Larry Stephens, Jimmy Grafton	
23	Untitled	SLO 10474	1 July 1952	Dennis Main Wilson	Spike Milligan, Larry Stephens, Jimmy Grafton	
24	Untitled	SLO 11378	8 July 1952	Dennis Main Wilson	Spike Milligan, Larry Stephens, Jimmy Grafton	
25	Untitled	SLO 10808	15 July 1952	Dennis Main Wilson	Spike Milligan, Larry Stephens, Jimmy Grafton	

=== Third series (1952–53) ===
Cast: Peter Sellers, Harry Secombe, Spike Milligan, with Max Geldray and The Ray Ellington Quartet, orchestra conducted by Wally Stott.
Announcer: Andrew Timothy
The shows were all broadcast on Tuesdays, with the exception of episode 7, a Christmas special. Only one excerpt and one full episode are known to survive.

Episode 17 and an excerpt of episode 16 released on The Goon Show Compendium Vol.13

Episode #	Title	Recording number	Original airdate	Producer	Scriptwriter(s)	Notes
1	"Fred of the Islands"	SLO 17297	11 November 1952	Peter Eton	Spike Milligan, Larry Stephens, Jimmy Grafton	
2	"The Egg of the Great Auk"	SOX 82948	18 November 1952	Peter Eton	Spike Milligan, Larry Stephens, Jimmy Grafton	
3	"I Was a Male Fan Dancer"	SLO 18332	25 November 1952	Peter Eton	Spike Milligan, Larry Stephens, Jimmy Grafton	
4	"The Saga of HMS Aldgate"	SLO 18613	2 December 1952	Peter Eton	Spike Milligan, Larry Stephens, Jimmy Grafton	
5	"The Expedition for Toothpaste"	SLO 18848	9 December 1952	Peter Eton	Larry Stephens, Jimmy Grafton	Recorded without Milligan
6	"The Archers"	SLO 19414	16 December 1952	Peter Eton	Larry Stephens, Jimmy Grafton	Recorded without Milligan
7	"Robin Hood"	SLO 19526	26 December 1952	Peter Eton	Jimmy Grafton	Christmas pantomime: running time: 45 minutes Recorded without Milligan, with Dick Emery and Carole Carr
8	"Where Does Santa Claus Go in the Summer?"	SLO 19783	30 December 1952	Peter Eton	Larry Stephens, Jimmy Grafton	Recorded without Milligan, with Ellis Powell
9	"The Navy, Army and Air Force"	SLO 20695	6 January 1953	Peter Eton	Larry Stephens, Jimmy Grafton	Recorded without Milligan, with Dick Emery
10	"The British Way of Life"	SLO 20695	13 January 1953	Peter Eton	Larry Stephens, Jimmy Grafton	Recorded without Milligan, with Graham Stark
11	"A Survey of Britain"	SLO 20948	20 January 1953	Peter Eton	Larry Stephens, Jimmy Grafton	Recorded without Milligan, with Dick Emery
12	"Flint of the Flying Squad"	SLO 21647	27 January 1953	Peter Eton	Larry Stephens, Jimmy Grafton	Recorded without Milligan, with Graham Stark
13	"Seaside Resorts in Winter"	SOX 86757	3 February 1953	Peter Eton	Larry Stephens, Jimmy Grafton	Recorded without Milligan, with Dick Emery
14	"The Tragedy of Oxley Tower"	SLO 22493	10 February 1953	Peter Eton	Larry Stephens, Jimmy Grafton	Recorded without Milligan, with Graham Stark and Valentine Dyall
15	"The Story of Civilization"	SLO 22860	17 February 1953	Peter Eton	Larry Stephens, Jimmy Grafton	Recorded without Milligan, with Dick Emery
16	"The Search for the Bearded Vulture"	SLO 22973	24 February 1953	Peter Eton	Larry Stephens, Jimmy Grafton	Recorded without Milligan, with Graham Stark
17	"The Mystery of the Monkey's Paw"	SLO 23540	3 March 1953	Peter Eton	Spike Milligan, Larry Stephens, Jimmy Grafton	Milligan returned, with Dick Emery
18	"The Mystery of the Cow on the Hill"	SLO24224	10 March 1953	Charles Chilton	Spike Milligan, Larry Stephens, Jimmy Grafton	
19	"Where Do Socks Come From?"	SLO 24432	17 March 1953	Charles Chilton	Spike Milligan, Larry Stephens, Jimmy Grafton	
20	"The Man Who Never Was"	SLO 24764	31 March 1953	Peter Eton	Spike Milligan, Larry Stephens, Jimmy Grafton	This episode, made before the film of the same name came out, was remade twice, in series 6 and 8
21	"The Building of a Suez Canal"	SLO 25520	7 April 1953	Peter Eton	Spike Milligan, Larry Stephens, Jimmy Grafton	
22	"The De Goonlies"	SLO 25873	14 April 1953	Peter Eton	Spike Milligan, Larry Stephens, Jimmy Grafton	
23	"The Conquest of Space"	SLO 26517	21 April 1953	Peter Eton	Spike Milligan, Larry Stephens, Jimmy Grafton	
24	"The Ascent of Mount Everest"	SLO 26797	28 April 1953	Peter Eton	Spike Milligan, Larry Stephens, Jimmy Grafton	
25	"The Story of the Plymouth Hoe Armada"	SLO 27952	5 May 1953	Peter Eton	Spike Milligan, Larry Stephens, Jimmy Grafton	
Special	"Coronation edition"	SLO 29390	3 June 1953	Peter Eton	Spike Milligan, Larry Stephens, Jimmy Grafton	Running time: 40 minutes Without Geldray; with Graham Stark

=== Fourth series (1953–54) ===
Cast: Peter Sellers, Harry Secombe, Spike Milligan, with Max Geldray and The Ray Ellington Quartet, orchestra conducted by Wally Stott.
Announcers: Andrew Timothy (Episodes 1–5) and Wallace Greenslade (Episodes 6–30, plus specials)
Episodes 1–20 were broadcast on Fridays; episodes 21–30 on Mondays.

Episodes 2, 3, 15 and an excerpt of episode 13 released on The Goon Show Compendium Vol.13; Episodes 18–21, 23–27, 29 and "The Starlings" special released on The Goon Show Compendium Vol.14

Episode #	Title	Recording number	Original airdate	Producer	Scriptwriter(s)	Notes
1	"The Dreaded Piano Clubber"	TLO 35079	2 October 1953	Peter Eton	Spike Milligan, Larry Stephens	Remade in the Vintage Goons series
2	"The Man Who Tried to Destroy London's Monuments"	TLO 35432	9 October 1953	Peter Eton	Spike Milligan, Larry Stephens	
3	"The Ghastly Experiments of Dr. Hans Eidelburger"	TLO 35740	16 October 1953	Peter Eton	Spike Milligan, Larry Stephens	
4	"The Building of Britain's First Atomic Cannon"	TLO 36235	23 October 1953	Peter Eton	Spike Milligan, Larry Stephens	
5	"The Gibraltar Story"	TLO 37145	30 October 1953	Peter Eton	Spike Milligan, Larry Stephens	
6	"Through the Sound Barrier in an Airing Cupboard"	TLO 37511	6 November 1953	Peter Eton	Spike Milligan, Larry Stephens	
7	"The First Albert Memorial to the Moon"	TLO 37898	13 November 1953	Peter Eton	Spike Milligan, Larry Stephens	Remade in the Vintage Goons series as "The Albert Memorial"
8	"The Missing Bureaucrat"	TLO 38482	20 November 1953	Peter Eton	Spike Milligan, Larry Stephens	
9	"Operation Bagpipes"	TLO 37891	27 November 1953	Peter Eton	Spike Milligan, Larry Stephens	
10	"The Flying Saucer Mystery"	TLO 39091	4 December 1953	Peter Eton	Larry Stephens	
11	"The Spanish Armada"	TLO 39790	11 December 1953	Peter Eton	Spike Milligan, Larry Stephens	
12	"The British Way"	TLO40412	18 December 1953	Peter Eton	Spike Milligan, Larry Stephens	
Special	Short insert in: "Christmas Crackers"	TLO 40660	25 December 1953	Peter Eton	Spike Milligan, Larry Stephens	
13	"The Giant Bombardon"	TLO 40660	26 December 1953	Peter Eton	Spike Milligan, Larry Stephens	With Michael Bentine; Remade in the Vintage Goons series
14	"Ten Thousand Fathoms Down in a Wardrobe"	TLO 40965	1 January 1954	Peter Eton	Spike Milligan, Larry Stephens	
15	"The Missing Prime Minister"	TLO 41242	8 January 1954	Peter Eton	Spike Milligan, Larry Stephens	Remade in the Vintage Goons series as "The Missing No. 10 Downing Street"
16	"Dr. Jekyll and Mr. Crun"	TLO41552	15 January 1954	Peter Eton	Spike Milligan, Larry Stephens	
17	"The Mummified Priest"	TLO 42416	22 January 1954	Peter Eton	Spike Milligan, Larry Stephens	Remade in the Vintage Goons series
18	"The History of Communications"	TLO 42842	29 January 1954	Peter Eton	Spike Milligan, Larry Stephens	
19	"The Kippered Herring Gang"	TLO 48011	5 February 1954	Peter Eton	Spike Milligan, Larry Stephens	Remade in the Vintage Goons series
20	"The Toothpaste Expedition"	TLO 49072	12 February 1954	Peter Eton	Spike Milligan, Larry Stephens	
21	"The Case of the Vanishing Room"	TLO 49191	15 February 1954	Peter Eton	Spike Milligan	Remade in the Vintage Goons series as "The Vanishing Room"
22	"The Great Ink Drought of 1902"	TLO 49628	22 February 1954	Peter Eton	Spike Milligan	Remade in the Vintage Goons series as "The Ink Shortage"
23	"The Greatest Mountain in the World"	TLO 50206	1 March 1954	Peter Eton	Spike Milligan	Remade in the Vintage Goons series
24	"The Collapse of the British Railways Sandwich System"	TLO 50546	8 March 1954	Peter Eton	Spike Milligan	Remade in the Vintage Goons series as "The Mustard and Cress Shortage"
25	"The Silent Bugler"	TLO 50871	15 March 1954	Peter Eton	Spike Milligan	Remade in the Vintage Goons series
26	"Western Story"	TLO 51429	22 March 1954	Peter Eton	Spike Milligan	
27	"The Saga of the Internal Mountain"	TLO 51769	29 March 1954	Peter Eton	Spike Milligan	Remade in the Vintage Goons series as "The Internal Mountain"
28	"The Invisible Acrobat"	TLO 52346	5 April 1954	Peter Eton	Spike Milligan	
29	"The Great Bank of England Robbery"	TLO 52585	12 April 1954	Peter Eton	Spike Milligan	Remade in the Vintage Goons series
30	"The Siege of Fort Knight"	TLO 52599	19 April 1954	Peter Eton	Spike Milligan	Remade in the Vintage Goons series
Special	"Archie in Goonland"	TLO 55169	11 June 1954	Roy Speer	Eric Sykes, Spike Milligan	With Peter Brough and Archie Andrews, Hattie Jacques and the BBC Variety Orchestra
Special	"The Starlings"	TNC 408	31 August 1954	Peter Eton	Spike Milligan	

=== Fifth series (1954–55) ===
Cast: Peter Sellers, Harry Secombe, Spike Milligan, with Max Geldray and The Ray Ellington Quartet, orchestra conducted by Wally Stott.
Announcer: Wallace Greenslade
The shows were all broadcast on Tuesdays. All episodes from this and subsequent series survive, though a handful do so only in the form of domestic off-air recordings.

Episodes 1–13 released on The Goon Show Compendium Vol.1; Episodes 14–26 released on The Goon Show Compendium Vol.2

Episode #	Title	Original airdate	Producer	Scriptwriter(s)	Notes
1	"The Whistling Spy Enigma"	28 September 1954	Peter Eton	Spike Milligan	This episode was reperformed in a 1966 television episode of Secombe & Friends
2	"The Lost Gold Mine (of Charlotte)"	5 October 1954	Peter Eton	Spike Milligan	
3	"The Dreaded Batter Pudding Hurler (of Bexhill-on-Sea)"	12 October 1954	Peter Eton	Spike Milligan	
4	"The Phantom Head Shaver (of Brighton)"	19 October 1954	Peter Eton	Spike Milligan	
5	"The Affair of the Lone Banana"	26 October 1954	Peter Eton	Spike Milligan	
6	"The Canal"	2 November 1954	Peter Eton	Spike Milligan	With Valentine Dyall
7	"Lurgi Strikes Britain"	9 November 1954	Peter Eton	Eric Sykes, Spike Milligan	
8	"The Mystery of the Marie [sic] Celeste (Solved!)"	16 November 1954	Peter Eton	Eric Sykes, Spike Milligan	
9	"The Last Tram (from Clapham)"	23 November 1954	Peter Eton	Eric Sykes, Spike Milligan	
10	"The Booted Gorilla (Found?)"	30 November 1954	Peter Eton	Spike Milligan, Eric Sykes	Features Sellers (as Dennis Bloodnok) singing "Any Old Iron", a song he released as a single in 1957 as "Willium Mate" (another character he played in the series)
11	"The Spanish Suitcase"	7 December 1954	Peter Eton	Eric Sykes, Spike Milligan	
12	"Dishonoured (or The Fall of Neddie Seagoon)"	14 December 1954	Peter Eton	Spike Milligan, Eric Sykes	
13	"Forog"	21 December 1954	Peter Eton	Eric Sykes, Spike Milligan	
14	"Ye Bandit of Sherwood Forest"	28 December 1954	Peter Eton	Spike Milligan, Eric Sykes	A Christmas episode featuring Charlotte Mitchell. Several jokes appear to have been reused in the later Christmas episode "Robin Hood"
15	"1985"	4 January 1955	Peter Eton	Spike Milligan, Eric Sykes	Remade later this series
16	"The Case of the Missing Heir"	11 January 1955	Peter Eton	Eric Sykes, Spike Milligan	
17	"China Story"	18 January 1955	Peter Eton	Spike Milligan, Eric Sykes	Remade in 1956
18	"Under Two Floorboards"	25 January 1955	Peter Eton	Eric Sykes, Spike Milligan	
19	"The Missing Scroll"	1 February 1955	Peter Eton	Spike Milligan, Eric Sykes	
20	"1985"	8 February 1955	Peter Eton	Spike Milligan, Eric Sykes	Remake of episode 15, with John Snagge (pre-recorded)
21	"The Sinking of Westminster Pier"	15 February 1955	Peter Eton	Spike Milligan, Eric Sykes	
22	"The Fireball of Milton Street"	22 February 1955	Peter Eton	Spike Milligan, Eric Sykes	
23	"The Six Ingots of Leadenhall Street"	1 March 1955	Peter Eton	Eric Sykes, Spike Milligan	
24	"The Yehti"	8 March 1955	Peter Eton	Eric Sykes, Spike Milligan	
25	"The White Box of Great Bardfield"	15 March 1955	Peter Eton	Spike Milligan, Eric Sykes	
26	"The End (aka Confessions of a Secret Senna Pod Drinker)"	22 March 1955	Peter Eton	Eric Sykes, Spike Milligan	

=== Sixth series (1955–56) ===
Cast: Peter Sellers, Harry Secombe, Spike Milligan, with Max Geldray and The Ray Ellington Quartet, orchestra conducted by Wally Stott.
Announcer: Wallace Greenslade
The shows were all broadcast on Tuesdays.

Episodes 1–6 and 8–14 released on The Goon Show Compendium Vol.3; Episodes 15–17, 19–27 and "China Story" special released on The Goon Show Compendium Vol.4; Episodes 7 and 18 released on The Goon Show Compendium Vol.12

Episode #	Title	Original airdate	Producer	Scriptwriter(s)	Notes
1	"The Man Who Won the War (aka Seagoon MCC)"	20 September 1955	Peter Eton	Spike Milligan, Eric Sykes	
2	"The Secret Escritoire"	27 September 1955	Peter Eton	Spike Milligan, Eric Sykes	
3	"The Lost Emperor"	4 October 1955	Peter Eton	Spike Milligan	
4	"Napoleon's Piano"	11 October 1955	Peter Eton	Spike Milligan	
5	"The Case of the Missing CD Plates"	18 October 1955	Peter Eton	Spike Milligan	
6	"Rommel's Treasure"	25 October 1955	Peter Eton	Spike Milligan	
7	"Foiled by President Fred"	1 November 1955	Peter Eton	Spike Milligan	
8	"Shangri-La Again"	8 November 1955	Peter Eton	Spike Milligan	
9	"The International Christmas Pudding"	15 November 1955	Peter Eton	Spike Milligan	
10	"The Pevensey Bay Disaster"	(22 November 1955)	Peter Eton	Spike Milligan	Recorded 20 November 1955; postponed because of train derailment at Milton; "China Story" repeated instead
11	"The Sale of Manhattan (aka The Lost Colony)"	29 November 1955	Peter Eton	Spike Milligan	
12	"The Terrible Revenge of Fred Fu-Manchu"	6 December 1955	Peter Eton	Spike Milligan	
Special	"The Missing Christmas Parcel – Post Early for Christmas"	8 December 1955	Peter Eton, John Lane	Eric Sykes	
13	"The Lost Year"	13 December 1955	Peter Eton	Spike Milligan	
14	"The Greenslade Story"	20 December 1955	Peter Eton	Spike Milligan	With John Snagge
15	"The Hastings Flyer – Robbed"	27 December 1955	Peter Eton	Spike Milligan	
16	"The Mighty Wurlitzer"	3 January 1956	Peter Eton	Spike Milligan	
17	"The Raid of the International Christmas Pudding"	10 January 1956	Peter Eton	Spike Milligan	
18	"Tales of Montmartre"	17 January 1956	Peter Eton	Spike Milligan, Eric Sykes	With Charlotte Mitchell
19	"The Jet-Propelled Guided NAAFI"	24 January 1956	Peter Eton	Spike Milligan	
20	"The House of Teeth"	31 January 1956	Peter Eton	Spike Milligan	With Valentine Dyall
21	"Tales of Old Dartmoor"	7 February 1956	Peter Eton	Spike Milligan	
22	"The Choking Horror"	14 February 1956	Pat Dixon	Spike Milligan, Larry Stephens	
23	"The Great Tuscan Salami Scandal"	21 February 1956	Pat Dixon	Spike Milligan	With John Snagge (pre-recorded)
24	"The Treasure in the Lake"	28 February 1956	Pat Dixon	Spike Milligan	
Special	"The Goons Hit Wales"	1 March 1956	Unknown	Spike Milligan	
25	"The Fear of Wages"	6 March 1956	Pat Dixon	Spike Milligan, Larry Stephens	
26	"Scradje"	13 March 1956	Pat Dixon	Spike Milligan, Larry Stephens	With John Snagge (pre-recorded)
27	"The Man Who Never Was"	20 March 1956	Pat Dixon	Spike Milligan, Larry Stephens	Remake of series 3 episode 20
10	"The Pevensey Bay Disaster"	3 April 1956	Peter Eton	Spike Milligan	Postponed from 22 November 1955
Special	"China Story"	29 August 1956	Dennis Main Wilson	Spike Milligan, Eric Sykes	Remake of series 5 episode 17

=== Seventh series (1956–57) ===
Cast: Peter Sellers, Harry Secombe, Spike Milligan, with Max Geldray and The Ray Ellington Quartet, orchestra conducted by Wally Stott.
Announcer: Wallace Greenslade
The shows were all broadcast on Thursdays, except episodes 10 and 13, which were on Wednesdays.

Episodes 1–3, 5–12 and "Operation Christmas Duff" special released on The Goon Show Compendium Vol.5; Episodes 14–20, 22–25 and "The Reason Why" special released on The Goon Show Compendium Vol.6; Episodes 4, 13, 21 and "Robin Hood (and His Merry Men)" special released on The Goon Show Compendium Vol.12

Episode #	Title	Original airdate	Producer	Scriptwriter(s)	Notes
1	"The Nasty Affair at the Burami Oasis"	4 October 1956	Peter Eton	Spike Milligan, Larry Stephens	
2	"Drums Along the Mersey"	11 October 1956	Peter Eton	Spike Milligan	With Valentine Dyall
3	"The Great Nadger Plague"	18 October 1956	Pat Dixon	Spike Milligan, Larry Stephens	
4	"The MacReekie Rising of '74"	25 October 1956	Pat Dixon	Spike Milligan, Larry Stephens	Recorded without Milligan, with George Chisholm
5	"The Spectre of Tintagel"	1 November 1956	Pat Dixon	Spike Milligan, Larry Stephens	With Valentine Dyall
6	"The Sleeping Prince"	(8 November 1956)	Pat Dixon	Spike Milligan, Larry Stephens	Planned for broadcast on 8 November 1956 but delayed due to the Hungarian Revolution. It was replaced by a repeat of "The Greenslade Story".
7	"The Great Bank Robbery"	15 November 1956	Pat Dixon	Spike Milligan, Larry Stephens	
8	"Personal Narrative"	22 November 1956	Pat Dixon	Spike Milligan, Larry Stephens	
9	"The Mystery of the Fake Neddie Seagoons"	29 November 1956	Pat Dixon	Spike Milligan, Larry Stephens	
Special	"Robin Hood (and His Merry Men)"	rec. 2 December 1956 broadcast 25 December 1988	Pat Dixon	Spike Milligan, Larry Stephens	A Christmas episode featuring Valentine Dyall and Dennis Price. Also features many repeat jokes from "Ye Bandit of Sherwood Forest" (series 5 episode 14)
10	"What's My Line?"	5 December 1956	Pat Dixon	Spike Milligan, Larry Stephens	
11	"The Telephone"	13 December 1956	Pat Dixon	Spike Milligan, Larry Stephens	
12	"The Flea"	20 December 1956	Pat Dixon	Spike Milligan, Larry Stephens	
Special	"Operation Christmas Duff"	24 December 1956	Pat Dixon	Spike Milligan, Larry Stephens	
13	"Six Charlies in Search of an Author"	26 December 1956	Pat Dixon	Spike Milligan, Larry Stephens	
14	"Emperor of the Universe"	3 January 1957	Pat Dixon	Spike Milligan, Larry Stephens	
15	"Wings Over Dagenham"	10 January 1957	Pat Dixon	Spike Milligan, Larry Stephens	With George Chisholm
16	"The Rent Collectors"	17 January 1957	Pat Dixon	Spike Milligan, Larry Stephens	With Bernard Miles
17	"Shifting Sands"	24 January 1957	Pat Dixon	Spike Milligan, Larry Stephens	With Jack Train
18	"The Moon Show"	31 January 1957	Pat Dixon	Spike Milligan, Larry Stephens	
19	"The Mysterious Punch-up-the-Conker"	7 February 1957	Pat Dixon	Spike Milligan, Larry Stephens	
6	"The Sleeping Prince"	14 February 1957	Pat Dixon	Spike Milligan, Larry Stephens	Postponed from 8 November 1956
20	"Round the World in Eighty Days"	21 February 1957	Pat Dixon	Spike Milligan, Larry Stephens	
21	"Insurance, the White Man's Burden"	28 February 1957	Pat Dixon	Spike Milligan, Larry Stephens	
22	"The Africa Ship Canal"	7 March 1957	Pat Dixon	Spike Milligan, Larry Stephens	
23	"Ill Met by Goonlight"	14 March 1957	Pat Dixon	Spike Milligan	
24	"The Missing Boa Constrictor"	21 March 1957	Pat Dixon	Spike Milligan, Larry Stephens	
25	"The Histories of Pliny the Elder"	28 March 1957	Pat Dixon	Spike Milligan, Larry Stephens	
Special	"The Reason Why"	22 August 1957	Jacques Brown	Spike Milligan	With Valentine Dyall

=== Eighth series (1957–58) ===
Cast: Peter Sellers, Harry Secombe, Spike Milligan, with Max Geldray and The Ray Ellington Quartet, orchestra conducted by Wally Stott.
Announcer: Wallace Greenslade
The shows were all broadcast on Mondays.

Episodes 1–6 and 8–15 released on The Goon Show Compendium Vol.7; Episodes 16–26 released on The Goon Show Compendium Vol.8; Episode 7 released on The Goon Show Compendium Vol.12

Episode #	Title	Original airdate	Producer	Scriptwriter(s)	Notes
1	"Spon"	30 September 1957	Charles Chilton	Spike Milligan	Recorded without Secombe, with Dick Emery
2	"The Junk Affair"	7 October 1957	Charles Chilton	Spike Milligan, Larry Stephens	
3	"The Burning Embassy"	14 October 1957	Charles Chilton	Spike Milligan, Larry Stephens	
4	"The Great Regent's Park Swim"	21 October 1957	Charles Chilton	Spike Milligan, Larry Stephens	
5	"The Treasure in the Tower"	28 October 1957	Charles Chilton	Spike Milligan, Larry Stephens	
6	"The Space Age"	4 November 1957	Roy Speer	Spike Milligan, Larry Stephens	
7	"The Red Fort"	11 November 1957	Roy Speer	Spike Milligan, Larry Stephens	
8	"The Missing Battleship"	18 November 1957	Roy Speer	Spike Milligan, Larry Stephens	Geldray edited from broadcast
9	"The Policy"	25 November 1957	Roy Speer	Larry Stephens	
10	"King Solomon's Mines"	2 December 1957	Roy Speer	Spike Milligan, Larry Stephens	
11	"The Stolen Postman"	9 December 1957	Roy Speer	Larry Stephens	
12	"The Great British Revolution"	16 December 1957	Roy Speer	Spike Milligan, Larry Stephens	Features Sellers portraying Prime Minister Harold MacMillan in the style of Laurence Olivier as Richard III.
13	"The Plasticine Man"	23 December 1957	Roy Speer	Spike Milligan, Larry Stephens	Ellington edited from some broadcast versions
14	"African Incident"	30 December 1957	Roy Speer	Spike Milligan, Larry Stephens	With Cécile Chevreau
15	"The Thing on the Mountain"	6 January 1958	Tom Ronald	Larry Stephens, Maurice Wiltshire	
16	"The String Robberies"	13 January 1958	Tom Ronald	Spike Milligan	With George Chisholm
17	"The Moriarty Murder Mystery"	20 January 1958	Charles Chilton	Larry Stephens, Maurice Wiltshire	
18	"The Curse of Frankenstein"	27 January 1958	Charles Chilton	Spike Milligan	Ellington edited from broadcast, with George Chisholm
19	"The White Neddie Trade"	3 February 1958	Charles Chilton	Larry Stephens, Maurice Wiltshire	
20	"Ten Snowballs that Shook the World"	10 February 1958	Charles Chilton	Spike Milligan	
21	"The Man Who Never Was"	17 February 1958	Charles Chilton	Spike Milligan, Larry Stephens	Remake of series 3 episode 20 and Series 6 Episode 27
22	"_____________ (aka _____________! and World War I)"	24 February 1958	Charles Chilton	Spike Milligan	
23	"The Spon Plague"	3 March 1958	Charles Chilton	John Antrobus, Spike Milligan	With George Chisholm
24	"Tiddlywinks"	10 March 1958	Charles Chilton	Spike Milligan	With John Snagge
25	"The Evils of Bushey Spon"	17 March 1958	Charles Chilton	Spike Milligan	With A. E. Matthews
26	"The Great Statue Debate"	24 March 1958	Charles Chilton	Spike Milligan, John Antrobus	

=== Vintage Goons series (1957–58) ===
Cast: Peter Sellers, Harry Secombe, Spike Milligan, with Max Geldray and The Ray Ellington Quartet, orchestra conducted by Wally Stott.
Announcer: Wallace Greenslade
The following episodes were especially recorded for overseas stations only during the Eighth Series and were re-recordings of earlier episodes. Six of these episodes were broadcast prior to the commencement of the Ninth series, which is why the Ninth series was shorter. However, many of these episodes were not broadcast in the United Kingdom until the 1980s or 1990s. So for contextual purposes, the recording dates are listed alongside the original airdates in the United Kingdom.

All episodes except 3 released on The Goon Show Compendium Vol.9; Episode 3 released on The Goon Show Compendium Vol.12

Episode #	Title	Recorded	Original airdate	Producer	Scriptwriter(s)	Notes
1	"The Mummified Priest"	6 October 1957	22 September 1958	Charles Chilton	Spike Milligan	
2	"The Greatest Mountain in the World"	20 October 1957	29 September 1958	Charles Chilton	Spike Milligan	
3	"The Missing Number 10 Downing Street"	3 November 1957	12 December 2023	Roy Speer	Spike Milligan, Larry Stephens	
4	"The Giant Bombardon"	17 November 1957	6 October 1958	Roy Speer	Spike Milligan	With Valentine Dyall
5	"The Kippered Herring Gang"	1 December 1957	9 April 1994	Roy Speer	Spike Milligan	
6	"The Vanishing Room"	15 December 1957	13 October 1958	Roy Speer	Spike Milligan	
7	"The Ink Shortage"	29 December 1957	8 December 2008	Roy Speer	Spike Milligan	
8	"The Mustard and Cress Shortage"	12 January 1958	17 September 1994	Tom Ronald	Spike Milligan	
9	"The Internal Mountain"	16 February 1958	28 December 1986	Charles Chilton	Spike Milligan	
10	"The Silent Bugler"	23 February 1958	29 December 1986	Charles Chilton	Spike Milligan	
11	"The Great Bank of England Robbery"	2 March 1958	20 October 1958	Charles Chilton	Spike Milligan	
12	"The Dreaded Piano Clubber"	23 March 1958	26 December 1986	Charles Chilton	Spike Milligan	(Note: Different paperwork sources for episodes 12 and 14 of the Vintage Goons series are variously dated 9 March 1958 or 23 March 1958. The rehearsal material for "The Dreaded Piano Clubber" was recorded on the same day as Eighth series episode "The Great Statue Debate", which was 23 March 1958. However, along with "The Albert Memorial", it was issued out of chronological order.)
13	"The Siege of Fort Night"	16 March 1958	27 December 1986	Charles Chilton	Spike Milligan	
14	"The Albert Memorial"	9 March 1958	27 October 1958	Charles Chilton	Spike Milligan	

=== Ninth series (1958–59) ===
Cast: Peter Sellers, Harry Secombe, Spike Milligan, with Max Geldray and The Ray Ellington Quartet, orchestra conducted by Wally Stott.
Announcer: Wallace Greenslade
The shows were all broadcast on Mondays, except episode 12, which was on a Tuesday.

Episodes 1–12 released on The Goon Show Compendium Vol.10; episodes 13–17 released on The Goon Show Compendium Vol.11

Episode #	Title	Original airdate	Producer	Scriptwriter(s)	Notes
1	"The Sahara Desert Statue"	3 November 1958	John Browell	Spike Milligan	
2	"I Was Monty's Treble"	10 November 1958	John Browell	Spike Milligan	
3	"The £1,000,000 Penny"	17 November 1958	John Browell	Spike Milligan	
4	"The Pam's Paper Insurance Policy"	24 November 1958	John Browell	Spike Milligan	
5	"The Mountain Eaters"	1 December 1958	John Browell	Spike Milligan	
6	"The Childe Harolde Rewarde"	8 December 1958	John Browell	Spike Milligan	
7	"The Seagoon Memoirs"	15 December 1958	John Browell	Larry Stephens, Maurice Wiltshire	
8	"Queen Anne's Rain"	22 December 1958	John Browell	Spike Milligan	
9	"The Battle of Spion Kop"	29 December 1958	John Browell	Spike Milligan	
10	"Ned's Atomic Dustbin"	5 January 1959	John Browell	Spike Milligan	With John Snagge (pre-recorded)
11	"Who Is Pink Oboe?"	12 January 1959	John Browell	Spike Milligan	Recorded without Sellers, with Kenneth Connor, Valentine Dyall, Graham Stark, Jack Train and a pre-recorded John Snagge
12	"The Call of the West"	20 January 1959	John Browell	Spike Milligan	
13	"Dishonoured – Again"	26 January 1959	John Browell	Spike Milligan	Remake of "Dishonoured, or The Fall of Neddie Seagoon" (series 5 episode 12)
14	"The Scarlet Capsule"	2 February 1959	John Browell	Spike Milligan	With Andrew Timothy (pre-recorded)
15	"The Tay Bridge"	9 February 1959	John Browell	Spike Milligan	With George Chisholm
16	"The Gold Plate Robbery"	16 February 1959	John Browell	Spike Milligan	
17	"The £50 Cure"	23 February 1959	John Browell	Spike Milligan	Recorded without Secombe, with Kenneth Connor

=== Tenth series (1959–60) ===
Cast: Peter Sellers, Harry Secombe, Spike Milligan, with Max Geldray and The Ray Ellington Quartet, orchestra conducted by Wally Stott.
Announcer: Wallace Greenslade
The shows were all broadcast on Thursdays.

All episodes released on The Goon Show Compendium Vol.11

Episode #	Title	Original airdate	Producer	Scriptwriter(s)	Notes
1	"A Christmas Carol"	24 December 1959	John Browell	Spike Milligan	
2	"The Tale of Men's Shirts"	31 December 1959	John Browell	Spike Milligan	
3	"The Chinese Legs"	7 January 1960	John Browell	Spike Milligan	With John Snagge (pre-recorded)
4	"Robin's Post"	14 January 1960	John Browell	Spike Milligan	
5	"The Silver Doubloons"	21 January 1960	John Browell	Spike Milligan	With Valentine Dyall
6	"The Last Smoking Seagoon"	28 January 1960	John Browell	Spike Milligan	With John Snagge (pre-recorded)

=== Post-1960 specials ===
1. "Tales of Men's Shirts" (8 August 1968; Thames Television)
2. "The Last Goon Show of All" (5 October 1972) (Released on The Goon Show Compendium Vol.12)
3. "Goon Again: The 50th Anniversary Cardboard Replica Goon Show" (29 May 2001)

== Notes and references ==
Notes

== Bibliography ==
- Farnes, Norma (6 November 1997). The Goons: The Story. London: Virgin Books. ISBN 1-85227-679-7.
- Wilmut, Roger; Grafton, Jimmy (1981). The Goon Show Companion – A History and Goonography. London: Robson Books. ISBN 0-903895-64-1.
