= Pat Dixon (producer) =

English radio producer (1904–1958)

Pat Dixon

Patrick "Pat" Kenneth Macneile Dixon (15 June 1904 – 8 October 1958) was an English radio producer for BBC Radio.

== Biography ==
Dixon was born on 15 June 1904; his parents were Professor William Macneile Dixon (1891–1946) and Edith (née Wales, ?–1945). He was educated at Winchester College and Christ Church, Oxford.

Dixon worked for a time as a journalist with the Glasgow Herald, and then in the publicity section of Gaumont British before moving to the advertising agency Mather & Crowther. He joined the BBC in October 1940 as a producer and, in the summer of 1948, produced Listen, My Children, a series which included Harry Secombe and Benny Hill in the cast. At the end of 1948 he produced the radio series Third Division, which was broadcast in early 1949; the shows were written by Frank Muir and Denis Norden and the cast included Secombe, Michael Bentine and Peter Sellers. Bentine noted that Dixon was "scholarly and intelligently humorous ... and as radical in his approach to comedy as we were", while Muir considered him "a terrific chap, and a rebel ... he started all sorts of ideas and shows.

In 1951 Dixon agreed to a request from Spike Milligan to record an audition tape which included Milligan, Sellers, Bentine and Secombe; he passed the tape on to the BBC planners and stressed that a series would be an asset to the corporation. They agreed and Crazy People was produced, which was subsequently re-named The Goon Show, although Dixon was not the producer. Dixon had a further impact on the show as he introduced Max Geldray and Ray Ellington into the format. Towards the end of the sixth series of The Goon Show, the regular producer, Peter Eton, left the show to work on BBC television: Dixon became the show's producer for the remaining six episodes. Dixon was less disciplinarian that Eton in his approach, although there was some friction with Milligan and Eton returned to produce the first two shows of series seven, before Dixon completed the rest of the 25 episode series. His last Goon Show was broadcast on 28 March 1957. During his tenure as Goon Show producer, Dixon came under pressure from the BBC to ensure no overtly political preferences or jokes were in the script; he resented such coercion, and wrote to the Assistant Head of Variety, "I think it is very dangerous to have these subtle encroachments on free speech". Spike Milligan considered that Dixon was, "the only producer ... who knows what the Goon Show is all about".

Dixon worked with Tony Hancock, when he produced the first episode of the fifth series of Hancock's Half Hour, The New Radio Series. He also produced the series Ignorance is Bliss and These Foolish Things. Dixon also worked again with Michael Bentine on the first series of Round the Bend in Thirty Minutes.

He died of cancer on 8 October 1958, aged 54.

== Selected credits ==
- Take It From Here (Radio)
- It's That Man Again (Radio, 1941–44)
- Tom Arnold's Hoop-La! (Radio, 1944–45)
- It's a Pleasure (Radio, 1945)
- Our Shed (Radio, 1946)
- Ignorance is Bliss (Radio, 1947–1949)
- Night Comes too Soon (Film script, 1947)
- Listen, My Children (Radio, 1948)
- Third Division (Radio, 1949)
- The Bradens (Radio, 1950–1956)
- Let's Settle For Music with the Baker's Dozen (Radio, 1952-?)
- In All Directions (Radio, 1952–55)
- Starstruck (Radio, 1955)
- Finkel's Café (Radio, 1956)
- These Foolish Things (Radio, 1956)
- The Goon Show (Radio, 1956–1957)
- Passing Parade (Radio, 1957)
- Round the Bend in Thirty Minutes (1957–58)
- Hancock's Half Hour (Radio, 1958)

== Notes and references ==
Notes

== Bibliography ==
- Carpenter, Humphrey (2004). Spike Milligan. London: Hodder & Stoughton. ISBN 978-0-340-82612-6.
- Secombe, Harry (1997). Arias and Raspberries: An Autobiography. London: Pan Macmillan. ISBN 978-0-330-35463-9.
- Webber, Richard (2011). Fifty Years of Hancock's Half Hour. London: Random House. ISBN 978-1-4464-0998-5.
- Wilmut, Roger; Grafton, Jimmy (1981). The Goon Show Companion: A History and Goonography. London: Robson Books. ISBN 0-903895-64-1.
