= The Fear of Wages =

Episode of The Goon Show

"The Fear of Wages" is an episode of the British radio comedy The Goon Show, written by Spike Milligan and Larry Stephens. As the 25th episode of the sixth series, it was first broadcast on 6 March 1956 and was among the shows first repeated in the 1970s following the success of The Last Goon Show of All in 1972.

Appearing on a 50th anniversary program entitled 'Goons Night' on BBC Radio 2, broadcast on 29 May 2001, Milligan announced this as his favourite episode of The Goon Show.

== Title ==
Like many of The Goon Show titles, it was a parody of a contemporary film, The Wages of Fear (1953). Wallace Greenslade initially announces that title as "Le Salaire de la peur, meaning The Wages of Fear, or in English...". Peter Sellers then announces, as Willium ("Mate"), "The Fear of Wages! Ohhh!".

== Plot ==
The plot is loosely based on the plot of the film, The Wages of Fear; transporting nitroglycerin by trucks.

=== Part one ===
Burma, 6 March 1956: Colonel Neddie Seagoon of the 4th Armoured Thunderboxes reads a telegram that Major Bloodnok failed to show him in 1945 because he thought it was a practical joke. The telegram states that World War II ended in August 1945, which comes as a shock because Seagoon and the others have been fighting the Imperial Japanese Army, now confined to a tree, for the last fourteen years.

Fortunately, however, General Yakamoto emerges from the tree with a white flag, wishing to borrow more ammunition to keep fighting. The British refuse and so the Japanese surrender, voluntarily giving up their supplies: one thousand cans of nitroglycerine and two thousand cans of sake. The ever-degenerate Bloodnok takes command of the sake, leaving Seagoon to telephone the War Office with news of the victory. Naturally, his first attempt is a "wrong number". After intoning a noble speech as he dials and listens to the phone ring, he hears the greeting (in the voice of Willium again), "Battersea Dogs Home, mate!".

=== Part two ===
The scene shifts to the Army Pay Corps, where Chief Cashier Hercules Grytpype-Thynne is blatantly stealing money from the army’s wages and hiding it in a variety of bizarre places, with the help of Moriarty. They receive a telephone call telling them of the miraculous return of the lost regiment. The two thieves are horrified as they have spent all the back pay due to the soldiers. While Moriarty panics and Grytpype ponders the situation, the show goes into its first musical interlude.

Back in Burma, Seagoon informs Bloodnok that Whitehall denies that the regiment's soldiers are alive. The only way to get their back pay is to take the Japanese army, in their tree, back to London. Seagoon announces that they should leave the nitroglycerine behind, but just then Grytpype telephones to say that they won't get paid unless all the supplies are accounted for. That means that someone must drive the truck full of nitroglycerin, which leads to a lengthy discussion. Seagoon refuses and Bloodnok has generously volunteered to drive the truck full of the sake, so Eccles (who appears off a record) is ordered to drive the truck, which quickly explodes. However, Eccles reveals he wasn't really driving the truck, and the unfortunate Bluebottle was asleep in the back.

=== Part three ===
After the second musical interlude, we discover that the truck convoy has been driving back to England for five weeks. Bloodnok has been continually drinking the sake all that time, which worries Seagoon as it means they won't get their back pay. In an aside to the audience, General Yakamoto reveals that he switched the sake with the nitroglycerin.

Meanwhile, Grytpype (aware that his plot to blow up Seagoon and the others has failed) has called a governmental meeting and informs the Chancellor of the Exchequer that the regiment's combined back pay amounts to millions of pounds, which will ruin the country's annual budget. The decision is made to stop the convoy by getting the Japanese to declare war again.

However, the Japanese run out of ammunition again and again are refused to be lent any by the British. However, when Bloodnok tries to cut the tree down, the Japanese reveal they have suddenly got more ammunition (presumably, as Bloodnok suggests, in a Red Cross package from home). Bloodnok and Seagoon jump into the bulletproof driving cab of the truck and continue driving back to England, fighting with the Japanese all the way.

At a British government Cabinet meeting, Grytpype finally concedes and admits that they will probably have to pay the regiment their owed wages. The truck pulls up outside and Seagoon and Bloodnok demand their back pay. In turn, Grytpype demands their supplies, willing to take the sake if not the nitroglycerin. Seagoon and the others tip Bloodnok upside down in an attempt to make him vomit up the sake, but as he really drank the nitroglycerin, he explodes.

The show ends with Bluebottle asking the announcer, Wallace Greenslade to inform the audience that he was not killed in this episode.

== Characters (in order of appearance) ==
- (Colonel) Neddie Seagoon (Harry Secombe)
- Announcer (Wallace Greenslade)
- (Private) Eccles (Spike Milligan)
- Mate (Peter Sellers)
- Date Announcer (Peter Sellers)
- Major Sir Denis Bloodnok (Peter Sellers)
- Unnamed Indian Soldier/Singiz Thing (Spike Milligan)
- Unnamed British Soldier/Throat (Spike Milligan)
- General Yakamoto (Spike Milligan)
- Moriarty (Spike Milligan)
- Chief Cashier Hercules Grytpype-Thynne (Peter Sellers)
- Sergeant Goldberg (Spike Milligan)
- Bluebottle (Peter Sellers)
- “Rhubarbing” Cabinet Members (Peter Sellers, Spike Milligan, the Wally Stott Orchestra)
- “Custarding” Cabinet Member (Harry Secombe)
- Chancellor of the Exchequer Jim Spriggs (Spike Milligan)
- Winston Churchill (Peter Sellers)
- Unnamed Tokyo Governmental Official (Harry Secombe)

While Seagoon begins the story as Bloodnok's commanding officer, in Part 2 he acts as Bloodnok's subordinate, being addressed as "Seagoon" and addressing Bloodnok as "Sir". This is noticeable when the Japanese commander runs out of ammunition for the second time and asks how much he owes the British, at which point Bloodnok tells Seagoon to "play back their account", which turns out to be a gramophone record.

== Musical interludes ==
- Max Geldray - "Side by Side"
- Ray Ellington - "Bubble, Bubble, Bubble (Pink Champagne)" (George Forrest / Robert Wright) in original broadcast, replaced with "Love Me or Leave Me" in a rebroadcast.
