= Peter Eton =

English radio and television producer

Eton at a Goon Show recording

Peter Randolph Eton (28 May 1917 – December 1979) was a producer for BBC radio and television. He was invalided out of the navy after being wounded during the Dunkirk evacuation and joined the BBC.

He worked at the Variety Department of the BBC from 1951 onwards and oversaw a number of radio series, notably The Goon Show.

He died in December 1979, at the age of 62.

== Biography ==
Eton studied art before working as an artist and film art director; he joined the Royal Navy at the outbreak of World War II, but was invalided out after he was injured by shrapnel during the Dunkirk evacuation. Eton joined the BBC in 1941 in the London Transcription Service—a wartime propaganda unit within the BBC—as a producer. After spending time as a features and drama producer, he moved to the Variety Department in 1951.

In 1951 Eton worked with Spike Milligan on Bumblethorpe; Milligan wrote the series with Larry Stephens and Peter Ling, and the cast included Milligan himself, Robert Moreton, Kenneth Connor, Graham Stark, Valentine Dyall, Alfred Marks, Bernard Miles, Eric Barker, Jack Train and Tony Hancock. In the summer of 1952 Eton had pushed within the BBC for a series for Tony Hancock, with the premise of Hancock playing an "estate-agent-cum-bachelor-town-councillor"; a pilot script was commissioned, but the series never materialised. Hancock's biographer John Fisher suggests that Eton was the first person in British broadcasting to use the term "situation comedy", in a memo dated 31 March 1953, suggesting the format as the ideal vehicle for Hancock's comedic style.

In 1952 Eton took over as producer of The Goon Show, a position he held until 1956. He insisted that the Goons rehearsed properly and pushed for better facilities for the show; Spike Milligan noted that "Peter Eton was the one guy that used to beat the shit out of the sound-effects boys to get the right atmosphere." Towards the end of the sixth series of the Goons, Eton left the show to move to television production and his role was taken by Pat Dixon, although he returned to produce the first two shows of Series 7 after friction between Dixon and Milligan. In 1954 he then produced the BBC radio series The Starlings.

Eton was married to Squirrel. He died at his home in Sussex in December 1979, aged 62.

== Selected credits ==
- Picture Parade (Radio, 1946–48)
- This BBC (Radio, 11 November 1947—Special programme to mark the BBC silver jubilee)
- Bumblethorpe (Radio, 1951)
- Meet the Huggetts (Radio, 1953-1957)
- The Goon Show (Radio, 1952–1956)
- The Starlings (Radio, 1954)
- My Wildest Dream (Radio, 1955)
- The Army Game (TV, 1960)
- Bootsie and Snudge (TV, 1960–63)
- Foreign Affairs (TV, 1964)
- Colonel Trumper's Private War (TV, 1961)
- Comedy Four (TV, 1963)
- A Little Big Business (TV, 1963–65)
- Mr. Aitch (TV, 1967)
- Carry On Christmas Specials (TV, 1969 & 1970)
- Quest for Love (Film, 1971)
- Le Petomane (TV, 1979)

== Bibliography ==
- Carpenter, Humphrey (2004). Spike Milligan. London: Hodder & Stoughton. ISBN 978-0-3408-2612-6.
- Took, Barry (1981). Laughter in the Air: An informal history of British radio comedy. London: Robson Books. ISBN 0-563-17197-9.
- Webber, Richard (2011). Fifty Years of Hancock's Half Hour. London: Random House. ISBN 9781-4-4640-998-5.
- Fisher, John (2008). Tony Hancock. The Definitive Biography. London: HarperCollins. ISBN 978-0 00-726677-7.
- Wilmut, Roger; Grafton, Jimmy (1981). The Goon Show Companion: A History and Goonography. London: Robson Books. ISBN 0903895641.
