= Mighty Wurlitzer =

Mighty Wurlitzer may refer to:

- Mighty Wurlitzer, a line of theater organs made by Wurlitzer
- Mighty Wurlitzer, a metaphor for CIA influence on public opinion
- "The Mighty Wurlitzer", a series 6 episode of BBC Radio comedy The Goon Show
