= The Last Goon Show of All =

- Genre: Comedy
- Running time: 30 minutes
- Country of origin: United Kingdom
- Language: English
- Home station: BBC Radio 4
- TV adaptations: Simulcast on BBC 2
- Starring: Spike Milligan; Peter Sellers; Harry Secombe; Ray Ellington; Max Geldray; Andrew Timothy
- Created by: Spike Milligan
- Written by: Spike Milligan
- Produced by: John Browell
- Narrated by: Andrew Timothy
- Recording studio: Camden Theatre, London
- Original release: 5 October – 5 October 1972
- No. of episodes: Special edition
- Opening theme: "Alte Kameraden"
- Ending theme: "Ding-Dong! The Witch Is Dead"

The Last Goon Show of All is a special edition of the BBC Radio comedy programme The Goon Show commissioned as part of the celebrations of the 50th anniversary of the BBC. Simulcast on radio and television on 5 October 1972, the performance reunited Spike Milligan, Peter Sellers and Harry Secombe as well as other contributors to the programme's original run. It was later released as a long-playing record and on compact disc. The video recording of the television broadcast was also released on VHS and later on DVD, although with some omissions. In early October 2007, 35 years after the original broadcast, a full unedited version was broadcast on BBC 7 (now BBC Radio 4 Extra), the digital radio channel dedicated to repeats of classic shows.

== Introduction ==
Different versions of the show could be heard in different contexts. The television broadcast began with pre-show announcements by the producer, John Browell, and introduction of the participants, followed by warm-up routines by the cast. The broadcast begins with Spike Milligan, Peter Sellers and Harry Secombe each trying and failing to lead the other two in saying "It's great to be back." This was the start of the show from the radio audience's point of view. Announcer Andrew Timothy then intervenes with "They haven't quite got the hang of it yet, but after another smoke they should be switched on."

From there the show re-caps the cast introductions with typically skewed humour. There is a spoof "warm-up" where Sellers, using a "dramatic voice" announces that the best way to warm up an audience is to have the gentlemen squeeze the thigh of the lady sitting next to them.

Timothy then announces that, since the Queen is not available, Secombe has donned a "floral cretonne frock" and stepped in for her at the last minute. Secombe then attempts to "start the show" which sounds a lot like starting, or rather failing to start, a car. This play on words was used by Milligan in his other scripts, particularly the contemporaneous "Milligna Show". The tone of the whole show, in fact, was much more like Milligan's then-current writing than any of the original shows. Although all the stock characters put in an appearance, the humour consists mostly of one-liners.

Secombe eventually starts the show with the help of "a Constabule (sic) of Olde England played by an aging Peter Sellers" who points out that the show has no jokes in the "fuel tonk". Again, humorous typographical errors were a staple of Milligan's writing at the time. For this interlude, Sellers used his impression of Michael Caine, complete with the catchphrase "There's not many people know that!" This is a reference to Caine's supposed fondness for telling people obscure facts. Secombe then shouts in some old jokes and "starts" the show.

Before the "plot" begins, there is a musical interlude in which Ray Ellington performs a very upbeat version of "The Tennessee Waltz". Ellington is introduced by Timothy as "Mrs Dale's last husband". There is also a reference to Eric Sykes, a fellow comedy actor, who co-wrote episodes of The Goon Show with Milligan. Present in the audience was Princess Anne (now Princess Royal), whose brother Prince Charles was famously known to be a fan of the Goons. A joke telegram from him was read out by Andrew Timothy apologising for his absence.

== Plot ==
Andrew Timothy takes us to the Westminster City Council Rubbish Dump, situated in Hyde Park, where Hercules Grytpype-Thynne and Count Jim Moriarty, more ragged than ever, are starving. The Council has just dumped a huge amount of lagging, because "it was in feet and inches, and we have gone metric". Secombe, now in character as Neddie Seagoon, arrives "driving an unlicensed Goon Show with CD plates on". Grytpype's comment is "Yes, it does look a bit seedy, doesn't it." The two villains then attempt their usual swindle of Neddie, in this case convincing him that his legs must be lagged to keep them warm for the coming winter, the payment being his "war gratuity" of one hundred pounds.

However, when Seagoon lifts his trouser leg, it is revealed that Bluebottle has been hiding inside, and is threatening to release pictures of Neddie's bloomers unless he is given money he will use to impress his schoolyard paramour, Mollie Quotts. Bereft of all cash, Seagoon decides to head for Blackpool to earn some money doing his old stage act, the "shaving routine", which was Secombe's own stock-in-trade.

Seagoon then fades away, Timothy dismissing him with "Mr. Secombe's departure is a timely one. Any departure of his is timely." Timothy then introduces Max Geldray as follows: "Just before this show started, Mr. Max Geldray died. His wife described his condition as: satisfactory." Geldray then plays "The Carioca" with the orchestra, and Ellington on conga drums.

After the interlude, Timothy announces that "Seagoon is hauling his huge bloated Welsh body up the M1 to Blackpool, and all lanes are blocked." The show moves to the home of Henry Crun and Minnie Bannister for a typical exchange between the two old fossils, with no consequence to the plot other than to link to the entrance of Major Bloodnok, who is being pursued by the Red Bladder, played as always by Ray Ellington. After an exchange of empty threats with the Bladder, Bloodnok is told by his Indian aide, Singhiz Thing (Milligan), that it is "time for [his] perversion". There follows an interlude of bizarre and suggestive sound effects overlaid with ecstatic yelps from Bloodnok, although this could be more of a satire on the kind of lascivious roles Peter Sellers played in several of his films up to that point. Bloodnok then sends Seagoon to the cellar to rest, this serving to re-introduce Eccles to the audience.

Eccles has been in the cellar since he delivered coal and forgot to let go of the sack. He has been eating coke to survive and letting his nephew, Little Jim, live in his boot. The encounter of Seagoon and Eccles produces what may be the quintessential Eccles quote:

Seagoon: What are you doing down here?
Eccles: Everybody's gotta be somewhere!

The philosophical appeal of this was not lost on the audience, who responded with slow-building but long-lasting laughter.

Neddie eventually falls asleep, setting the stage for Bluebottle to re-emerge from his bloomers and thus begin a conversation with Eccles. This section ends with Bluebottle persuading Eccles to help him push Seagoon down a well, which naturally leads to Little Jim's catchphrase "He's fallen in the water!" During the subsequent audience applause, Milligan shouts "Had to get it in, folks! Had to get it in!"

Bloodnok reappears, pursued by the Red Bladder, but mysteriously transforms into Grytpype-Thynne, who announces to Neddie that "we have found Goon Show number 1-6-3, in which you play the lead all the way through as an underfloor heating detective". Unfortunately, or perhaps fortunately, this line falls victim to one of Sellers' "fluffs", for which he was notorious, followed by an attack of giggling, another one of his trademarks. After some asides by his castmates, he delivers the line, which plays into a risqué reference to former Goon Michael Bentine. Neddie is then nailed under floorboards for his role, and left there for some months.

In fact, he is under the floor of a dressing-room at the Palace Theatre, Blackpool, and this room is given to Bluebottle to prepare for his appearance with "Capt. Goatcabin's Balancing Stallions". He hears Neddie's cries for help, then sees his belly through a knot-hole. The show ends with him poking Neddie in the stomach, as a cacophony of pre-recorded lines from previous parts of the show rise up, followed by a recording of an explosion, a common end to a Goon Show.

Andrew Timothy finishes the show with "The next Goon Show will be on July 7th, 1982. And from Goon Show number 167, farewell. P.S.: Forever". The orchestra plays the signature tune, as Andrew Timothy announces the credits, then moves into "Ding-Dong! The Witch Is Dead", the regular play-out for the show.

In the full recording broadcast on BBC 7, the cast are then heard saying their thank-you's to the audience, with Milligan coming close to abusing them, again something for which he was known in the years after The Goon Show. There follow some minutes of silence after this, then a dirty limerick can be heard, recited by Sellers and accompanied by laughter from Secombe and Milligan.

== Credits ==
- Performers
  - Harry Secombe, Peter Sellers, Spike Milligan
- Musicians
  - The Ray Ellington Quartet, including Judd Proctor (guitar) and Dick Katz (piano).
  - Max Geldray, jazz harmonica player.
  - The Wally Stott Orchestra, conducted by Peter Knight.
- Announcer Andrew Timothy.
- Writer Spike Milligan.
- Producer John Browell.

== Cuts and edits ==
- Spike Milligan's contribution to the pre-show warm-up was cut to a minimum in the TV broadcast and on the vinyl release. Only in the BBC 7 broadcast is his parody of "I Left My Heart In San Francisco" heard.
- The script referred to then-Prime Minister Edward Heath, as "Grocer" Heath, a sobriquet invented by the satirical magazine Private Eye. This was heard during the TV broadcast but the word "Grocer" was cut for the vinyl release. It was left intact in the BBC 7 broadcast.
- Sellers' line ending with "underfloor heating detective" leads to the following scripted exchange:

Seagoon: I've always wanted big parts!
Grytpype: You've always had them Neddie, you and Bentine!

This was cut from the original television and radio broadcast, but left untouched in other versions. Kept in on all versions however, is Sellers messing up the line, first saying "Underfloor Eating Defective", then with Milligan looking at him, Sellers says "I'd like to say that again....", To which all three burst out laughing and Spike adding "The car's outside ready Peter".....

- Andrew Timothy's winding up of the show is heard as ending with "...farewell, P.S. forever" in the BBC 7 broadcast. "P.S. forever" was cut from all other versions.
- The VHS, and subsequent DVD release (which is verbatim the VHS release) lasts 40 minutes. However, the live telecast, and subsequent LP release were longer. The CD release is faithful to the LP release, with a total running time of about 52 minutes. In editing the VHS release down to 40 minutes, the lead-up to a delayed punch-line is lost. The punch line comprises Bluebottle asking Moriarty: "...what is that lump on your nut?", to which Moriarty replies: "That is the difference between margarine". The primer for this punch-line was edited out between announcer Andrew Timothy's follow-on at the end of Ray Ellington's song, and the part where Neddy drives up on an unlicensed Goon Show. Amongst the banter, Grytpype-Thynne tells Moriarty to place his head on an anvil, followed by a clang, and screams of pain from Moriarty. Grytpype then says: "now, taste this margarine". Moriarty complies. Grytpype says: "There. Can you tell the difference?". Moriarty: "No". Grytpype (triumphantly): "You see! You can't tell the difference between a lump on the head and margarine. The leadership of the Conservative Party is yours for the asking!"

"Lead-up to margarine-lump punchline" (1974[LP] / 1994[CD])
30 second sample from "The Last Goon Show of All".

In his Technical Notes for The Goon Show Compendium Volume Twelve (2016), remastering engineer Ted Kendall describes how he and Dirk Maggs decided to produce a 25th Anniversary "restored" version of the programme in 1997 by selecting material from all of the available sources. These included the BBC Transcription Services multitrack tapes which also contained rehearsal material. For the Compendium, Kendall remastered the 1997 version and, in his words, removed some rough edges.

== Topical jokes ==
As with the original series, references to contemporary events are heard in the show, and with the passage of time the significance of the references has faded. For instance, at one point Neddie declares that he must get Bluebottle's photographs back "before Bryan Forbes turns them into a novelty!" This was a reference to the recently published first novel (The Distant Laughter) by the film director Forbes. The novel had been received with derision in certain quarters, particularly in Private Eye.

There are other references to Private Eye and its humour to be heard. At the time the magazine was celebrating its tenth anniversary. During the warm up, Secombe jokes that he is broadcasting "live via satellite from Neasden", a reference to the all-purpose urban location used in Private Eye's parodies and fake news articles.

A joke is made about "us directors of Harlech TV" by Harry Secombe. He was a company director of the erstwhile ITV franchise contractor at the time. Actors Richard Burton and his wife Elizabeth Taylor were also directors.

== Reviews ==
The British press celebrated the event more for its historic significance than the actual content of the show. There was extensive reporting of the pre- and post- show publicity including interviews with the participants. Since Sellers was by then an internationally known film star, and Secombe had become a regular performer in other contexts, such as his appearance as Mr. Bumble in the film of Oliver!, the Lionel Bart musical, there was much public interest even among those unfamiliar with the original show. The sleeve notes for the LP release quote newspaper articles, including one from The Guardian headlined "Goons Reithed in Glory":

Fifty years of nation speaking peace unto nation. Fifty years of Reith, Normanbrook, Hill and Alvar Lidell and how does the British Broadcasting Corporation celebrate the occasion? Answer: with a maniac cackle. It showed a fitting sense of history. The Goons, after all, were the fathers of the great national in-joke and a private language.
