= Max Geldray =

Dutch jazz harmonica player (1916–2004)

Max Geldray

Max van Gelder (12 February 1916 – 2 October 2004), professionally known as Max Geldray, was a Dutch harmonica player. Best known for providing musical interludes for the BBC radio comedy programme The Goon Show, he was also credited as being the first harmonica player to embrace jazz.

Geldray was born in the Netherlands and played jazz in the United Kingdom, Belgium, France and his home country, before settling in Britain at the outbreak of the Second World War; he was wounded during the Invasion of Normandy. He appeared in nearly every episode of The Goon Show from 1951 until the end of the show's run in 1960, providing one of the musical interludes and the closing music for each programme, as well as sometimes taking brief speaking roles. After The Goon Show series ended, Geldray settled in the US, where he worked as an entertainer in the Reno casinos alongside performers such as Sarah Vaughan and Billy Daniels. Moving to Palm Springs, he eventually became a part-time counsellor at the Betty Ford Center. He was married twice and had one son. Geldray died in October 2004, aged 88.

== Early life (1916–46) ==
Geldray was born Max Leon van Gelder, on 12 February 1916 in Amsterdam, Netherlands, to Jewish parents. His father, Leon van Gelder, was a commercial traveller, and his mother was Margarite, née Baillosterky. By 1922, Leon was the European Manager for Maja perfume and the family moved out of Amsterdam to Bilthoven. Both parents could play the piano—Leon was self-taught and played by ear, while Margarite was classically trained—and it was Leon who started to teach Geldray how to play. He developed love of jazz music after hearing Louis Armstrong on the radio in 1928; Geldray later wrote "how could anyone not love its energy, its vitality and the freedom of its form? And Louis Armstrong among all the players, became something special to me".

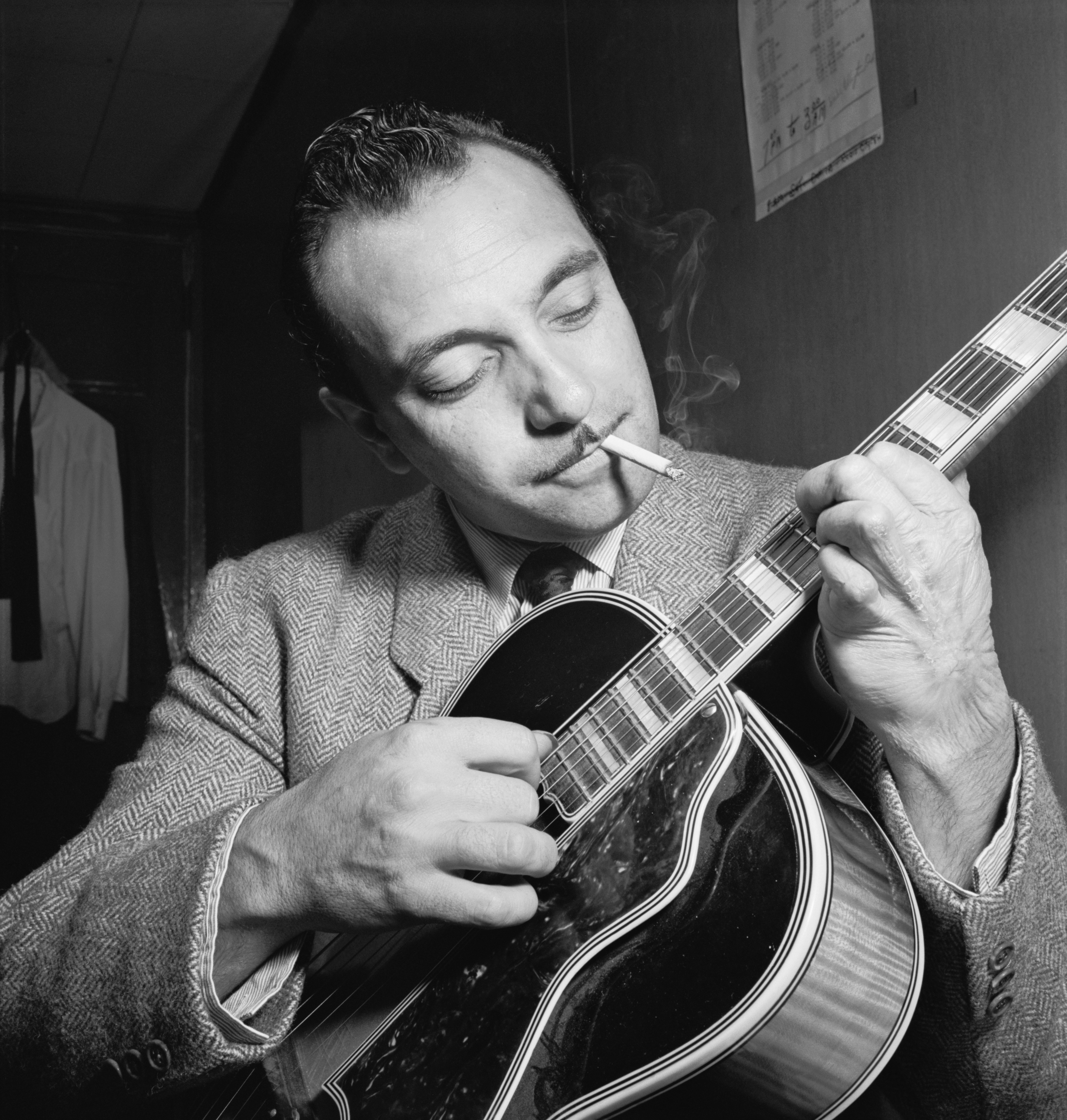
Django Reinhardt, friend and playing companion of Geldray

In February 1930, Geldray heard a mouth organ played on BBC Radio and mentioned the performance to a friend, Hans Mossel, owner of a music shop in Amsterdam; Mossel had ordered a chromatic harmonica the previous week and gave it to Geldray, who practised assiduously. By 1934, Geldray had made some appearances on Dutch radio and formed a band with eight others; an agent named Franklin billed the group as "Mac [sic] Geldray and his Mouth Accordion Band", changing the surname of the principal to the name he retained for the rest of his life. With his performances, Geldray became the first person to play the harmonica in the jazz style. A change in the format of the band to a quartet and the introduction of a new manager led to a six-week tour of English theatres in 1937, accompanying the comedian Tom Moss; the band changed its name to "The Hollander Boys". During the tour, Moss introduced Geldray to Jack Hylton, who invited him to play in his orchestra for the evening.

On his return to the Netherlands, the harmonica band broke up and Geldray travelled alone to Brussels, where he found work playing with the dance orchestra at the club Le Boeuf sur le Toit, where he remained for a year. He then worked with a dance band in The Hague, before joining the house band at the Ostend Casino, the Johnny Fresno Band . He would meet performers who were booked to play the casino on occasion, including saxophonist Coleman Hawkins, the English bandleader Ambrose and French bandleader Ray Ventura. Ventura soon offered Geldray a job and in 1937 Geldray moved to Paris. While in Paris, he went to the Hot Club de France and played with jazz guitarist Django Reinhardt, a musician about whom Geldray asserted, "I can honestly say that I have never heard anyone better". The two became close friends and played together often. With the invasion of France by German forces in early 1940, Geldray travelled to England as a Engelandvaarder, where he realised he would be safer. On 20 September 1940, he joined the Royal Netherlands Motorized Infantry Brigade, part of the Dutch army exiled in England. (Note: On 26 August 1941 the Royal Netherlands Motorized Infantry Brigade received the title "Prinses Irene Brigade", in honour of Princess Irene of the Netherlands, the daughter of Queen Juliana and Prince Bernhard of the Netherlands.) During the war he continued to play and appeared on BBC Radio. In 1942 he was part of the entertainment laid on for Princess Elizabeth's sixteenth birthday at Windsor Castle. During the course of 1942, Geldray also met Sarah Prentice, a 26-year-old Scottish variety artiste, whose professional name was Zaza Peters; the couple married on 18 January 1943.

Geldray took part in the Normandy landings with the Prinses Irene Brigade, but was injured by a bomb blast and spent time in a military hospital. Although he did not incur long-term injuries, he suffered from recurring nightmares in the following years. After the liberation of Amsterdam, Geldray travelled to the city to find his parents who had been resident when the Germans invaded. He found that both parents and his sister Xaviere had been killed in a concentration camp by the Nazis. At the end of the war, Geldray returned to Paris and once again found work with Ray Ventura's orchestra for two years, before returning to London in 1947.

== BBC years (1947–61) ==
Peter Sellers (top), with Spike Milligan (left) and Harry Secombe (right) in The Goon Show

Settling in London, Geldray took up British citizenship, and worked on a number of BBC radio programmes, such as Workers' Playtime, Melody Magazine and Forces' All-Star Bill. In 1951, he provided the musical interludes for a new BBC series Crazy People, a comedy show that starred Harry Secombe, Peter Sellers, Spike Milligan, and Michael Bentine. Crazy People changed its name for subsequent series to The Goon Show and Geldray was a regular performer in the remaining nine series. The show followed a successful format of a vague plot interspersed by two musical performances; the BBC used the same structure for several radio series. In The Goon Show, the musical segments were taken up by Geldray and The Ray Ellington Quartet, with Geldray also playing "Crazy Rhythm" for the play-out music. On occasion, Geldray was given brief lines to perform, although he felt uncomfortable doing so, and his lack of acting ability became a running gag on the programme. Geldray was also the butt of some of the Goon jokes and humour: he was referred to throughout the programmes as "Conks", on account of his nose, and his performances were often humorously dismissed by the announcer Wallace Greenslade, with such comments as: "That was Mr Max Geldray playing a harmonica. We thought you ought to know what it was, anyhow."

In the early 1950s, Geldray's marriage ended in divorce, after the relationship had "burned itself out", and he began a relationship with a dancer, Barbara. In 1956, Geldray appeared in three television comedy shows produced by ITV and starring the Goons: The Idiot Weekly, Price 2d (broadcast 24 February – 23 April 1956), A Show Called Fred (broadcast 2–30 May 1956) and Son of Fred (broadcast 17 September – 5 November 1956). In 1957, he released an album, Goon with the Wind, which was produced by George Martin and released on the Parlophone label. Later that year, Geldray also appeared in Hancock's 43 Minutes, the Christmas edition of Hancock's Half Hour, broadcast on 23 December 1957. In 1958, the BBC proposed dropping Geldray from The Goon Show in a cost-cutting measure; Peter Sellers threatened to leave the series, and Geldray remained.

The Goon Show finished its ten-series run on 28 January 1960. In 1961, with his six-year relationship with Barbara at an end, Geldray worked as an entertainer on four trips on the RMS Queen Elizabeth. On visiting Los Angeles he was impressed by the city and decided to emigrate to the US.

== Moving to the US (1961–2004) ==
Geldray worked in the casinos of Reno, appearing with Sarah Vaughan and Billy Daniels; he did not like the city, so returned to Los Angeles. In 1962, he met a divorcee with three children, Susan Donofrio; the couple married that year, and in 1964 they had a son, Philip. Geldray worked for a period as a sales assistant in a clothes shop before becoming the regional sales supervisor for The Christian Science Monitor.

In 1972, Geldray returned to the UK to appear in The Last Goon Show of All, a special programme recorded on 30 April and broadcast on 5 October 1972 to mark the 50th anniversary of the BBC. When the BBC refused to pay to fly Geldray from the US, two of the show's cast—Spike Milligan and Peter Sellers—contributed to his expenses. After the performance, at the Camden Theatre, Princess Margaret came backstage and asked if she could be introduced to Geldray because she was an admirer of his playing.

In 1973, Geldray and his family moved to Palm Springs to look after his ailing stepfather; he also played harmonica in the local Trinidad Bar. A local doctor approached him after one set and asked if Geldray would put on a show at his stroke centre, which led to Geldray undertaking voluntary work teaching stroke victims to play the harmonica. Following the death of Geldray's youngest step-son, Timmy, Susan Geldray began drinking to excess, and she underwent treatment at the Betty Ford Center. Geldray volunteered to help at the clinic and qualified as a counsellor and technician. To raise funds for the clinic he started "Jazz without Booze", a series of concerts, which included prominent local musicians, including Stan Getz. In 1989, Geldray published his autobiography, Goon With the Wind, using the same title as he had for his 1957 album.

Geldray died in Palm Springs of natural causes on 2 October 2004 at the age of 88.

== Notes and references ==
Notes

== Bibliography ==
- Carpenter, Humphrey (2004). Spike Milligan. London: Hodder & Stoughton. ISBN 978-0-340-82612-6.
- Farnes, Norma (6 November 1997). The Goons: The Story. London: Virgin Books. ISBN 1-85227-679-7.
- Geldray, Max (1989). Goon with the Wind. London: Robson Books. ISBN 978-0-86051-578-4.
- Larkin, Colin (1998). The Virgin Encyclopedia of Fifties Music. London: Virgin Books. ISBN 978-0-7535-0268-6.
- Rigelsford, Adrian (2004). Peter Sellers: A Life in Character. London: Virgin Books. ISBN 978-0-7535-0270-9.
- Thomas, Nigel (1991). Foreign Volunteers of the Allied Forces 1939–45. Oxford: Osprey Publishing. ISBN 978-1-85532-136-6.
- Webber, Richard (2005). Fifty years of Hancock's half hour. London: Arrow Books. ISBN 978-1-4464-0998-5.
- Wilmut, Roger; Grafton, Jimmy (1981). The Goon Show Companion: A History and Goonography. London: Robson Books. ISBN 0-903895-64-1.
