= The Two Charleys =

1959 British TV comedy series

- Genre: Comedy
- Written by: Sheila Hodgson; Allan Prior
- Starring: Charlie Chester; Eleanor Summerfield
- Country of origin: United Kingdom
- Original language: English
- No. of series: 1
- No. of episodes: 6

Production
- Producer: Dennis Main-Wilson
- Running time: 30 minutes
- Production company: BBC

Original release
- Network: BBC One
- Release: 8 April – 13 May 1959

The Two Charleys is a comedy television series that originally aired on the BBC in 1959.

== Cast ==
=== Main ===
- Charlie Chester as Charlie Charles
- Eleanor Summerfield as Ethel Charles

=== Other ===
- Hugh Paddick as Lionel Stone
- Polly Adams as Jessie
- June Cunningham as Belle
- Peggy Ann Clifford as Violet
- Danny Green as Sidney
- Wally Patch as Television mechanic
- Frederick Piper as Mr. Ford-Hunter-Ford
- Max Bacon as Syd Lomax
- Rita Webb as Mother
- Jennifer Phipps as Marigold
- Arnold Marlé as Blink

== Bibliography ==
- Lawrence Goldman. Oxford Dictionary of National Biography 2005–2008. OUP Oxford, 2013.
