= The Green Eye of the Yellow God =

1911 English poem

The Green Eye of the Yellow God, a 1911 poem by J. Milton Hayes, is a famous example of the genre of "dramatic monologue", a music hall staple in the early twentieth century. (Note: The Green Eye of the Yellow God is the title under which it was first published, and repeatedly performed by the actor Bransby Williams (Hayes & Clarke, 1911). It is now often referred to as The Green Eye of the Little Yellow God.) The piece was written for and performed by actor and monologist Bransby Williams. It has often been misattributed to Rudyard Kipling, who classed its author as being among his many imitators, and often parodied, most famously by Billy Bennett as The Green Tie on the Little Yellow Dog.

The opening lines are still very well known:

There's a one-eyed yellow idol to the north of Khatmandu,
There's a little marble cross below the town;
There's a broken-hearted woman tends the grave of Mad Carew,
And the Yellow God forever gazes down.

It is set in Nepal ("to the north of" Kathmandu), and tells the tale of a wild young officer known as "Mad Carew", who steals the "green eye" of a "yellow god" (presumably an emerald in a gold statue) in order to impress his beloved. He is wounded in the course of the robbery, and later murdered, presumably by a devotee of the god for the theft, who returns the jewel to the idol.

== Hayes's account ==
In his book My Brother Evelyn and Other Profiles, Alec Waugh gives Hayes's account of the writing of the poem:

I wrote The Green Eye of the Little Yellow God in five hours, but I had it all planned out. It isn't poetry and it does not pretend to be, but it does what it sets out to do. It appeals to the imagination from the start: those colours, green and yellow, create an atmosphere. Then India, everyone has his own idea of India. Don't tell the public too much. Strike chords. It is no use describing a house; the reader will fix the scene in some spot he knows himself. All you've got to say is 'India' and a man sees something. Then play on his susceptibilities.

His name was Mad Carew. You've got the whole man there. The public will fill in the picture for you. And then the mystery. Leave enough unsaid to make paterfamilias pat himself on the back. 'I've spotted it, he can't fool me. I'm up to that dodge. I know where he went.' No need to explain. Then that final ending where you began. It carries people back. You've got a compact whole. 'A broken-hearted woman tends the grave of Mad Carew.' They'll weave a whole story round that woman's life. Every man's a novelist at heart. We all tell ourselves stories. That's what you've got to play on.

== Location ==
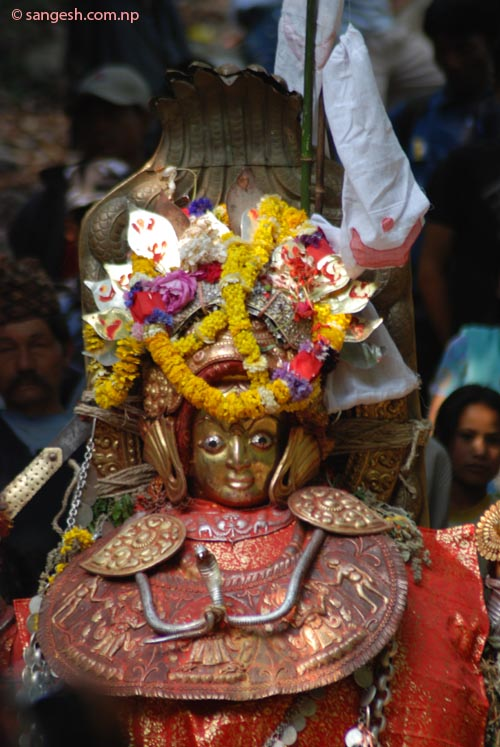
Bajrayogini Temple

Hayes was inaccurate in the conflation of Nepal with India. While Britain achieved colonial control of India between 1858 and 1947, it never did so over Nepal. The political and military agreements between the two countries were therefore quite different. Any British officer in Nepal on official business at the time might have belonged to one of the Gurkha regiments, which recruited from Nepal. However, beyond the statement that "he was worshipped in the ranks" we are told little about Mad Carew's military background. He may have simply been on cross-border leave from India.

In December 2011, the BBC radio programme From Our Own Correspondent broadcast a piece by journalist Joanna Jolly in which she detailed a trip she made to Sankhu, a village to the north-east of Kathmandu. On a hill near the village is the Bajrayogini Temple in which there is a gold-plated statue of the Tantric goddess Bajrayogini, who is worshipped by Hindus and Buddhists. In the Newar community the goddess is called Mhasu Khwa Maju (Yellow Faced Mother Goddess). The statue has silver eyes which are only put in during festivals. Although there is no evidence that Hayes ever visited the area, the temple is mentioned in written sources dating back at least 200 years, so it is entirely plausible that he could have heard stories of this statue and the unusual practices regarding its eyes from returning colonial military personnel and wove these elements into his dramatic monologue.

== References in popular culture ==
In the episode "Stage Struck" of the ITV sitcom Rising Damp, the character Rupert Rigsby (played by Leonard Rossiter) begins reciting the poem to impress Peter Bowles's character Hilary, who throws him out of the room whilst he is still reciting it, only for Rigsby to barge back in babbling about Mad Carew, to finally be slung out again.

Charles Laughton and Vivien Leigh recite this poem in the film Sidewalks of London, also known as St. Martins Lane (1938). The quote also is referenced in the 2007 Cast album of the film's adaptation, Busker Alley in the "Busker Medley".

A music hall sketch named "Me'em Sahib" features a performer trying to recite this, and keeps getting heckled by two British colonial officers sitting in a box seat, who have just returned and "update" him on the circumstances.

In an episode of Upstairs, Downstairs, Mr. Hudson recites the opening lines at a seaside holiday outing by the staff of 165 Eaton Place on the last day of peace before World War I began.

In the episode "The Fear of Wages" of the long-running radio comedy The Goon Show, characters trying to come up with excuses frequently answer along the lines of; "Well, it's a long story. You see...", and then quoting the opening lines (or variations) of the poem dramatically. In "The Shifting Sands", Bloodnok distorts it again, with "There's a little green-eyed idol to the north of Kathmandu... but the wind blew up the chimney just the same".

John Lennon uses the opening line in the posthumously released song "Nobody Told Me" (changing "one-eyed" to "little").

In Doctor Who, the Doctor uses the opening lines on regaining consciousness in the 4th Doctor story "The Talons of Weng-Chiang", although he misattributes them to music hall comic Harry Champion.

Carter the Unstoppable Sex Machine use part of the opening in their song "Perfect Day to Drop the Bomb", which starts "To the north of Kathmandu there's tiny children sniffing glue".

The poem is parodied in Series 2 of Danger Mouse in the episode "Bad Luck Eye of the Little Yellow God."

Tony Randall reads the poem on the episode of The Muppet Show on which he guest stars.

In an episode of the BBC sitcom Kiss Me Kate, the character Craig Chapman played by Darren Boyd begins reciting the poem with actions, but is prevented from completing it when Chris Langham's Douglas Cameron character refuses to cooperate.

Steptoe and Son actor Harry H. Corbett used this poem as the B-side to his 1963 Pye Records release "Like The Big Guys Do".

In I'm Sorry, I'll Read That Again the spoof serial "Curse of the Flying Wombat" is based on the search for the "Green eye of the little yellow dog" in Kathmandu.

In an episode of Duty Free, the British couples enter a talent contest in their hotel. One of their number attempts to recite the poem to the non-English speaking audience, who mistake his earnest performance for a comedy routine. Their laughter is unappreciated, making him retort: "It's not funny! The poor bugger's dead!"

Biggles and the Little Green God (1969) has Biggles seeking a jade statuette believed by South American Indians to be the god Ata-Hua. The poem is directly referenced at the start of the book and occasionally thereafter.

The poem also has a number of references in the 1986 computer game Dizzy - The Ultimate Cartoon Adventure in which various lines of the poem are displayed in banners, where they serve as cryptic clues as to how to solve certain puzzles.

In "The Adventure of the Six Maledictions" by Kim Newman, Mad Carew flees to England with the emerald, pursued by the yellow god's devotees, and turns to the criminal mastermind Professor Moriarty for protection. The story was first published in Gaslight Arcanum, and was subsequently collected with Newman's other Moriarty crossover stories in Professor Moriarty: The Hound of the D'Urbervilles.

In the Masterpiece Theater production of "My Mother and Other Strangers," most of the poem is wonderfully performed in Episode 3.

In the video game VVVVVV, one of the room titles is "The Tomb of Mad Carew."

In her autobiographical book, Moving Mountains, Claire Bertschinger mentions having memorized this poem.

In the novel A Quiet Life In The Country, a Lady Hardcastle Cozy Mystery by T.E. Kinsey, the inspiration of the poem was thanks to Lady Hardcastle solving a murder mystery. "What a story. A golden idol, its shining green eye... I met a bloke once up North. Milton, his name was, Milton Hayes. He writes poems and that. He'd love this one. I might write to him and tell him the story. Might have to embellish it a bit – make it a bit more melodramatic – but it's got promise."

In his comic The Far Side, Gary Larson referenced this poem for a panel published on 2/21/1988.

In the eighth episode of season two in the comedy series Mind Your Language, Ali Nadeem and Ranjit Singh recite a line of the poem with comedic fervour.
