= Milligna (or Your Favourite Spike) =

Radio comedy sketch show

- Other names: The Milligna Show
- Genre: Comedy
- Running time: 30 minutes
- Country of origin: United Kingdom
- Language: English
- Home station: BBC Radio 4
- Starring: Spike Milligan; John Bluthal; Vilma Hollingbery; Ray Ellington; The Alan Clare Quartet
- Created by: Spike Milligan
- Written by: Spike Milligan
- Produced by: John Browell
- Original release: 1972
- No. of series: 1
- No. of episodes: 7

Milligna (or Your Favourite Spike), also known as "The Milligna Show", is a radio comedy sketch show, written by Spike Milligan, performed by John Bluthal, Vilma Hollingbery, and Milligan himself. Musical interludes were provided by Ray Ellington and the Alan Clare Quartet. Alan Clare also took speaking parts.

The show was broadcast on Radio 4 in 1972. Its name was based on Milligan's introduction in The Last Goon Show of All as "Spike Milligna, the well-known typing error".

== Format ==
The show progressed through a loosely linked collection of sketches, one-liners, puns and ethnic jokes. Bluthal provided multiple voices, including impressions of an African chieftain, Alan Whicker, and a Jewish Londoner. Vilma Hollingbery came on when the script required a female voice but otherwise remained in the background. Alan Clare tended to portray stupid teenagers and adults, using a weak Cockney voice which may have been his natural one.

Running ideas provided some continuity. For instance in one edition, Milligan repeatedly announced that he would do an impression of Charles Aznavour singing "Yesterday, When I Was Young", only to be interrupted by Bluthal each time, such as:

Milligan: "Yesterday... when I was young..."
Bluthal: "Stop! Stop! Stop in Israeli!"
Milligan: "Are you Jewish?"
Bluthal: "No, a tree fell on me!"

Milligan tended to repeat his favourite jokes. He would announce "Good evening to you all, except Mrs. Ada Shagnasty of Leeds". In The World of Beachcomber he often used a similar line ending "except Maurice Ponk."

The show included spoof news items including, "Long-missing Van Gogh ear found in a British Rail sandwich".

A longer sketch toward the end of the show might, as in one edition, have Milligan and Bluthal acting as door-to-door salesmen trying to persuade Vilma Hollingbery to upgrade her "dustbin image" by buying the "Midnight Thrill Dustbinette", along with sterilised and perfumed rubbish to put in it. The same edition included Milligan reciting a version of his story "The Singing Foot", originally published in the collection "The Bedside Milligan".

The producer was John Browell who, as tradition then demanded, was subject to a certain amount of abuse. Milligan would read the closing credits, in the voice of a petty official, and pretend to be unable to read Browell's name.
