= The Nasty Affair at the Burami Oasis =

Episode of The Goon Show

"The Nasty Affair at the Burami Oasis" is an episode of The Goon Show, a British radio comedy. It was the first episode of the seventh season and was first broadcast on 4 October 1956.

== Plot ==
The British Garrison at the Burami Oasis is under constant siege from Arab bandits led by the notorious Sheikh Rattelland Roll. A British gunboat under the command of Admiral Ned Seagoon is dispatched to the oasis to restore peace to the area. One problem exists, however: how to get a gunboat into an oasis only ten feet long.

== Buraimi Oasis ==
There really is a Buraimi Oasis, which was the site of a battle between British-led forces and Arab tribesmen in October 1955 known as the Buraimi Dispute, which the episode loosely parodies, with an actual BBC News broadcast clip opening. The real oasis is considerably larger.

== See also ==
- Goon Show episodes and archiving
