= Charlie Chester =

English comedian and radio presenter (1914–1997)

Charlie Chester MBE
- Born: Cecil Victor Manser; 26 April 1914; Eastbourne, Sussex, England
- Died: 26 June 1997 (aged 83); Twickenham, London, England
- Spouses: Dorita Langley (m. 1939; died 1992) Joan Jarvis (m. 1994)
- Children: One

Charlie Chester (26 April 1914 – 26 June 1997) was an English comedian, radio and television presenter and writer, broadcasting almost continuously from the 1940s to the 1990s. His style was similar to that of Max Miller.

== Life and career ==
Chester was born Cecil Victor Manser in Eastbourne, Sussex. His first job after leaving education was as a grocer's errand boy, but he won talent competitions for his musical instrument playing and singing. Working as a travelling salesman for an embroidery company, Chester realised he had the gift of the gab and decided to become a professional comedian.

Known as "Cheerful" Charlie Chester, he was popular with British audiences in the 1940s from his BBC radio show Stand Easy. This show was adapted for television as The Charlie Chester Show in 1949 and became a stand-up and sketch show for the next 11 years. Frequent cast members included Edwina Carroll, Henry Lytton Jr., Eric "Jeeves" Grier, Len Lowe, Deryck Guyler, Len Marten, Arthur Haynes and Frederick Ferrari. A later recurring mini-serial in the show was "Whippit Kwik the Cat Burglar", whose whistled signature tune made Chester a national favourite. Tenor St Clair was replaced by Ferrari, known as "The Voice", and for whom Chester wrote the signature song "When Love Descended like an Angel". That was the only fragment written, until listeners' demands forced him to write a full version so that Ferrari could record it.

Chester's radio shows included A Proper Charlie, That Man Chester, and Pot Luck.

In 1961, Chester starred in a BBC series called Charlie Chester On Laughter Service, a music and comedy show that visited military bases throughout Britain. Most were co-written by Bernard Botting and Charlie Hart. Late in his career, Chester appeared in the Channel 4 television sitcom Never Say Die.

In the 1960s, he began presenting a record show on the BBC Light Programme, later BBC Radio 2. On 5 October 1970 he started his weekday show which from 1 October 1972 became his long-running radio show Sunday Soapbox, which in later years came from the BBC's Birmingham studios (previously from Manchester). He opened the programme each week with the introduction "With a box full of records and a bag full of post, it's radio Soapbox and Charlie your host!" The programme was transmitted on Sunday afternoons until Chester suffered a stroke in November 1995, after which he could not walk or talk. Its opening and signature tune was called "Music To Drive By" by Alan Moorhouse.

== Honours and recognition ==
He was the subject of This Is Your Life in 1961 when he was surprised by Eamonn Andrews at the BBC Television Theatre.

A casino club in Archer Street, Soho, was named "Charlie Chester's" after him.

Chester presented brass band music in the series Listen to the Band and also featured in the BBC Radio 2 show The Gag Cracker's Ball. In his leisure time he enjoyed painting. He was appointed Member of the Order of the British Empire (MBE) in the 1990 Birthday Honours for charitable services.

== Death ==
He suffered a stroke and died in Twickenham on 26 June 1997 aged 83.

== TV credits ==
- The Charlie Chester Show (1949) (performer and writer)
- Christmas Box (1955) (performer)
- Educated Evans (1957) (performer)
- These Are The Shows (1957) (performer)
- The Two Charleys (1959) (performer)
- Charlie Chester On Laughter Service (1961) (performer and writer)
- The Charlie Chester Music Hall (1961) (performer)
- Jokers Wild (1969) (performer)
- Never Say Die (1987) (performer)

== Film credits ==
- Holiday Camp (1947) as himself
- Can I Come Too? (1979) as Mr. Royal

== Bibliography ==
- The World Is Full of Charlies (Autobiography) published NEL (1974)
