= London Entertains =

- Directed by: E. J. Fancey
- Written by: Jimmy Grafton
- Produced by: E. J. Fancey
- Starring: Eamonn Andrews
- Distributed by: Watsofilms
- Release date: 1951
- Running time: 48 minutes
- Country: Great Britain
- Language: English

London Entertains is a 1951 British quasi-documentary film that combines a travelogue around London with film of various variety stars including The Goons and Bobby Breen. The film was conceived by Jimmy Grafton and produced and directed by Edwin John Fancey.

The film uses the pretext of girls returning from a Swiss finishing school and setting up an agency called At Your Service to show tourists to London around the sites of the 1951 Festival of Britain. They are aided by BBC radio presenter Eamonn Andrews who uses his show-business contacts to get the girls in to see variety shows.

Entertainment locations visited include the Windmill Theatre and Grafton's, the public house owned by the film's writer Jimmy Grafton, where The Goon Show (then known as Crazy People) was recorded. The film also includes footage of actress Gloria Swanson touring the construction site of the Royal Festival Hall and the Southbank Centre. The actresses playing the girls were members of the Eastbourne Girls Choir.
