= Christopher Timothy =

Welsh actor and narrator (born 1940)

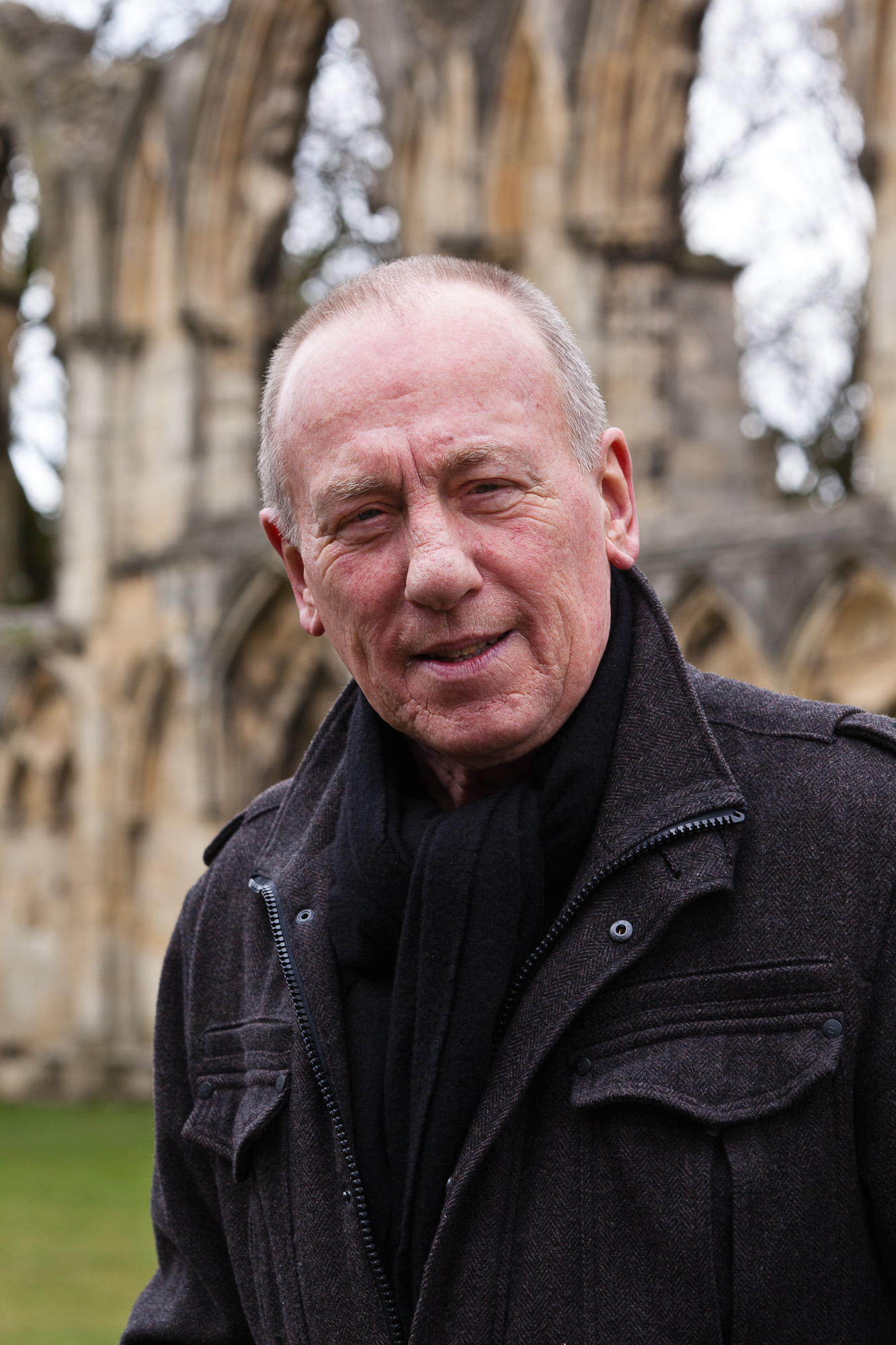
- Timothy in 2012
- Born: 14 October 1940 (age 85); Bala, Gwynedd, Wales
- Education: Royal Central School of Speech and Drama
- Occupations: Actor; narrator
- Years active: 1964–present
- Spouses: Susan Boys (m. 1965, divorced) Annie Swatton (m. 1982)
- Children: 7
- Father: Andrew Timothy

Christopher Timothy (born 14 October 1940) is a British actor and narrator. He is known for his roles as James Herriot in All Creatures Great and Small, Mac McGuire in the BBC One daytime soap opera Doctors and Ted Murray in the BBC One primetime soap opera EastEnders. In 2026 he appeared as Alan, a patient in Casualty.

== Early life ==
Timothy was born in Bala, Wales in 1940. He is the son of Anglican priest and BBC announcer Andrew Timothy and his first wife, Gwladys Marian nee Hailstone.

When aged five Timothy moved with his family to south London, and at thirteen to Shrewsbury, where he attended Kingsland Grange Preparatory School and Priory Grammar School for Boys, and trained at the Central School of Speech and Drama. After leaving school and until his first paid acting engagements he worked in a Shrewsbury hat shop.

== Career ==
Timothy's first professional stage engagement was in the play Chips with Everything in London and New York, in the role of an RAF military policeman for more than six months. In the 1960s, Timothy was part of Laurence Olivier's National Theatre company and appeared in such productions as The Master Builder, Juno and the Paycock and Olivier's Othello. Timothy's television career started with the 1969 series Take Three Girls, and he went on to appear in UFO (1970 episode "The Psychobombs"), Doctor at Large in 1971, Some Mothers Do 'Ave 'Em in 1973 and Murder Most English: A Flaxborough Chronicle in 1977 before winning the role of Herriot.

He played the role of James Herriot in All Creatures Great and Small for the full 90 episodes, from 1978 until 1990. Timothy later recalled meeting the author, Alf Wight, who had "a soft, lilting Scottish accent – though I was told to keep my speech neutral to retain the universality of the part. Which I thought was complete bollocks".

His film career included roles in Here We Go Round the Mulberry Bush (1967), Alfred The Great (1969), The Virgin Soldiers (1969), Spring and Port Wine (1970), The Mind of Mr. Soames (1970), Up the Chastity Belt (1971), and the sex comedy Eskimo Nell (1975).

In 1980, he played Jesus Christ in the York Mystery Plays.

In 2000, he was cast as Mac McGuire in the BBC soap opera Doctors staying in the series for six years, and directing some of the episodes.

In 2004, he made an appearance in Casualty as the murderer of long-standing character Finlay Newton. He also appeared as a special guest on ITV1 drama The Bill, which was aired on New Years Day 2009. More recently he has appeared in Lewis (ITV1) in the episode "Wild Justice", The Grapes of Wrath, All the Fun of the Fair, Haunting Julia and Casualty (2014).

He is the son of BBC announcer Andrew Timothy, and has done regular voice work himself including taking his father's place as the announcer for the Goon Again Show in 2001 marking the 50th anniversary of The Goon Show (Andrew had been the announcer for the show back in the early 1950s). He played the announcer role on The Kinks' 1974 double album, Preservation Act 2.

He was the subject of This Is Your Life in 2000 when he was surprised by Michael Aspel on the set of Doctors at the BBC's Pebble Mill studios in Birmingham.

He voiced and appeared in numerous television commercials for The Sun newspaper in the 1970s when Rupert Murdoch had entered British newspaper publishing; these were extremely unusual commercials for the time in the level of energy and even aggression evident in Timothy's delivery. As the person in these advertisements, he became a character, a role, in the 2017 stage production of Ink, a play about Australian Rupert Murdoch's start on Fleet Street in British newspaper publishing with The Sun. Timothy was played by Jack Holden in the Almeida opening and by Andrew Durand in the Broadway production. The play was directed by Rupert Goold, at the Almeida Theatre, London, and later moved to the West End, and then performed on Broadway.

He appeared in BBC Radio's Just a Minute in 1988 and 1989. He was also used in the marketing material for Dignity plc, primarily for their prepaid funeral plans.

In 2008 Timothy took part in the BBC Wales programme Coming Home about his Welsh family history. In 2011, he played himself in the audio drama We are not the BBC written by Susan Casanove and produced by the Wireless Theatre Company.

He returned to theatre in March 2013 in The Living Room. In 2014 he played Inspector Hubbard in the UK tour of the stage thriller Dial M for Murder.

In April 2017, it was announced that he would be joining the BBC soap opera EastEnders as regular character Ted Murray, in which he made his last appearance on 27 September 2019. Timothy appeared with Peter Davison in two series of Great British Car Journeys for Channel 4 in 2018 and 2019. He also appeared in Midsomer Murder S21E1 "The Point of Balance" as Ned Barnaby. In February 2020 Timothy appeared in Shakespeare & Hathaway: Private Investigators as Major Terence Benedick episode #3.3 "The Sticking Place".

In April 2020 Timothy appeared in ITV Series Kate & Koji (Series 1, episode 5). When Kate's flashy ex-husband Dennis arrives in town with his much younger wife, Kate feigns an attachment to Koji

Timothy had narrated the first nine series of Channel 5's The Yorkshire Vet, which features veterinarians Julian Norton and Peter Wright. He had hoped to do so for the tenth series as well, but was self-isolating owing to the COVID-19 pandemic in April 2020. Peter Davison was asked to take on the role because his home was equipped with a recording studio, allowing him to complete the project in spite of the lockdown. Timothy was gracious in his comments. "I'm so sorry not to be able to do the voiceover for The Yorkshire Vet right now, but I can't tell you all how delighted I am that Peter is taking over. He most definitely would be my first choice while I'm in lockdown!"

Timothy had also narrated the audio books of the James Herriot series.

== Personal life ==
Timothy has been married twice; first to Susan Boys, with whom he had four sons and two daughters. During the 1978–1980 first run of All Creatures Great and Small, he had an affair with his screen wife, Carol Drinkwater. He has been married to Annie Veronica Swatton since 1982, and they have one daughter. He is a supporter of National League football club Hartlepool United. Timothy learned to play violin whilst at school and plays occasionally in a local amateur orchestra although he described his ability as moderate (Right Notes May 1992).

== Filmography ==
=== Film ===
| Year | Title | Role | Notes |
|---|---|---|---|
| 1965 | Othello | Cypriot Officer | |
| 1968 | Here We Go Round the Mulberry Bush | Spike | |
| 1969 | Alfred the Great | Cedric | |
| 1969 | The Virgin Soldiers | Cpl. Brook | |
| 1970 | Spring and Port Wine | Joe | |
| 1970 | The Mind of Mr. Soames | T.V. Camera Operator | |
| 1972 | Up the Chastity Belt | Vendor | |
| 1975 | Eskimo Nell | Harris Tweedle | |
| 2003 | Hamlet | Gravedigger | |

=== Television ===
| Year | Title | Role | Notes |
|---|---|---|---|
| 1967 | Boy Meets Girl | Cowper | Episode: "Long After Summer" |
| 1967 | Theatre 625 | Andreyushkin | Episode: "The Single Passion" |
| 1967 | Much Ado About Nothing | Server | TV film |
| 1968 | Half Hour Story | Cave | Episode: "The Money Spider" |
| 1969 | Thirty-Minute Theatre | Andrea | Episode: "These Men Are Dangerous: Mussolini" |
| 1969 | BBC Play of the Month | Cinna | Episode: "Julius Caesar" |
| 1969 | Galton and Simpson Comedy | Tony | Episode: "Friends in High Places" |
| 1969 | World in Ferment | Various | Episode: #1.6 |
| 1970 | BBC Play of the Month | Fedotik | Episode: "The Three Sisters" |
| 1970 | ITV Sunday Night Theatre | Valentine | Episode: "Twelfth Night" |
| 1970 | Take Three Girls | Henley | Episode: "Gloria for First Offence" |
| 1970 | Hark at Barker | P.C. Billings | Episode: "Rustless on Law" |
| 1970 | ITV Playhouse | Mark | Episode: "A Family and a Fortune" |
| 1970 | Hark at Barker | Barry | Episode: "Rustless on Sport" |
| 1970 | Menace | David | Episode: "The Straight and the Narrow" |
| 1970 | UFO | Skydiver 3 Navigator | Episode: "The Psychobombs" |
| 1971 | Six Dates with Barker | Albert | Episode: "1937: The Removals Person" |
| 1971 | The Liver Birds | Harry | Episode: "Three's a Crowd" |
| 1971 | Z Cars | George Swainson | Episode: "Triangle Squared: Part 1" |
| 1971 | The Two Ronnies | Harry | Episode: #1.7 |
| 1971 | Doctor at Large | Car Salesman | Episode: "A Little Help from My Friends" |
| 1971 | Kate | Bob | 2 episodes |
| 1971 | The Fenn Street Gang | Tony Lawson | Episode: "The Start of Something Big" |
| 1971 | ITV Sunday Night Theatre | Tony Abbott | 3 episodes |
| 1972 | The Pathfinders | Flight Lt. Bill Booth | Episode: "Our Daffodils Are Better Than Your Daffodils" |
| 1973 | The Rivals of Sherlock Holmes | Solicitor | Episode: "The Mysterious Death on the Underground Railway" |
| 1973 | The Moon Shines Bright on Charlie Chaplin | Corporal | TV film |
| 1973 | The Upper Crusts | Parsloe | Episode: "By Endeavour Alone" |
| 1973 | ITV Sunday Night Theatre | Tom Palmer | Episode: "Harlequinade" |
| 1973 | Crown Court | Richard Quennel | 3 episodes |
| 1973 | Van der Valk | Ernest | Episode: "The Rainbow Ends Here" |
| 1973 | 2nd House | L. Cpl. Johnson | Episode: "National Service" |
| 1973 | Some Mothers Do 'Ave 'Em | Roy | Episode: "Frank and Marvin" |
| 1973 | Murder Must Advertise | Mr. Willis | All 4 episodes |
| 1975 | Rooms | Tim | 2 episodes |
| 1975 | Goose with Pepper | Sergeant | TV film |
| 1976 | Killers | Sidney Harry Fox | Episode: "Murder at the Metropole" |
| 1976 | The Dick Emery Show | Various | 2 episodes |
| 1977 | Murder Most English | Det. Sgt. Love | All 7 episodes |
| 1977 | Van der Valk | Policeman | Episode: "The Professor" |
| 1977 | BBC2 Play of the Week | Kevin | Episode: "The Kitchen" |
| 1978–1990 | All Creatures Great and Small | James Herriot | All 90 episodes |
| 1978 | Return of the Saint | The Gent | Episode: "The Poppy Chain" |
| 1982 | Take Three Women | Henley | Episode: "Victoria" |
| 1984 | All the World's a Stage | Various | 2 episodes |
| 1984 | See How They Run | Lt. Cpl. Clive Winton | |
| 1986–1988 | Hot Metal | Voiceover | 5 episodes |
| 1987 | C.A.T.S. Eyes | Voice on Commercial | Episode: "Carrier Pigeon" |
| 1987–1988 | The Kenny Everett Television Show | Various | 2 episodes |
| 1998 | The Bill | D.S. Duffield | Episode: "Big Day" |
| 2000 | Holby City | Chris Collins | Episode: "A Life Worth Saving" |
| 2000–2006, 2024 | Doctors | Mac McGuire | Regular role |
| 2004 | Casualty | Karl Ackerman | 4 episodes |
| 2009 | The Bill | Jeff Phelps | Episode: "The Morning After" |
| 2011 | Lewis | Barry Winter | Episode: "Wild Justice" |
| 2014 | Casualty | Richard Lynd | Episode: "Once in a Lifetime" |
| 2015–2023 | The Yorkshire Vet | Narrator | 148 episodes |
| 2017–2019 | EastEnders | Ted Murray | Regular role |
| 2018-2019 | Vintage Roads | Himself | 2 seasons |
| 2019 | Midsomer Murders | Ned Barnaby | Episode: "The Point of Balance" |
| 2020 | Shakespeare & Hathaway: Private Investigators | Major Terence Benedick | Episode: "The Sticking Place" |
| 2020 | Kate & Koji | Dennis | Episode: #1.5 |
| 2026 | Casualty | Alan Gibson | Episode: "Lethal Legacy" |

== Awards and nominations ==
| Year | Award | Category | Nominated work | Result | Ref. |
|---|---|---|---|---|---|
| 2003 | British Soap Awards | Best Actor | Doctors | Nominated | |
| 2004 | British Soap Awards | Best Actor | Doctors | Nominated | |
| 2005 | British Soap Awards | Best Actor | Doctors | Nominated | |
| 2006 | British Soap Awards | Best Actor | Doctors | Nominated | |
