= A Little Big Business =

British TV comedy series (1963–1965)

- Genre: Sitcom
- Written by: Jack Pulman
- Starring: David Kossoff; Francis Matthews
- Country of origin: United Kingdom
- Original language: English
- No. of series: 2
- No. of episodes: 14 + 1 pilot

Production
- Producer: Peter Eton
- Running time: 30 minutes
- Production company: Granada Television

Original release
- Network: ITV
- Release: 27 February 1964 – 11 March 1965

A Little Big Business is a British comedy television series that originally aired on ITV After a pilot episode in 1963, it was followed by two full series in 1964 and 1965. Several of the leading roles were recast after the pilot. A young man is taught about the furniture business by his father.

Guest stars included Warren Mitchell, Isa Miranda and Donal Donnelly.

== Main cast ==
- David Kossoff as Marcus Lieberman
- Joyce Marlow as Miss Stevens
- Francis Matthews as Simon Lieberman
- David Conville as Basil Crane
- Martin Miller as Lazlo
- Diana Coupland as Naomi Lieberman

== Bibliography ==
- Halliwell, Lesslie. Halliwell's Teleguide. Unknown Publisher, 1979.
- Perry, Christopher . The British Television Pilot Episodes Research Guide 1936-2015. 2015.
