= Private Eye TV =

- Genre: Political satire
- Country of origin: United Kingdom
- Original language: English
- No. of episodes: 1

Original release
- Network: BBC2
- Release: 28 December 1971

Private Eye TV is an unsuccessful attempt to turn the satirical magazine Private Eye into a television programme.

In celebration of the magazine's tenth anniversary, the best of its output was compiled by Barry Took and read out by the magazine's staff and assorted comedy stars (like Private Eye, themselves largely originating from the Satire Boom) such as John Bird, Eleanor Bron, Spike Milligan, William Rushton, John Wells, Christopher Booker, Barry Fantoni, Paul Foot and Richard Ingrams.

It was broadcast only once on BBC2 at 10.30pm on Tuesday 28 December 1971.

Some short extracts were re-shown on BBC2's Comedy Map of Britain documentary broadcast in February 2007.
