= John Snagge =

British newsreader (1904–1996)

John Snagge OBE
- Reading the news c. 1944
- Born: John Derrick Mordaunt Snagge; 8 May 1904; Chelsea, London, England
- Died: 25 March 1996 (aged 91); Wexham, Buckinghamshire, England
- Occupations: Commentator and presenter
- Spouses: Eileen Joscelyne (m. 1936; died 1980) Joan Wilson (m. 1983; died 1992)

Snagge (right) with Frits Thors during a conference in the Netherlands with Radio Oranje in 1946

John Derrick Mordaunt Snagge OBE (8 May 1904 – 25 March 1996) was a British newsreader and commentator on BBC Radio. He began his radio career at Stoke-on-Trent's new relay station 6ST as assistant director and became one of the BBC's primary radio announcers in 1928. Snagge was the voice of the Oxford and Cambridge Boat Race from 1931 to 1980 and was the announcer of important events of the Second World War and major British state occasions.

== Early life and education ==
Born on 8 May 1904 in Chelsea, London, Snagge was the second son of the judge Mourdant Snagge and his wife Gwendaline Rose Emily Colomb. His paternal grandfather was Sir Thomas William Snagge, KCMG (1837–1914). His maternal grandfather was the British naval strategist, Sir John Colomb, KCMG (1838–1909). Snagge had a brother. He was educated at Winchester College and Pembroke College, Oxford, where he obtained a degree in law despite, by his own admission, not excelling academically but was on the rowing team.

== Career ==
Snagge then joined the British Broadcasting Company (BBC) from Oxford in December 1924, taking up the position of assistant director at Stoke-on-Trent's new relay station 6ST, that relayed programmes from London. His first day at the station was 10 December 1924. His job at the station was to read news bulletins, ran a weekly programme using the Staffordshire Potteries and perform duets with the station's producer during the live children's programming strand Children's Hour. He broadcast his first sports commentary (of a Hull City versus Stoke City football match) in January 1927, after the BBC obtained the rights to cover major sporting events.

In 1928, after the company became a chartered corporation, Snagge's voice and aptitude meant he was transferred to Savoy Hill, London by John Reith, the director-general of the BBC, to work as one of the corporation's main announcers alongside Stuart Hibberd, Starting from 1931, he commentated on the annual Oxford and Cambridge Boat Race on radio, developing the intonation "In...out...in...out". Two years later, Snagge was appointed appointed assistant of the corporation's outside broadcast department in 1933. He was Gerald Cock's assistant for the broadcast of the Silver Jubilee of George V in 1935. In 1936, he described the maiden voyage of the RMS Queen Mary ocean liner across the Atlantic and participated in the beginning of the first high-definition television service at Alexandra Palace that November. Snagge provided commentary for the coronation of George VI at a position opposite Buckingham Palace in 1937.

During 1938, he made the first radio and television broadcasts from within a diving suit in London. Snagge also broadcast from a large bucket as he was lowered down an access shaft and into a drainage culvert by a crane at the Derwent Hills, Derby, providing commentary on the Derby Drainage Scheme. He broadcast from a bareback circus and from mid-air while jumping through a window. In July 1939, Snagge was broadcast going down from the top of a water tower and onto a sheet during a firefighting drill at the Lambeth headquarters of the London Fire Brigade. He was promoted to assistant director of the outside broadcast department in 1939. Snagge was a commentator of the Henley Royal Regatta rowing meet.

At the start of the Second World War, Snagge was made the BBC's presentation director responsible for the corporation's announcing staff and delivered important radio announcements as the war unfolded. "Here is the news, and this is John Snagge reading it" became a catchphrase of his when the BBC decided to allow its announcers to publicly identify themselves to distinguish themselves from Nazi German propaganda broadcasts. Patrick Newley of The Stage wrote Snagge made it possible for others such as Alvar Lidell to identify themselves on air. Snagge and his staff were responsible for studio continuity and dealing with wartime attacks. He announced the attack on Pearl Harbour in December 1941 and the Capture of Rome as well as Victory in Europe Day. By the time of the D-Day landings in 1944, he was presenting the magazine programme War Report which featured regular news from the beaches of Normandy. He announced that Allied Armies have started landing "on the northern coast of France" at 9.32 am on 6 June, but without giving the actual location (Normandy). Following the end of the war, Snagge was appointed head of presentation of the BBC Home Service, a role he held until 1957 when he became head of presentation (sound) after earlier rejecting an offer to become the BBC's controller of Northern Ireland. In 1963, he was assigned special duties until 1965.

He introduced the broadcasts of the Royal Family's tour of the Union of South Africa in 1947, and presented a series of four half-hour programmes commemorating the BBC's 25th anniversary that same year. The year later, Snagge provided commentary for the film XIVth Olympiad–The Glory of Sport about the 1948 Summer Olympics in London. During the 1949 University Boat Race Snagge's voice filled with excitement and he reported: "I can't see who's in the lead but it's either Oxford or Cambridge". He also announced on 6 February 1952 at 11:15 the death of George VI, and provided commentary for the coronation of Elizabeth II from the triforium in Westminster Abbey in 1953. As his voice became associated with important announcements, Snagge was asked by the director-general not to produce such broadcasts without his permission in 1954.

In the early 1950s, Snagge played a role in negotiations that led to the radio comedy series The Goon Show being commissioned by the BBC. He was also the subject of many running gags during the show, and provided many self-parodying announcements, usually recorded. He also featured as himself in the episode The Greenslade Story, alongside regular announcer Wallace Greenslade. He was a defender of the show against many efforts to cancel it, even to staking his career on it. Later, in the 1970s, he echoed his wartime role by appearing as the newsreader in the radio version of Dad's Army, setting the scene at the beginning of each episode.

In August 1959, Snagge appeared on Desert Island Discs. His chosen book was The Little World of Don Camillo by Giovannino Guareschi and his luxury item was a painting by Rembrandt. That October, he was allowed by the BBC to appear in the ITV documentary Home Front about the Second World War. He appeared as himself in an episode of the television series Hancock's Half Hour called The East Cheam Centenary in 1960 and also played himself in a 1961 episode of Here's Harry called The Request. Snagge retired from the BBC staff on 7 May 1965, but continued to provide commentaries for the Boat Race as a freelancer until 1980, read The Epilogue on BBC Radio 4 and ran a radio series called John Snagge's London that ran for more than 100 episodes on BBC Radio London from 1974 to 1981. Around this time he also appeared on Noel Edmonds's BBC Radio 1 show on Sunday mornings. Snagge also focused on charity work.

When BBC Radio Stoke-on-Trent (now BBC Radio Stoke) was launched in 1968 Snagge introduced the new station by apologising for the break in transmission that had occurred on 30 October 1928, i.e. the close of 6ST, and that it was "due to circumstances beyond our control. Normal transmission has now been resumed". He voiced the commentary on the Sex Pistols track, Pistols Propaganda, which appeared on the B-side of their single (I'm Not Your) Stepping Stone. Snagge was a three-time chairman of the Lord's Taverners (which he co-founded), its president on two separate occasions and its secretary from 1965 to 1967. In 1972, he and Michael Barsley wrote a book called Those Vintage Years of Radio about the early years of British radio. Snagge was a member of the Leander Rowing Club.

== Personal life ==
He was the guardian of Wally Hope, founder of the Stonehenge Free Festival, until he died in 1975. Snagge was appointed Officer of the Order of the British Empire (OBE) in the 1944 New Year Honours. He was married twice. Snagge's first marriage was at Church of St Giles, Stoke Poges on the afternoon of 19 September 1936 to the school dentist Eileen Mary Joscelyne (the daughter of Harry Percy Joscelyne). She died in 1980. Snagge married, secondly, to former BBC colleague Joan Wilson on 6 January 1983. She predeceased him in 1992. Snagge had no children from both of his marriages. He died from throat cancer at Thames Valley Nutfield Hospital, Wexham, Buckinghamshire on 25 March 1996. A memorial service for Snagge was held at All Souls Church, Langham Place on 15 May 1996.
