= Dennis Main Wilson =

British producer

- Born: Dennis Geoffrey William Wilson; 1 May 1924; Dulwich, London, England
- Died: 20 January 1997 (aged 72); Surrey, England
- Occupations: Radio and television producer

Dennis Geoffrey William Wilson, known as Dennis Main Wilson (1 May 1924 – 20 January 1997) was a British producer of radio and television programmes, mainly for the BBC. Main Wilson has been described by Screenonline as "arguably the most important and influential of all comedy producers/directors in British radio and television".

== Life and career ==
Dennis Geoffrey William Wilson was born at Dulwich, London, the son of mechanical engineer George Arthur Main Wilson and Violet Rose (née Bayley). He was educated at Colfe's School in Lewisham.

After wartime work for the German service of the BBC, he worked in comedy. He was producer of The Goon Show's first two series. Spike Milligan, aware of Main Wilson's predilection for consuming alcohol, affectionately nicknamed him "Dennis Main Drain". Subsequently he produced the first four series of Hancock's Half Hour on radio, before leaving to train in television. Till Death Us Do Part, also for the BBC, is his best remembered television work.

Other shows he produced include Sykes and a... with Eric Sykes and Hattie Jacques, Here's Harry with Harry Worth, It's Marty starring Marty Feldman and The Rag Trade (which he also directed). He had less success with Private Eye TV, an attempt to turn the magazine Private Eye into a television programme.

In 1976, a scene-shifter at the BBC handed him a script he had written. Main Wilson turned it into Citizen Smith. The scene-shifter was John Sullivan, who later wrote Just Good Friends, Dear John and Only Fools and Horses. Main Wilson gave TV breaks to Stephen Fry, Hugh Laurie, Griff Rhys Jones and Emma Thompson.

Main Wilson died of lung cancer at the age of 72.

== Personal life ==
In 1955, Main Wilson married Sylvia Harkin; the couple had a son and a daughter.
