= John Browell =

John Logan Browell (29 June 1917 – 19 May 1997 in Watford, Hertfordshire) was a radio producer who worked primarily in BBC Radio.

Born in Poplar, London, Browell's family soon moved to Leeds, where he went to school and learnt how to play the violin and saxophone. During World War II, he was a radio technician in the Royal Air Force (RAF), mainly stationed in Ceylon (now Sri Lanka). Before the war, he worked for Barclays Bank, but on demob chose a career in entertainment. He joined the BBC in London, becoming a senior sound engineer in light entertainment, and, from 1954, a producer, initially working on music such as Sing Something Simple.

He is best remembered for producing the final two series of The Goon Show (1958–60) and its special edition The Last Goon Show of All (1972). He also produced comedies with Goon Show writer and performer Spike Milligan, including Milligna (or Your Favourite Spike) in 1972. He also worked on long running radio series with, among others, Benny Hill, Frankie Howerd and Beryl Reid.
