= Andrew Timothy =

Priest and radio announcer (1912–1990)

Andrew Timothy (30 November 1912 – 9 December 1990) was an Anglican priest and BBC Radio announcer, who is known for being the original announcer of the comedy series The Goon Show. His son is the actor Christopher Timothy.

== Early life and education ==
Son of Rev. Thomas Evan Timothy, of Llangeitho, rector of Corwen, he was educated at Marlborough College, and followed his father into a church career.

== BBC career ==
Timothy announced for the BBC Home Service from 1947 to 1959, becoming head of presentation in the 1950s and the BBC's Chief Announcer by 1964. He was one of the first BBC television newsreaders (albeit out-of-vision) from July to September 1954.

== The Goon Show ==
Timothy announced the show from its inception in 1951, but left part-way through the fourth series in 1953 "fearing for his sanity" and was replaced by Wallace Greenslade, who remained on the show until it ended in 1960. However, when The Last Goon Show of All was produced in 1972 Greenslade had died, and so Timothy came back to announce the special reunion show. When a remake of The Goon Show (called Goon Again) was made in 2001, it was announced by Timothy's son Christopher.

== Personal life ==
Timothy was married three times; he and his first wife, (Gwladys) Marian (née Hailstone) were divorced by 1946. Their son, actor Christopher Timothy, most notably played the vet James Herriot in the BBC TV series All Creatures Great and Small. His second wife was Florence Watkins. In 1970, Timothy married thirdly Brigid Ruth Patricia, daughter of Brian Dodwell Crichton, MD, of Carrowgarry, Beltra, County Sligo, Ireland; the Crichtons were Irish gentry. Timothy lived at Inglenook, Stonards Brow, Shamley Green, Surrey. Whilst resident at a nursing home, he died in December 1990 at the age of 78.
