= BBC Transcription Services =

The BBC Transcription Services started life in the mid-1930s as the London Transcription Service to license BBC Radio programmes to overseas broadcasters who were authorised to broadcast the programmes for a set period, usually two or three years. The programmes sold to overseas broadcasters in this way covered every part of the BBC's output, including all types of music, drama, religious and children's programmes and comedy. It is now called BBC Radio International.

Whilst the BBC destroyed most broadcast recordings it produced for its various outlets, BBC Transcription Services often retained their copy and many of the surviving radio programmes from the 1940s onwards owe their survival to the fact that Transcription Services issued the material.

The original releases were in the form of 12-inch 78 rpm discs. Each of these discs contained no more than three or four minutes per side and so a radio operator would have needed to cue the start of many discs as the previous one finished for a half hour programme. Consecutive parts of a programme were on different discs to enable the radio operator to cue the start of the next part of the programme from a different disc from the one being played.

By around 1947, the 78 rpm discs were replaced with 16-inch transcription discs running at 33⅓ rpm. These coarse groove discs each contained approximately ten minutes per side, so the requirement to cross fade throughout an episode was still required.

As per Ted Kendall's Technical Notes (included in The Goon Show Compendium box sets), the 16-inch discs were superseded by 10-inch and later 12-inch vinyl LPs from the mid-1950s onward.

These discs were edited to run to standard lengths, and to remove any content deemed too topical or potentially offensive. In the case of The Goon Show, for instance, each episode was cut to approximately 29 minutes and 30 seconds. A later reissue series of Goon Show episodes was cut further to 27 minutes to accommodate commercials.

BBC Transcription Services typically pressed only one hundred copies of each disc with instructions to the overseas radio network to destroy the disc at the end of the licence period.
