= Jimmy Grafton =

Jimmy Grafton

James Douglas Grafton MC (19 May 1916 – 2 June 1986) was a producer, writer and theatrical agent. He served in World War II as an officer in the Bedfordshire and Hertfordshire Regiment and was awarded the Military Cross for his actions during Operation Market Garden.

After the war he worked within his family publican business, taking over as manager at Grafton's pub in London while also acting as a part-time scriptwriter. The pub served as a meeting place for many comedians, including Spike Milligan, Harry Secombe, Peter Sellers and Michael Bentine. Grafton was instrumental in ensuring the quartet were hired by the BBC for their new programme, eventually called The Goon Show. Grafton also acted as a script editor for the first three series of the show. He continued with scriptwriting for other artistes and acted as Harry Secombe's agent for over 25 years.

He died in 1986, at the age of 70.

== Biography ==
Grafton was born on 19 May 1916 in Westminster, London; he had a twin brother, Peter. He was educated at Westminster City School in London and Sutton Valence School in Kent. He was commissioned into the Territorial Army in 1935.

During World War II Grafton transferred as a major to the Bedfordshire and Hertfordshire Regiment. He was awarded a Military Cross for his actions during Operation Market Garden, where he had been involved in hand-to-hand fighting; he also requested an artillery barrage on his own position because it was being overrun by German tanks. While waiting for his demobilisation he started writing sketches for the entertainment of the men in his command.

After his demobilisation in 1946, he returned to London and became publican of Grafton's, a pub which had been in the Grafton family's possession since 1848. In addition to his duties as a publican, Grafton was also a Westminster city councillor and later a scriptwriter for the comedian Derek Roy, for use in the series Variety Bandbox. Roy was also Grafton's second cousin.

One of the patrons of Grafton's was Michael Bentine, an ex-intelligence officer and comedian, who introduced Grafton to Harry Secombe; Grafton recognised Secombe's voice as one of the actors on Variety Bandbox. Secombe and Bentine introduced Grafton to two other comedians shortly thereafter, Peter Sellers and Spike Milligan. When Milligan was looking for a new place to stay, Grafton offered him a room above the pub, and the four comedians used Grafton's as their meeting place. As their act developed towards what was later to become The Goon Show, Grafton would act as advisor to their comedy and careers, earning him the nickname KOGVOS—(Keeper of Goons and Voice of Sanity). (Note: The meaning of the acronym KOGVOS was flexible: it has also been defined as "King of Goons and Voice of Sanity" and "King of the Goons Voices Society".) With the four comics spending time at the pub, and with Grafton scriptwriting for an increasing number of people, the hostelry attracted an increasing number of friends from radio and show business, including Terry-Thomas, Jimmy Edwards, Dick Emery, Tommy Cooper, Kenneth More, Beryl Reid, Clive Dunn, Graham Stark, Tony Hancock and Larry Stephens.

In 1950 Grafton used his connections within the BBC to arrange an audition for the Goons; he also secured the BBC announcer, Andrew Timothy, to act as the programme's link man. Timothy had also been a fellow officer from Grafton's old regiment during the war. The first audition tape was not successful, but a second, recorded in 1951, led to the hiring of the Goons for their first series, Crazy People; Grafton acted as script editor for this series and the following two, which were broadcast under the name The Goon Show.

By this stage Grafton was acting as one of Secombe's two agents, a role he performed for over 25 years, while continuing with his career as a scriptwriter. During his writing career, Grafton wrote more than 500 programmes, including 200 sitcoms. His output included all aspects of broadcast media, with his work on the radio, such as Variety Bandbox, The Goon Show and Billy Cotton Band Show; films that included Down Among the Z Men, A Santa for Christmas and Sunstruck; and television, including The Dickie Henderson Half-Hour, Pepys and a range of programmes with Harry Secombe.

Grafton was married to Dorothy (née Bleackley) and the couple had two children, James and Sally. He died in Chichester, West Sussex, on 2 June 1986, at the age of 70; a memorial service was held at the Military Chapel of the Chelsea Barracks on 22 September that year.

== Selected writing credits ==
- Variety Bandbox (Radio)
- London Entertains (Film 1951)
- The Goon Show (Radio 1951–53)
- Goonreel (TV 1952)
- Down Among the Z Men (Film 1952)
- Billy Cotton Band Show (Radio Eight years between 1956–65)
- A Santa for Christmas (Film 1957)
- New Look (TV 1959)
- The Dickie Henderson Half-Hour (TV 1959–64; 1971)
- Secombe and Friends (TV 1966)
- Mum's Boys (TV 1968)
- Sunstruck (Film 1972)
- The Harry Secombe Show (TV 1972–73)
- Relatively Secombe (TV 1978)
- Secombe With Music (TV 1980–82)
- Pepys (TV 1983)

== Notes and references ==
Notes

== Bibliography ==
- Andrews, Cyrus (1954). Radio and Television Who's Who (Third ed.). London: George Young Publications. OCLC 154148019.
- Carpenter, Humphrey (2004). Spike Milligan. London: Hodder & Stoughton. ISBN 978-0-340-82612-6.
- Farnes, Norma (1997). The Goons: The Story. London: Virgin Books. ISBN 1-85227-679-7.
- Farnes, Norma (2003). Spike: an intimate memoir. London: Fourth Estate. ISBN 978-1-84115-786-3.
- Secombe, Harry (1997a). Arias and Raspberries: An Autobiography. London: Pan Macmillan. ISBN 978-0-330-35463-9.
- Secombe, Harry (1997b). Strawberries and Cheam: An Autobiography. London: Pan Macmillan. ISBN 978-0-330-35462-2.
- Sikov, Ed (2002). Mr Strangelove; A Biography of Peter Sellers. London: Sidgwick & Jackson. ISBN 978-0-283-07297-0.
- Wilmut, Roger; Grafton, Jimmy (1981). The Goon Show Companion: A History and Goonography. London: Robson Books. ISBN 0-903895-64-1.
