= Roger Wilmut =

English writer

- Born: Stratford-upon-Avon, Warwickshire, England
- Occupations: non-fiction author, biographer, historian
- Known for: Tony Hancock biography

Roger Wilmut (born 1942) is a British writer and compiler of books on British comedy. Wilmut attended Warwick School, and began his 'day job' as studio technician for the BBC on leaving school in 1961. Wilmut claims to have drifted into a career as a writer "by accident". Wilmut's books include The Goon Show Companion, Tony Hancock: Artiste, From Fringe to Flying Circus (a history of Oxbridge comedy in the 1960s and 1970s) and Didn't You Kill My Mother-in-law (a history of the 1980s alternative comedy movement in the UK).

== Early life ==
Wilmut was born in Stratford-upon-Avon, Warwickshire in 1942. His parents moved there when they were married in 1940 and his father, who had been teaching in Caterham, Surrey, got a post at King Edward VI School in Stratford. Wilmut's mother was a keen theatregoer, and as a result he saw many of the Shakespeare productions at the Royal Shakespeare Theatre from the late 1950s to about the early 1970s. Wilmut attended Warwick School, and began his 'day job' as studio technician for the BBC on leaving school in 1961.

== Career ==
Wilmut's enthusiasm for the Goons led to the first of his books. In 1974, with the help of friends Tim Smith and Peter Copeland, he revised a list of the series' episodes supplied by the BBC, and his own earlier research, into a "much more complete typewritten list". He then sent it to Robson Books, who showed an interest. While writing the accompanying text he was "approached by the late Jimmy Grafton, who had been involved with the Goons in their early days, and had helped to get the show on the air. He suggested combining his memoirs with my book, and this is what happened, with the book being published in 1976 under the title The Goon Show Companion."

Wilmut was then signed by the agent Roger Hancock, who then commissioned him to "write a similar book about Tony Hancock", his elder brother. The result was 1978's Tony Hancock – 'Artiste', the book for which he conducted his first interviews. Whilst considering a book on Monty Python's Flying Circus, Roger Hancock suggested that he cover "the entire generation of comedy which arose from Oxford and Cambridge Universities after 1961". The result was From Fringe to Flying Circus. It was not until 1985 that Wilmut's next book appeared, a history of theatrical variety, titled Kindly Leave The Stage. Over seventy people were interviewed for the project, with Wilmut remarking he thought he "ought to do the interviews as soon as possible in view of the age of the people involved." In 1989 he produced Didn't You Kill My Mother-in-Law?, a history of British alternative comedy. The book was originally the idea of Peter Rosengard, a life insurance salesman who had helped start this comedy movement by opening The Comedy Store in London in 1979. Like Jimmy Grafton with The Goon Show Companion, the book was part memoir (this time Rosengard's), and part history of the subject by Wilmut.

Other books by Wilmut are The Illustrated Hancock, and his compiling and editing of No More Curried Eggs For Me and Son of Curried Eggs (both anthologies of scripts for the likes of Yes Minister, The Goon Show and Rutland Weekend Television). He has also text edited the scripts for The Complete Beyond The Fringe and the Monty Python's Flying Circus complete script collection Just The Words (both volumes 1 and 2). He says of his time writing comedy books, "it was, on the whole, fun to do and well worth doing – particularly when you consider that all I was trying to do in the first place was type out a list of just one radio show." The Guardian had From Fringe to Flying Circus and Didn't You Kill My Mother-In-Law in its "top 10 books about comedians".

Wilmut is nowadays a collector of gramophone records and runs a YouTube channel of old records and archive material.
