= Wallace Greenslade =

BBC radio announcer and newsreader (1912–1961)

Wallace Greenslade

Wallace Frederick Powers Greenslade (1 July 1912 – 21 April 1961), also known as Bill Greenslade, was a BBC radio announcer and newsreader. He is best remembered for being the announcer—and frequently the straight man—for the BBC radio comedy series The Goon Show for eight series from 1953 until the end of the show's run in 1960.

== Life ==
Greenslade was born in Formby, Lancashire (now part of Merseyside). During the Second World War, he served for two and a half years as a lieutenant commander in the Royal Naval Reserve. He also worked as a purser with P&O.

In 1945 Greenslade joined the BBC, where he began in the European Service, as presentation assistant and newsreader. In 1949 he was appointed a Home Service announcer before becoming a newsreader in both radio and television from November 1955. In addition to The Goon Show, he was announcer for The Great Gilhooly, Star Show and Variety Playhouse. He appeared as a castaway on the BBC Radio programme Desert Island Discs on 12 December 1952. He was one of the original team of BBC Television newsreaders appearing from July 1954 to May 1957. His well-known trademark was always taking off his glasses at the end of each bulletin. In May and June 1960 he presented the Today programme for two months before his death.

Physically a large rotund man, "the massive Greenslade" a colleague once called him, he died suddenly at his home at Weybridge, Surrey, in April 1961, aged 48 from a heart attack. Following a funeral service at St Mary's Oatlands, near Weybridge, he was buried at Brooklands Lane Cemetery, Weybridge. At the subsequent memorial service, his BBC colleague John Snagge gave an address. Greenslade left a wife, Carol.

== Legacy ==
A radio play, Ying Tong – A Walk with the Goons, was broadcast on BBC Radio 4 on 4 April 2007, referencing Greenslade, who was also the subject of an episode of The Goon Show, "The Greenslade Story", broadcast in December 1955.
