= Ray Ellington =

English musician and bandleader (1916–1985)

- Ray Ellington

Background information
- Born: Harry Pitts Brown; 17 March 1916; Kennington, London, England
- Origin: England
- Died: 27 February 1985 (aged 68) England
- Genres: Jazz, blues
- Occupations: Musician, bandleader
- Instrument: Drums

Henry Pitts Brown (born Harry Pitts Brown; 17 March 1916 – 27 February 1985), better known by his stage name Ray Ellington, was an English jazz musician and bandleader. He is best known for his appearances on The Goon Show from 1951 to 1960. The Ray Ellington Quartet had a regular musical segment on the show, and Ellington also had a small speaking role in many episodes, often as a parodic African, Native American or Arab chieftain (but also often, with no attempt to change his normal accent, in counter-intuitive roles such as a female secretary or a Scotsman).

== Early life ==
Ellington was born Henry Pitts Brown, at 155 Kennington Road, Kennington, London, England, the youngest of four children. His father was Harry Pitts Brown (c.1877–1920), an African American music-hall comedian and entertainer, his mother was Eva Stenkell Rosenthal (b. c.1879), a Russian Jew. His father died when Brown was four years old. Ellington was raised as an Orthodox Jew and attended the South London Jewish School (1924–30), before entering show business at the age of twelve, when he appeared in an acting role on the London stage.

== Life and career ==
Ellington's first break came in 1937 when he joined Harry Roy and His Orchestra as the band's drummer, replacing Joe Daniels. His vocal talents were put to good use too, from the time of his first session when he recorded "Swing for Sale". Ellington was called up in May 1940 when he joined the Royal Air Force (RAF) as a physical training instructor where he served throughout the war. He played in service bands including RAF Blue Eagles (1945).

After demobilisation, Ellington resumed his career, fronting his own group, playing at The Bag O'Nails club. Early in 1947, he rejoined the Harry Roy band for a few months. The Ray Ellington Quartet was formed in the same year.

Ellington specialised in jazz but experimented with many other genres and his musical style was heavily influenced by the comedic jump blues of Louis Jordan. Ellington's band was one of the first in the UK to feature the stripped-back guitar/bass/drums/piano format that became the basis of rock and roll, as well as being one of the first groups in Britain to prominently feature the electric guitar. They were also reputedly the first jazz band in the UK to use an amplified guitar, which was produced and introduced by their guitar player, Lauderic Caton. The other members of Ellington's quartet were Dick Katz (piano) and Coleridge Goode (bass). When guitarist Caton moved on he was succeeded in turn by Laurie Deniz, Australian Don Fraser and Judd Proctor, who was a member of the quartet for six years from July 1955.

Ellington appeared in the short film The Super Secret Service (1953).

Early in The Goon Show's run, there were many jokes linking Ellington to the African nation of Ghana, thus leading Ellington to say that he came from Ghana. Ellington's recording of "The Madison" reached No. 36 in the UK Singles Chart in November 1962.

Between 1956 and 1962, he was married to Anita West, who was to become the second female presenter of Blue Peter when she replaced Leila Williams in May 1962. However, West left the programme after four months, citing her upcoming divorce with Ellington as the reason. They had had two young children (Lance and Nina) when the marriage ended in divorce. Ray's son Lance Ellington is a singer who has recorded several jazz-orientated albums, and is one of the backing singers in the BBC show Strictly Come Dancing. Lance Ellington also appeared in tributes to Peter Sellers, in the film The Life and Death of Peter Sellers, where he played his father, and took his father's part in the Goon Show "50th Anniversary Cardboard Replica" first broadcast on 12 April 2001, the day after Harry Secombe died.

Ray Ellington died of cancer on 27 February 1985.
