= Six Charlies in Search of an Author =

Episode of The Goon Show

"Six Charlies in Search of An Author" is an episode of the British radio comedy, The Goon Show. It was first broadcast on 26 December 1956.

The title is a parody of the play Six Characters in Search of an Author, by Luigi Pirandello. While the plot revolves around the common scenario of Neddie Seagoon being blackmailed by Hercules Grytpype-Thynne and Count Jim Moriarty, its development appears to blur the lines between the writer and the characters. The characters refer to places and times as chapters or pages, the author appears in the story and the characters themselves can edit the plot.

== Plot ==
Ostensibly the plot is that of a book being written by Adolphus "Jim" Spriggs. Grytpype-Thynne blackmails Neddie with a 'compromising set of X-ray photographs'. Neddie decides to pawn himself at Henry Crun's pawnshop to pay for the photograph; however, he cannot leave the pawnshop safe until redeemed.

Neddie uses the ten pounds to redeem himself, but then has nothing to pay off his blackmailers. He discovers that Major Bloodnok has the photographs in a safe. Bloodnok does not have the combination. At this point, the characters begin to alter the book with a typewriter, and everything they write comes true. Neddie forces Bloodnok to work by describing him working. Bloodnok retaliates by doing the same. Bluebottle is written in by the author to help them. He has some "silent explosive".

Neddie and Bloodnok are surprised at gunpoint by Moriarty and Grytpype-Thynne, who had played a recording of an explosion "written in without the author's knowledge". Neddie disarms Moriarty by writing in an empty gun, but Grytpype-Thynne writes in an escape down the Amazon with the photographs. Jim Spriggs, the author, appears and demands that they stop interfering with his book. Bloodnok sends him away by writing "...the author turned and left the room!"

Bluebottle, playing with the typewriter, imagines an attack by "Black Claw and his Chinese pirates", ruining their pursuit of the villains. Reaching the banks of the river, they encounter Henry Crun, who tells them "Someone gave Min a typewriter and here I am!" Appealing to the author, they get a happy ending written for them as Neddie marries his fiancée Gladys Minkwater, but Bluebottle writes that Gladys deserts Neddie for him.

== Unscripted moments ==
When Neddie encounters Grytpype-Thynne for the first time, he asks the "bone specialist", "What do you want?"

Grytpype-Thynne : "Bones."
Neddie : [gulps] "I haven't got any bones."
Grytpype-Thynne : "Nonsense, nonsense, you’d fall down without them. You’d fall down without them."
Neddie : "You'd fall down without them!"
Grytpype-Thynne : "You'd fall down without them!"
Sellers (giggling) : "Take your choice!" (both giggle)

== Musical interludes ==
- Max Geldray : "When the Red, Red Robin Comes Bob-bob-bobbin' Along"
- Ray Ellington : "From the Bottom of My Heart"
