= The Histories of Pliny the Elder =

The Histories of Pliny the Elder is a parody of the occupation of Britain by the Romans, from series seven of the 1950s BBC radio comedy, The Goon Show, first broadcast on 28 March 1957.

== Plot ==
In the year X-L-1-1-1 B.C., Julius Caesar (sounding a lot like Hercules Grytpype-Thynne) lands on the British shore and is greeted by Ecclus. Caesar asks his second-in-command, Brutus Moriartus, to seize Ecclus and prepare him for a life of slavery. The next "Charlie Britannicus" to come along is Neddie Seagoon. Caesar remarks "Gad, he's up early. He must be one of the Early Britons." Moriartus finally has to explain that they're here to conquer Britain, and the natives must prepare themselves for "combattus", but they think he means a soccer game and arrive attired in blue jerseys and a football.

For ten years Caesar rules with an iron hand—then with a wooden foot, and finally with a piece of string. He claims he's still an imperial Roman, but then asks for a "half of mild and a packet of crisps." Bloodnokus is brought in, accused of leading a rebellion, and is told he must deliver four of his compatriots for the Coliseum games in Rome. They're put to rowing in the galleys, where Ecclus tells Bluebottlus he's never done this before. The hortator cries out "Faster, you dogs!" and Bluebottlus explains "He wants our dogs to go faster."

Seagoon reappears, now in his true guise as "the Welsh chief Caractacus Seagoon". With Bluebottlus and Ecclus, he is bought by a promoter for the Games. When he learns he is not scheduled to sing, but to be strangled by a gorilla, Seagoon conspires with his fellow prisoners to escape. They are met by Willium Hannibal and Little Jim, who lead them to the hideout of Sprartacus from Prortigal. Sprartacus turns out to be Bloodnok. He tells them they're perfectly safe because the hideout is inside the extinct volcano, Vesumruverus. The volcano promptly explodes, leaving Greenslade reminding listeners to tune in next week.
