= The Goon Show running jokes =

Repeated references in British radio programme

This is a list of running jokes and catchphrases in the 1950s British radio programme The Goon Show.

== Catchphrases ==
Bluebottle's catchphrases

- Bluebottle reads his own stage directions out loud (though he might argue that they would otherwise be lost in a radio programme format). ("Enter Bluebottle wearing doublet made out of mum's old drawers"; "Enter Bluebottle, waits for audience applause... not a sausage"; or "Strikes heroic pose, but trousers fall down and ruin effect"). He also says his inner thoughts out loud, preceded by the stage-direction "Thinks...".
- Bluebottle would say, "I don't like this game!", especially when he was about to be, or had just been "deaded".
- Bluebottle says "You rotten swine, you!" when something bad happens to him like being "deaded". At one point in the episode "The Sinking of Westminster Pier", he complained that he was always being "deaded", and that Eccles never was. This was followed by an explosion and a call of "You rotten swine, Bluebottle!" from Eccles.
- Other Bluebottle catchphrases include: "I heard you call me, My Capitaine!", which was usually addressed to Seagoon.
- Variations of "Ooh! Liquorice! I must be careful of how many of them I eat!"
- Often in reference to one of the many dangers facing him in Goon Show episodes: "Harm can come to a young lad like that!". This latter quote can also be found in two of the many Songs released by the Goons, the "Bluebottle Blues", and the Goons' own recording of "Unchained Melody".
- The intention to use sweets to win the favours of girls: "with these two ounces of jelly babies I will be able to influence Mavis Pringe".

Eccles' catchphrases

- Introducing himself "I'm the famous Eccles".
- The phrase "fine, fine, fine", often said when confused, or at seemingly incongruous moments.
- When someone orders Eccles to "shut up", Eccles himself starts shouting "Shut up" or "Shut up, Eccles", usually being the last to finish.

Grytpype-Thynne's catchphrases

- Hercules Grytpype-Thynne, instead of offering cigarettes to smoke, gave strange items such as gorillas, brass instruments, and pictures of Queen Victoria. Neddie Seagoon would often decline: "Have a Gorilla?" "No thanks, I'm trying to give them up." Later in the show this might be followed with "Have a Gorilla?" "No thanks, I've just put one out."
- "You silly twisted boy, you!" In the fifth series, Grytpype-Thynne says this to Neddie Seagoon on a regular basis in regard to his silly behaviour. In "The White Box of Great Bardfield", a running gag during the show is Seagoon's attempts to win a reward of ten shillings after being chained up by Ray Ellington in the first scene; he has complete confidence in his ability to escape: after all, he is the son of Houdini!! Grytpype-Thynne says the phrase after witnessing Neddie's long and agonising contortions. Ellington himself gets to say this quote in "The End (Confessions of a Secret Senna-Pod Drinker)", and Grytpype also lets Greenslade say it (with permission) in "The Six Ingots of Leadenhall Street". It is also heard in "China Story", following Ned Seagoon's admission that he is the British ambassador, and in "The Whistling Spy Enigma", after Neddie arrives at MI5, giving a long list of patriotic and foolhardy deeds he is willing to do for his country.

Other catchphrases

- The episodes are announced as "the highly-esteemed" or sometimes "the wireless, all-leather" Goon Show.
- Regularly one-liners are responded to with the music hall catchphrase: "I don't wish to know that!"
- Moriarty (but sometimes other characters) exclaims "Sapristi" followed by a second word. This varied, including "nobolas", "needle nardle noo", "nyuckobakakas", "Fred", "pompet", or something to do with that week's plotline.
- Moriarty used the catchphrase "and there's more where that came from". The line was also occasionally used by Bloodnok, at least once by Minnie ("The Scarlet Capsule"), and at least once by Grytpype-Thynne.
- In later episodes, Moriarty, who was played far more deranged, often used a moaned "(Ya gotta go) Owwww" randomly, resulting in Grytpype-Thynne warning him that he'd get in trouble for saying it for various random reasons.
- Bloodnok was usually introduced by his theme music, followed by explosions or gurgling liquid noises. These are used to reference Bloodnok's uncontrollable flatulence, and are usually accompanied by Bloodnok yelling in pain, followed by some explanation of the noise, such as "Curse this Spanish food," or "No more curried eggs for me." Sometimes the music failed to cue the noises, whereupon Bloodnok usually covered up by saying "I'm cured!"
- Other Bloodnok catchphrases include "you filthy swine" and variations on "that's done me a power of good", "quick, get behind the screen, Gladys", "we're just good friends, I tell you" and "it was hell in there" as well as shouting his innocence concerning criminal events in such a way as to make it clear he was involved.
- When introduced in episodes he is often found in the company of other men's wives or sending letters for dirty pictures.
- Little Jim's only line in most episodes is simply to say "He's fallen in the wah-taa!", in a childish voice. It is often commented by the characters, usually Grytpype-Thynne, that they do not know what they would do without him, once even extending to Bloodnok actually attempting to do the catchphrase for him when Jim himself had been thrown into the water. On the BBC Radio show Dad Made Me Laugh Peter Sellers' son Michael revealed he was the source of the phrase, when as a small child he used it to talk about people jumping into their swimming pool.
- Miss Minnie Bannister used many opportunities to say "We'll all be murdered in our beds!" or something along similar lines; after being swallowed by a tiger: "We'll all be murdered in our tigers!", or in "Shangri-La Again": "We'll all be murdered in our monasteries!"
  - In "The End (Confessions Of A Secret Sennapod Drinker)", Minnie gives a legitimate reason for her catchphrase - as Jack the Ripper was never caught, she believes he's waiting until the outcry about his murders have died down..."And then we'll all be murdered in our beds!"
- In the fifth series, Eccles would often state, "It's good to be alive!" at the most inopportune moments. In "1985" (a parody of the George Orwell novel Nineteen Eighty-Four), Eccles modified this catchphrase as "It's good to be alive...in 1985!"
- Henry Crun would often start mumbling "you can't get the wood, you know" when asked to do any sort of job, even though the job (such as the building of a "waterproof gas stove" in The Siege of Fort Night) would never require any wood. Sometimes he would also complain about "a shortage of shortages".
- Announcer Wallace Greenslade would often end episodes with the line, "It's all in the mind, you know". This catchphrase would later be taken up by The Beatles in their 1968 movie, Yellow Submarine.
- Scenes set in the House of Commons often featured someone asking, "who is responsible for the drains in Hackney?"
- Seagoon is often heard making a blatant word-twisting joke to a fellow character or the audience to which both he and the audience will start to laugh. When the audience dies out, Seagoon is often left laughing hysterically. He then notices his mistake in laughing at his own joke, stops and pretends to be clearing his throat.
- Neddie's stock catchphrase was the phrase "Needle-nardle-noo!" which he would use as an exclamation and to punctuate his lines. He would also occasionally utter the phrase "isotopes peru" as a general nonsense phrase e.g.; "I didn't study Astro Navigation in the isotopes peru for nothing, you know!" ("taken from "The Treasure in the Lake") Seagoon would also use the nonsense phrase, "Ying tong iddle-i po", usually followed by some member of the cast yelling "GOOD".
- When asked a question by Grytpype-Thynne, he sometimes replied with "Yes?" repeated with growing rapidity and often ending in a series of chicken-like clucks, followed by Grytpype-Thynne replying "Please... don't do that."
- In the same seasons, whenever the orchestra would strike up a dance number, the following dialogue would take place between Grytpype-Thynne and Neddie, as they were dancing: Q: "Do you come here often?" A: "Only in the mating season!". Later, in "The Choking Horror", Moriarty and Grytpype dance together upon learning that they are to be bombed, and the second sentence is modified to "Only during an Air Raid..."
- Moriarty would be regularly introduced by Grytpype-Thynne with a different nickname and accompanying sound effect. A key example of this is Count Jim "Drop 'Em" Moriarty followed by the sound of a slide-whistle to give the impression of trousers falling down. More than once he was introduced as "Count Jim 'Thighs' Moriarty", and Spike, as Moriarty, gave a knowing "Ooohh!". In another episode he was introduced as "the champion barbed-wire hurdler of France - until his tragic accident".
- In "Shangri-La Again", the issue of catchphrases was addressed directly; Greenslade wearily exclaimed to the audience, "Ying-Tong-Iddle-I-Po. Needle-Nardle-Noo. Spling-Splang-Splong. All's Well That Ends Well, and this is Wallace Greenslade, lover of good English, wishing he were dead!." The immediate response was the sound of a gun being fired, with Peter Sellers joyously exclaiming "Wish granted!"
- Occasionally during an episode, a voice can be heard declaring "I don't like it at all, Pat", an example of which can be found in the opening of "The White Neddie Trade", and possibly a mock complaint to the shows producer, Pat Dixon. The phrase is sometimes altered to "I don't like it Jim".

== Regular plot devices ==
- Bluebottle would often be killed, or "deaded", during the course of an episode. He would often comment on his demise, usually with his catchphrase, "You dirty rotten swines, you! You have deaded me." – or variations on same. Bluebottle, if he survived to the end of the episode, would sometimes note his escape.
- Bluebottle often proclaimed he was brave and manly, yet when called upon to do something of that kind, would often refuse. However, he would soon change his mind when offered a paltry reward, such as in "The Hastings Flyer – Robbed". Seagoon: "Come, come, little two-stone Hercules – now, tell me if you saw two men and you can have this quarter of dolly mixtures." Bluebottle: "Cor, dolly mixture – thinks – with these-type sweets I could influence certain girls at playtime – that Brenda Pugh might be another Rita Hayworth."
- In the 1954–55 season, the show would often start: "The highly esteemed Goon Show presents the BBC!" Occasionally, this would be rephrased as: "The highly steamed Goon Show presents the BBC!"
- Eccles and/or Bluebottle were usually employed in some capacity at which they are completely useless.
- People would travel very long distances in very short spaces of time with a great "whooshing" sound.
- Neddie Seagoon is often referred to as very fat and very short – in "The Greenslade Story", after Neddie exclaims to John Snagge, "Not so fast, Mr John Boat Race Snagge!", Snagge dryly remarks "That voice came out of a little ball of fat that sprang from behind a piano stool"; similarly, in "The Mummified Priest", Bloodnok recognises Seagoon for his ability to walk underneath a piano stool. In "Wings Over Dagenham", Grytpype refers to Neddie as "Little square pudding", and in "World War I", Mr Lalkaka, playing the part of a tailor, has been given Neddie's vital statistics, so that he (Lalkaka) can make Neddie's demob suit. He is at a loss to work out how a person with these measurements can live. Then Neddie enters, and Lalkaka cries: "It's true!"
- Neddie would either be very rich and important (such as the Prime Minister) with Grytpype-Thynne and Moriarty trying to swindle him, or he would be very poor and become their patsy in an implausible money making scheme.
- Wallace Greenslade, the announcer, was portrayed as an idol and heartthrob with his own fan-club, "The Greensladers". At one point he addresses them with the message "I should like to thank the fifty thousand members of the Wallace Greenslade Society, who clubbed together to send me last year's birthday honours. How nice to have such nice, sweet friends." Grytpype immediately stage-whispers "He's a bit of a crawler, Moriarty!"
- Greenslade often refers to the Radio Times magazine, frequently praising it for its low price and interesting content, for example in "The Yehti". In "The Sinking of Westminster Pier", he repeatedly announces that the Goons are performing "The Six Ingots of Leadenhall Street", as stated in that week's Radio Times, insisting that "the Radio Times never lies!" The show had been changed at short notice, and was indeed billed as "The Six Ingots of Leadenhall Street" in the Radio Times.
- The fact that Ray Ellington was black was commonly joked about. Most of these "politically incorrect" statements and jokes were later edited out, and were consequently lost. However, the above episodes are broadcast on Goon Show Radio, and (with the exception of "The Affair Of The Lone Banana"), contain the supposed cuts outlined below.
  - When Neddie Seagoon narrates in "Under Two Floorboards", "At the mention of the police, we all turned white", Ellington, playing his mother Lady Seagoon, interjects, "Get me a mirror!" Later in the episode, when reuniting with brother Eccles and Lady Seagoon in the African desert, Neddie questions the wisdom of her ladyship having made the journey, declaring, "This is a white man's grave!" Lady Seagoon responds, "What's the matter with you? Colour blind?"
  - In "The Childe Harolde Rewarde", Neddie is looking for a blacksmith to help him withdraw the sword from the stone. He meets Ellington and asks, "Are you a blacksmith?" Ellington replies, "My name's Smith, and you've got eyes!"
  - In "Ye Bandit of Sherwood Forest", Bluebottle tells him "If I had my arms free, I'd black your eyes." Ellington parries by asking, "What's the matter, son? Are you colour blind?"
  - In "The Greatest Mountain In The World", Eccles picks up a stick of dynamite, thinking it to be a cigar, and it explodes in his face. Henry Crun comes along, mistakes Eccles for Ellington, and when Eccles corrects him, Henry says, "Oh yes – yours rubs off, doesn't it?" Similarly, Bluebottle says "Don't touch me, Ellington – you will rub off on me!"
  - In "the Jet-Propelled Guided NAAFI", Ellington holds the post of Black Rod within Parliament.
  - In "The Flea", Ellington plays the role of a sergeant in a Scottish regiment (a not-too-subtle reference to the Black Watch), reporting to Major Bloodnok in a distinctly non-Scottish voice; Seagoon asks incredulously, "How did he get into a Scottish Regiment?", to which Bloodnok replies: "He lied about his age".
  - In "The Affair of the Lone Banana", Bloodnok remarks that all of his regiment have "turned yellow"; upon Ellington's demand that he speak for himself, Bloodnok apologises profusely, "I'm sorry Ellington, I know you Irish are very brave!"
  - In "Ill Met By Goonlight", Seagoon is told (by Grytpype) he will be sent ashore with three men with blackened faces, whereupon Seagoon says he's only been given enough blacking for two. The response comes back: "One of the men is Ray Ellington! Any Questions?" Ellington promptly replies, "It's not fair – just 'cos I've got a sunlamp!"
- A recurring rambling conversation between two South Asian Indians (Mr Banerjee and Mr Lalkaka), about nothing in particular and with Indian accents and syntax.
- OBEs were often joked about as though they were very easy to obtain (and perhaps even undesirable).
  - In "The Jet-Propelled Guided NAAFI", Seagoon is the Prime Minister, and as a stimulant has to swallow an OBE daily, applied by his butler Grytpype-Thynne ("friend and confidante, and author of Ten Years As A Russian Spy at No. 10). Grytpype also tells Moriarty in the same episode that he will get "A Russian OBE for that!" .
  - In "The Dreaded Batter Pudding-Hurler (of Bexhill-on-Sea)", Seagoon congratulates Henry Crun for striking down Minnie Bannister. When he admits he didn't do it, Seagoon thunders, "Coward! Hand back your OBE!"
  - In "World War I", Willum is found in a labour exchange, and says to the manager, played by Secombe, "You gotta be careful, there's a lot of work about, mate. Only two more days and I celebrate me fifty years without work." Secombe replies "Fifty years unemployed? Good heavens! Fill in this form for your OBE."
  - In "Queen Anne's Rain", Secombe, on being asked what he would do with an OBE, replies that he would sing it, and does so to the tune of "Shenandoah". Greenslade responds by singing "Oh OBE, the pipes, the pipes are frozen" to the tune of the "Londonderry Air".

== Very long jokes ==
A number of episodes seem to contain jokes which take a minute or more to get to the punchline, often involving repetition, either due to the need to use up time, or more likely, for comic effect. Some examples are below:

- In "The Great Tuscan Salami Scandal", Henry claims to have an idea, forgets it, remembers it, tells Minnie, forgets it again, is told by Minnie and then declares, "What a good idea". Minnie then goes on to ask what was a good idea. This part of the scene goes on for 4 minutes.
- In "The Affair of the Lone Banana", before sending Neddie to South America, Henry Crun spends two minutes apparently taking down Neddie's details, asking him to spell everything, usually more than once, and even falling asleep before finally saying, "It's no good, I'll have to get a pencil and some paper and write all this down."
- In "The Whistling Spy Enigma", Grytpype and Neddie sit down to think of a solution to Neddie's inability to whistle. Greenslade then explains that while they are thinking, the well-known tenor, Webster Smogpule, will fill in time. The tenor then introduces his number, signals for music, waits for three bars, begins to sing "I shine..." only to be interrupted by Grytpype's "I've got it, Seagoon, I've got it!". Smogpule tries again later in the show, only to be shot down in the middle of the second line.
- In "The Mummified Priest", Crun makes a rather lame joke, and bursts into hysterical laughter with Eccles, only for them both to begin 'ha' -ing to a tune, singing 'Ah ha ha ha ha ha ho,' etc. Greenslade then appears: "Listeners will note the cunning way in which the Goons fill in time on their programme!"
- In "China Story", Neddie is instructed by Grytpype to go to the Tea House of the August Goon, knock 6000 times and ask for Ah Pong. He does so to actual gradually sped-up sound-effects. Then, when Milligan, as Throat, answers the door, Neddie asks: "Teahouse of the August Goon?", Throat replies "No!" and slams the door. "Curse!" cries Seagoon, "it's next door! It's always next door in China!" More time elapses as Neddie knocks 6000 times on the correct door. When the door is opened, this time Milligan, in a mock Chinese accent, says "Someblody knock??" Neddie, exhausted, gasps, "Tea House of August Goon?" When Milligan confirms this, Seagoon says, "Are you Ah Pong?" Milligan says, "Yes, we are ah pong (we are open) till 11 o'clock."
- In "The White Neddie Trade", Henry and Minnie tell each other they must not waste any time, and then break into a spontaneous song about not wasting time. Milligan ends the song by saying (almost off-microphone), "We filled out the time like the producer asked!"
- In "The Junk Affair", Bloodnok telephones a warehouse he owns to see if it is on the phone. When the phone in the warehouse rings, he asks Seagoon to answer it, and then asks to speak to the owner. Seagoon replies that the owner is outside, and goes to get Bloodnok. Bloodnok asks Seagoon to hold the phone outside while he goes in to answer the other one. When Bloodnok answers the phone inside the warehouse, Seagoon calls him to speak on the one outside, and Bloodnok asks him to hold the phone inside. Bloodnok, once more outside, again asks to speak to the owner. This routine is repeated several times, from the third time onwards as a gradually speeded-up recording.
- In the episode "The Man Who Tried to Destroy London's Monuments" there is a long scene when Neddie Seagoon goes to Minnie Bannister and Henry Crun's house and knocks on the door. Inside the house Minnie keeps calling Crun's name over and over again to get him to answer the door. Crun however cannot hear her over the knocking on the door and after a long drawn out two minutes he goes down to get Neddie to stop knocking, after which he can finally hear her. After this he then goes to the door and says "You can start knocking again now" before going back inside. The knocking starts again and Min starts calling his name again to get him to answer the door and he still can't hear her. After about five minutes of this they let Neddie inside.
- In "The Giant Bombardon", Captain Ned Seagoon gives a report to parliament on the Russian fortifications at Sebastopol, claiming the walls are twenty feet thick. A nasal-toned MP (voiced by Sellers) immediately asks for clarification – "You say the walls are twenty feet thick? Why do you say that?" – and continues to interrupt Seagoon's speech, further asking if the walls have been measured. When he introduces the possibility that the walls might be ten feet six inches thick and refuses to accept the blame for this shortcoming, their argument causes an uproar until a second, elderly MP (voiced by Milligan) calms the two down. The first MP apologises to Seagoon, who accepts his apology. Before he can continue his speech, the first MP interrupts again: "Captain Seagoon! You say you accept my apology. Why do you say that?", causing Seagoon to collapse in tears and parliament to descend into chaos.

== Bibliography ==
- Farnes, Norma, ed. (6 November 1997). The Goons: The Story. London: Virgin Publishing. ISBN 1-85227-679-7. — includes chapters from Milligan, Secombe & Sykes.
- Wilmut, Roger; Jimmy Grafton (1976). The Goon Show Companion - A History and Goonography. London: Robson Books. ISBN 0-903895-64-1.
