= The Dreaded Batter Pudding Hurler (of Bexhill-on-Sea) =

Episode of The Goon Show (BBC comedy series)

The Dreaded Batter-Pudding Hurler of Bexhill-on-Sea is an episode from series five of the 1950s BBC radio comedy The Goon Show, first broadcast on 12 October 1954. It was written by Spike Milligan, who chose Bexhill-on-Sea as the location because he had been stationed there in World War II.

The episode is a noted example of the use of a belief world in drama, and has been described as humour that demands "visualisation where visualisation is patently unprofitable". One device used for comic effect is to disorient the listener by mismatching sound effects with the spoken word, such as by playing the sound of bagpipes but saying that a taxi has arrived.

== Plot summary ==
The show starts with Henry Crun and Minnie Bannister walking about on the English coast. The year is 1941, and the pair converse briefly about elephants, before Minnie is struck down from behind by an unknown object. Constable Neddie Seagoon arrives, but warns them they can't use lights to see what the object is because of the blackout. Waiting until morning, they discover that the object is in fact a batter pudding. Seagoon mentions that he must inform the inspector, and proceeds to jump into the ocean. As he swims ashore, he dries himself to save time. He spends the rest of the night in his dustbin, where he is hit by a batter pudding.

Wallace Greenslade then states that in the months to come, 38 batter puddings were hurled at Minnie Bannister. Seagoon discovers an army boot inside the most recent pudding, and travels to the nearby army camp. Major Bloodnok is the commanding officer, and is displeased at having to get his men out of bed in the middle of the day. Seagoon is searching for a man wearing one boot, but the entire platoon is bare footed. It begins to get dark, but by the light of 'a passing glue factory', Neddie notices that Lance-Private Eccles is only wearing one boot, on his head. Seagoon cannot prove a case against him, however. The next morning, a cold batter pudding is thrown at Minnie, revealing that the hurler has had his gas cut off. Obtaining a list of people who haven't paid their gas bills, Seagoon then mistakenly calls Prime Minister Winston Churchill, but quickly hangs up, wondering who Churchill could want to throw a batter pudding at. Immediately the phone rings; it's Clement Attlee, complaining that someone's just thrown a batter pudding at him.

Seagoon encounters Moriarty dressed as a chef and pulling a portable gas stove from which comes the smell of batter pudding, but dismisses him as irrelevant to the investigation. It is finally discovered that the hurler is in Africa, and Seagoon and Bluebottle travel there on a ship disguised as a train, done up like a boat and painted to appear like a tram. After the ship is destroyed by a mine which Eccles considers not to be a problem because "it's one of ours", Neddie and Bloodnok are left adrift in a lifeboat. They eventually discover the hurler hiding in an oven on board the raft, but having no evidence other than a batter pudding, Seagoon will not let Bloodnok or himself eat it to avoid starvation. Greenslade then ends the show after introducing a coda "for those of you cretins who would like a happy ending": Seagoon, over a background of romantic music, proposes marriage. Bloodnok accepts.

At times during the episode the plot is abandoned in favour of Milligan's associational comedy.
