= A Show Called Fred =

1956 British TV comedy series

- Episode 5's title card.
- Written by: Spike Milligan
- Starring: Peter Sellers; Spike Milligan; Valentine Dyall; Kenneth Connor; Graham Stark; Patti Lewis; Max Geldray
- Opening theme: "Ying Tong Song"
- Country of origin: United Kingdom
- No. of episodes: 5

Production
- Running time: 30 minutes

Original release
- Network: Associated-Rediffusion
- Release: 2 May – 30 May 1956

A Show Called Fred is a sketch comedy series best known for being an early television work by Peter Sellers and Spike Milligan, then both regular performers on the BBC Home Service as two-thirds of the cast of The Goon Show. Directed by Richard Lester, it starred Sellers, Milligan, Valentine Dyall, Kenneth Connor and Graham Stark – principal contributors it shared with The Idiot Weekly, Price 2d, a comedy show which had finished only a month before. Its five 30-minute episodes were made by and broadcast in London only by Associated-Rediffusion, the London weekday contractor for ITV.

It was predominantly a sketch comedy, attempting to translate the audio antics of The Goon Show into visual antics in bizarre and often surreal comedy sketches. Jazz harmonica player Max Geldray had a music segment in the show, reprising his role from The Goon Show, and Canadian star Patti Lewis had a singing spot. Performers including Mario Fabrizi, Ernest Clark, Patricia Driscoll, Jon Jon Keefe, Jennifer Lautrec and John Vyvyan had roles over the show's run. Contemporary celebrities such as Hans and Lotte Hass were parodied. There were a few taboos, with sketches showing people in various states of undress, cameramen, behind the scenes workers and the studios.

The "Ying Tong Song", written by Milligan, served as the show's opening theme, and became a hit on the UK Singles Chart when released in September 1956.

A Show Called Fred provoked strong reactions upon broadcast for its unusual content. The People reported that the show had received more telephone complaints than any other ITV show for being difficult to understand. Reviewing the programme in the Daily Mirror, Clifford Davis described it as "the most meaningless, weird, un-funny piffle ever to have been perpetrated on TV". In other quarters, the show garnered critical acclaim. Kenneth Baily of The People described it as "a new approach to TV fun" and "just as original as the Goons and radio's inimitable It's That Man Again". Writing for Truth, Denis Thomas singled out the show from any other comedy show on television, describing it as "so televisually funny: this, for once, is a variety programme which owes nothing at all to gramophone records or to the Palladium, or even to cabaret". Thomas's comments were echoed by Truth's Bernard Levin, who noted that the show had been "hailed in many quarters as not only the funniest thing that has ever been seen on television, but as the first programmes to exploit the full resources of the newest medium in a manner which owes nothing to the methods of any older one".

It was followed by Son of Fred later in 1956. A half-hour special, Best of Fred, was broadcast on 18 September 1963 combining surviving sketches from A Show Called Fred and Son of Fred. The 1995 convention of the Goon Show Preservation Society was billed as A Weekend Called Fred, followed in 2003 by its successor, the Great Grandson of a Weekend Called Fred, held in Egham, Surrey.

Although the series's fifth episode has previously been available to stream on BFI Player, as of September 2023 it is no longer available.
