= Son of Fred =

1956 British TV comedy series

- Written by: Spike Milligan
- Starring: Peter Sellers; Spike Milligan; Valentine Dyall; Kenneth Connor; Graham Stark; Patti Lewis; Max Geldray; John Vyvyan; Mario Fabrizi
- Country of origin: United Kingdom
- No. of episodes: 8

Production
- Running time: 30 minutes
- Production company: Associated-Rediffusion

Original release
- Network: ITV
- Release: 17 September – 5 November 1956

Related
- The Idiot Weekly, Price 2d; A Show Called Fred

Son of Fred is the successor series to The Idiot Weekly, Price 2d and A Show Called Fred. It was made by Associated-Rediffusion for ITV, which at the time was available only in the London area, the Midlands and Northern England.

It was the third and final in a series of sketch comedy shows attempting to translate the humour of The Goon Show to television. Spike Milligan concentrated on writing and only made small walk on appearances, leaving the lead acting to Peter Sellers. The series was produced and directed by Richard Lester.

== Impact on comedy and culture ==
The minimalist format, with little or no scenery and few props, sketches without any real purpose or punch line, and mixing live action and short animations directly influenced the format of Monty Python's Flying Circus. The unconventional format was revived in Spike Milligan's Q series more than a decade later.

A half hour special Best of Fred was broadcast on 18 September 1963 combining surviving sketches from A Show Called Fred and Son of Fred.

The 1997 convention of the Goon Show Preservation Society was billed as Son of a Weekend Called Fred.

== Archive status ==
The show is believed lost, with the exception of the first episode, which is available to stream on BFI Player.
