= Ying Tong Song =

Song by the Goons with Maurice Ponke and His Orchestre Fromage
- A-side: "Bloodnok's Rock 'n' Roll Call"
- Released: 20 September 1956
- Genre: Novelty song; nonsense song
- Length: 3:29
- Label: Decca
- Songwriter(s): Spike Milligan
- Producer(s): Marcel Stellman

The "Ying Tong Song" (also known by its refrain, which is variously either "Ying tong diddle I po" or "Ying tong yiddle I po" rather than the oft-quoted but apparently absent "Ying tong iddle I po") is a novelty song written by Spike Milligan and performed by the Goons, usually led by Harry Secombe. It is a nonsense song, consisting of small verses interspersed by a completely nonsensical chorus. The origin of the title is said to have come from Harry Secombe's mispronunciation of the name of Milligan's war-time friend and fellow jazz musician, Harry Edgington. When Secombe repeatedly called him "Edgerton", Milligan replied, "it's Edgington, Edgington" and emphasized the point by saying "Yington, Yingtang".

== The Goons ==
Secombe usually spoke the lead vocals, accompanied by Peter Sellers and Spike Milligan, who would sing along as various Goon Show characters. As Secombe was signed to Philips Records, he did not sing on any of the Goons' Decca recordings of the 1950s, including this song, only speaking his words.

Milligan claimed that he wrote this song as a bet, with his brother, that he could not get a song into the hit parade that had only two chords (in this case G and D7).

It was a hit in the UK on two occasions: its highest position was No. 3 in the UK Singles Chart in 1956 (the original A-side was "Bloodnok's Rock 'n' Roll Call") on Decca Records (catalogue no. F 10780), performed by The Goons featuring Major Dennis Bloodnok, Roland Rockcake and His Wholly Rollers, with "The Ying Tong Song" on the B-side performed by The Goons with Maurice Ponke and His Orchestre Fromage. "The Ying Tong Song" reached a position of No. 9 in the UK when re-issued in 1973. The guitar was played by the session musician Ivor Mairants. The song peaked at number 57 in Australia in 1973.

It was used as the title of the Roy Smiles play about Spike Milligan and The Goon Show: Ying Tong - A Walk With The Goons which was staged in the West End in 2005 and a radio play on BBC Radio 4 in 2009.

In the fourth volume of his war memoirs (Mussolini, His Part In My Downfall), Milligan mentions that his friend and fellow soldier Edgington was often referred to as Edge-Ying-Tong. Harry Edgington later settled in New Zealand.

== Later versions ==
In the satirical TV sketch show Spitting Image, in which news figures and celebrities were lampooned in the form of grossly caricatured rubber puppets, it was not uncommon for King Charles III (then the Prince of Wales) to be seen leaving a room quietly singing the "Ying Tong Song" to himself. This was a reference to the fact that the King is a fan of the Goon Show.

The song was the first track of a 1979 comedy album, Primeval Slime by actor Ying Tong John.

The song gave its name to the 2008 stage show Ying Tong: A Walk With the Goons.

The Muppets also did a cover version of the "Ying Tong Song" in season 5, episode 20 of The Muppet Show.

Jon Anderson, former lead singer for the progressive rock group Yes, recorded a short version, released in 2005 on his State of Independence EP.

In the Funny Woman television series, whenever the title character, Barbara/Sophie, and her father part or end a phone call they say "ying tong iddle i po." Spike Milligan is a character in season 1 episode 5.

== Charts ==
Chart (1956)	Peak position
UK Singles (OCC)	3
