= The Omar Khayyam Show =

Australian radio comedy program starring Spike Milligan

The Omar Khayyam Show is a 1963 BBC radio comedy programme, written by Spike Milligan based on six episodes of his The Idiot Weekly made for the Australian Broadcasting Commission in 1958–1962.

The cast was Spike Milligan, John Bluthal, Bob Todd, Bill Kerr and Barry Humphries with music by George Chisholm & his Jolly Jazzers. Bluthal had also appeared in two of the three series of The Idiot Weekly. Brian Wilde appears in episode 1 and Tim Gudgin in episodes 2–6, whilst in one episode Barry Humphries is heard doing a character voice similar to Dame Edna Everage's. The producer was Charles Chilton who had also produced some episodes of The Goon Show, on which The Idiot Weekly was based.

It was broadcast weekly from 27 December 1963. The episodes were (in broadcast order) Ned Kelly, The Ashes, The Prime Minister's Trousers, The Flying Dustmen, The America Cup and Waltzing Matilda. The scripts had minor changes to remove some references to Australian locations and personalities unfamiliar to British audiences. However, some better known personalities remained, notably Sir Donald Bradman.

Episode	Title	Original broadcast date	Preservation
1	Ned Kelly	27 December 1963	Edited BBC "ring main" (internal distribution system) recording, and unedited domestic off-air recording
2	The Ashes	3 January 1964	Domestic off-air recordings
3	The Prime Minister's Trousers	10 January 1964	Domestic off-air recordings
4	The Flying Dustman	17 January 1964	Unedited BBC Sound Archives copy
5	The America Cup	24 January 1964	Edited BBC "ring main" recording, and unedited domestic off-air recording
6	Waltzing Matilda	5 May 1964	Domestic off-air recordings

== Commercial release ==
The complete series has been released on CD as bonus material on The Goon Show Compendium Volume 11 (2015), comprising the best available recordings as detailed above, compiled into complete episodes and remastered by restoration expert Ted Kendall.
