= The Idiot Weekly =

- Genre: Comedy
- Running time: 30 minutes
- Country of origin: Australia
- Home station: Australian Broadcasting Commission
- Starring: Spike Milligan; John Bluthal; Bobby Limb; Michael Eisdell; Ray Barrett; Peter Carver; John Ewart
- Original release: 1958 – 1962
- No. of episodes: 38

The Idiot Weekly (1958–1962) was a radio program made by the Australian Broadcasting Commission.

Episodes of The Goon Show were broadcast on Australian radio from late 1955. When Spike Milligan visited his parents in Woy Woy in 1958, the Australian Broadcasting Commission signed him for a series of radio comedy broadcasts. They hoped for a local equivalent of The Goon Show with an Australian slant to it, but without Peter Sellers and Harry Secombe.

== Format and characters ==
The format was very similar to The Goon Show, with Milligan recycling or adapting scripts and jokes for the new show. The show contained typical Goonish humour and some of Milligan's Goon Show characters, notably Eccles, made regular appearances. However it was distinctly Australian with plots translated to Australian locations and frequent references to topical events and Australian political figures of the time.

The closing credits were "a radio reading of The Idiot Weekly" with the actors credited as "Headlines by.." or "Cartoons by..." and the producer credited as a sub-editor.

Many episodes include references to the perceived poor state of the ABC, usually by the announcer. For example, "This is the Australian Broadcasting Commission and it's going bald" or "This is the ABC, and the roof leaks". These are similar to The Goon Show's references to the BBC, e.g. "This is the BBC Home Service." (Coin dropped into charity tin) "Thank you."

Most episodes include references to Woy Woy.

== Broadcast episode sheet ==
=== Series 1 ===
The first series was broadcast in 1958, and spanned three years, and broadcast as a weekly series of 12 episodes, it was produced by Max Greaves and starred Milligan alongside other cast members including John Bluthal, Bobby Limb, Michael Eisdell and Ray Barrett. Music was by Tim Gussey and the ABC Dance Orchestra.

Episode	Broadcast Date	Title
1–1	3 June 1958	
1–2	10 June 1958	
1–3	17 June 1958	
1–4	24 June 1958	
1–5	1 July 1958	
1–6	8 July 1958	
1–7	15 July 1958	
1–8	22 July 1958	
1–9	29 July 1958	
1–10	5 August 1958	
1–11	12 August 1958	The All Australian Leather Rocket
1–12	19 August 1958	

=== Series 2 ===
The series was produced by John McCloud with cast Spike Milligan, Bobby Limb, John Bluthal, Peter Carver, Michael Eisdell, announcer Graham Connolly with music by Johnny Bamford (vibraphone), Bruce Findlay (vocals), Jim Gussey and featuring the ABC Dance Orchestra.

Episode	Broadcast Date	Title
2–1	30 June 1959	Son of Andrea
2–2	7 July 1959	
2–3	14 July 1959	
2–4	21 July 1959	
2–5	28 July 1959	
2–6	4 August 1959	
2–7	11 August 1959	
2–8	18 August 1959	
2–9	25 August 1959	
2–10	1 September 1959	
2–11	8 September 1959	The French Connection
2–12	15 September 1959	
2–13	22 September 1959	The Australian Flag

Broadcast dates unknown: The Prime Minister's Trousers, The First Australian into Outer Woy Woy

=== Series 3 ===
The series was produced by John McCloud, with cast Spike Milligan, John Ewart, Ric Hutton, Paul Westerman, Al Thoma, and Michael Eisdell, announcer Peter Young, with music by Patricia Ridgeway (vocals), Dudley Stapleton (piano), Jim Gussey and featuring the ABC Dance Orchestra.

Episode	Broadcast Date
3–1	28 August 1962
3–2	4 September 1962
3–3	11 September 1962
3–4	18 September 1962
3–5	25 September 1962
3–6	2 October 1962
3–7	9 October 1962
3–8	16 October 1962
3–9	23 October 1962
3–10	30 October 1962
3–11	6 November 1962
3–12	13 November 1962
3–13	20 November 1962

Broadcast dates unknown: The Ashes, The King's Bridge Saga, The American Cup, The World's Greatest Adventure, The Spon Plague, King's Cross - The East Berlin of Australia, The Great Christmas Pudding, The Flying Dustman of the Outback.

== Notes ==
- Some published sources list The Australian Flag and The Prime Minister's Trousers as being in Series 1. Both credit the Series 2 cast. The Australian Flag is announced as "the last of the present series".
- The surviving recording of The First Australian into Outer Woy Woy includes the audience warm up, which includes a short jazz number by the ABC Dance Band with Spike Milligan playing the trumpet.
- The Spon Plague combines elements of The Goon Show's Lurgi Strikes Britain and The Nadger Plague. Some publications list this episode title as The Spon Berry vs The Spon Plague or just Spon. The show is announced as The Spon Plague. In this episode, Spike Milligan sings a version of the Dustbin Dance from the BBC television series A Show Called Fred, the successor to The Idiot Weekly, Price 2d.
- The Great Christmas Pudding is essentially a remake of The Goon Show Operation Christmas Duff with Australian references.
- Some publications list The American Cup as Gretel vs America.
- Some publications list The King's Bridge Saga as The King's Bridge Disaster or The Last Tram to King Street Bridge. The show is announced as The King's Bridge Saga. It contains elements of The Goon Show: The Last Tram (from Clapham). Part of the episode relates to the King Street Bridge in Melbourne which collapsed soon after opening in July 1962.
- Patricia Ridgeway had married Spike Milligan several months prior to series 3.

== Recordings ==
The ABC did not keep all the episodes but a few recordings do survive. Some episodes were recorded off air onto acetate and are held in the archives of The Goon Show Preservation Society and in private collections.

Known surviving recordings are:
Season 1 - Program from 8 July 1958 (partial), The All Australian Leather Rocket (complete).
Season 2 - Son of Andrea (complete), The First Australian into Outer Woy Woy (with audience warm up), The Prime Minister's Trousers (complete with audience warm up), The French Connection (rehearsal), The Australian Flag (complete)
Season 3 - The Ashes (off air recording without music), The King's Bridge Saga (off air recording without music), The American Cup (complete), The World's Greatest Adventure, The Spon Plague, King's Cross - The East Berlin of Australia (without music), The Great Christmas Pudding, The Flying Dustman of the Outback (off air recording without music).

== Adaptations and audio releases ==
Two episodes from Series 3, The Ashes and The Flying Dustman of the Outback, were released on Parlophone LP (PMEO 9376) in 1962.

Six episodes were remade by the BBC as The Omar Khayyam Show.
