= Richard Lester =

American film director (born 1932)

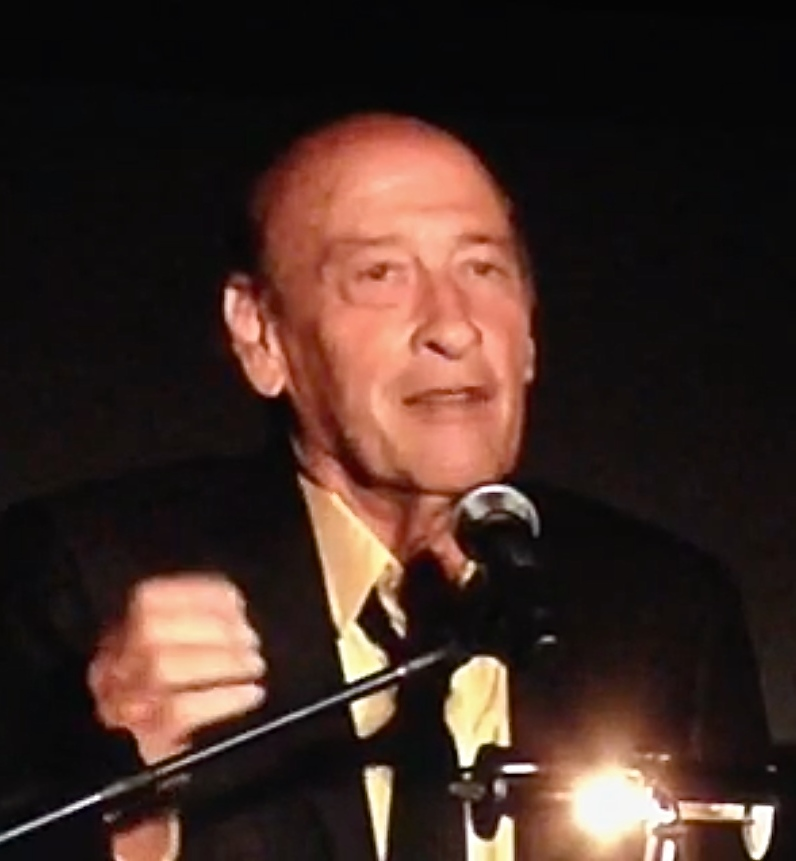
- Lester in 2014
- Born: Richard Lester Liebman; January 19, 1932 (age 94); Philadelphia, Pennsylvania, U.S.
- Other name: Dick Lester
- Education: University of Pennsylvania (BA)
- Occupation: Film director
- Years active: 1959–2006
- Known for: A Hard Day's Night; Help!; The Knack ...and How to Get It; A Funny Thing Happened on the Way to the Forum; How I Won the War; Petulia; The Three Musketeers; Superman II; Superman III
- Spouse: Deirdre Smith (m. 1956)
- Children: 1

Richard Lester Liebman (born January 19, 1932) is a retired American film director. He spent the majority of his professional life in the United Kingdom and is known for the fast-paced, flamboyant directing he brought to his comedy films, most notably the Beatles' vehicles A Hard Day's Night (1964) and Help! (1965), and The Knack ...and How to Get It (1965).

Originally from Philadelphia, Lester began his career directing television, moving to the United Kingdom in the mid-1950s. He collaborated with Peter Sellers and Spike Milligan on The Goon Show and The Running Jumping & Standing Still Film. After breaking into film directing through his Beatles collaborations, he helmed various productions including A Funny Thing Happened on the Way to the Forum (1966), How I Won the War (1967), Petulia (1968), The Three Musketeers (1973) and its two sequels, Robin and Marian (1976), Butch and Sundance: The Early Days (1979), and the superhero films Superman II (1980) and Superman III (1983).

A two-time BAFTA Award nominee, Lester is an Honorary Associate of London Film School and a BFI Fellow. According to the British Film Institute, "if any single director can encapsulate the popular image of Britain in the Swinging Sixties, then it is probably Richard Lester. With his use of flamboyant cinematic devices and liking for zany humour, he captured the vitality, and sometimes the triviality, of the period more vividly than any other director."

== Early life ==
Richard Lester Liebman was born on January 19, 1932, to a Jewish family in Philadelphia. A child prodigy, he graduated from the William Penn Charter School, a Quaker school in Philadelphia, and began studies at the University of Pennsylvania at the age of 15, graduating with a degree in clinical psychology in 1951.

== Early career ==
=== American television ===
Lester started in television in 1950, working as a stage hand, floor manager, assistant director, and eventually a director in less than a year, because no one else was around who knew how to do the work.

Lester was the music director on Action in the Afternoon, an American western television series that aired live on CBS from February 2, 1953, to January 29, 1954. The series originated from the studios and back lot of CBS's WCAU-TV, which was then in Philadelphia; it was broadcast Monday through Friday regardless of the weather. The half-hour series aired variously at 3:30 pm or 4:00 pm, throughout its run.

=== British television ===
In May 1955, after a period spent busking around continental Europe, Lester moved to London and began work as a director in television, working for the low-budget producers the Danziger Brothers on episodes of Mark Saber, a half-hour detective series.

He worked as a writer on Curtains for Harry (1955) and for a few weeks, The Barris Beat (1956).

A variety show he produced caught the eye of Peter Sellers, who enlisted Lester's help in translating The Goon Show to television as The Idiot Weekly, Price 2d (1956). It was a hit as were two follow-up shows: A Show Called Fred (1956) and Son of Fred (1956).

Lester recalled that A Show Called Fred was "broadcast live and that's why I went into film directing where you can do a second take!"

He wrote and directed episodes of the TV series After Hours (1958).

=== Early films ===
Lester received acclaim with The Running Jumping & Standing Still Film (1959), a short film he made with Spike Milligan and Peter Sellers. He did another short titled The Sound of Jazz (1959).

His first feature as director was It's Trad, Dad! (1962), a low-budget musical. His second was The Mouse on the Moon (1963), produced by Walter Shenson for United Artists starring Margaret Rutherford, a sequel to The Mouse That Roared (1959). He returned to TV, directing episodes of Room at the Bottom (1964).

== The Beatles and "The Swinging '60s" ==
The Running Jumping & Standing Still Film was a favourite of the Beatles, particularly John Lennon. When the band members were contracted to make a feature film, they chose Lester from a list of possible directors. A Hard Day's Night (1964) showed an exaggerated and simplified version of the Beatles' characters and proved to be an effective marketing tool. Many of its stylistic innovations survive as the forerunner of music videos; in particular, the multi-angle filming of a live performance. Lester was sent an award from MTV as "Father of the Music Video".

A Hard Day's Night was a huge critical and commercial success. Lester then directed the first of several quintessential "swinging" films, the sex comedy The Knack... and How to Get It (1965). It was the first of three of his films with actor Michael Crawford, and the first out of four credited collaborations with screenwriter Charles Wood. The film won the Palme d'Or at the Cannes Film Festival.

Lester followed The Knack... and How to Get It with the Beatles film Help! (1965). A spoof of the popular James Bond spy thrillers, it was the second collaboration with screenwriter Charles Wood and another huge commercial success. Lester received a Hollywood offer to direct the film adaptation of A Funny Thing Happened on the Way to the Forum (1966).

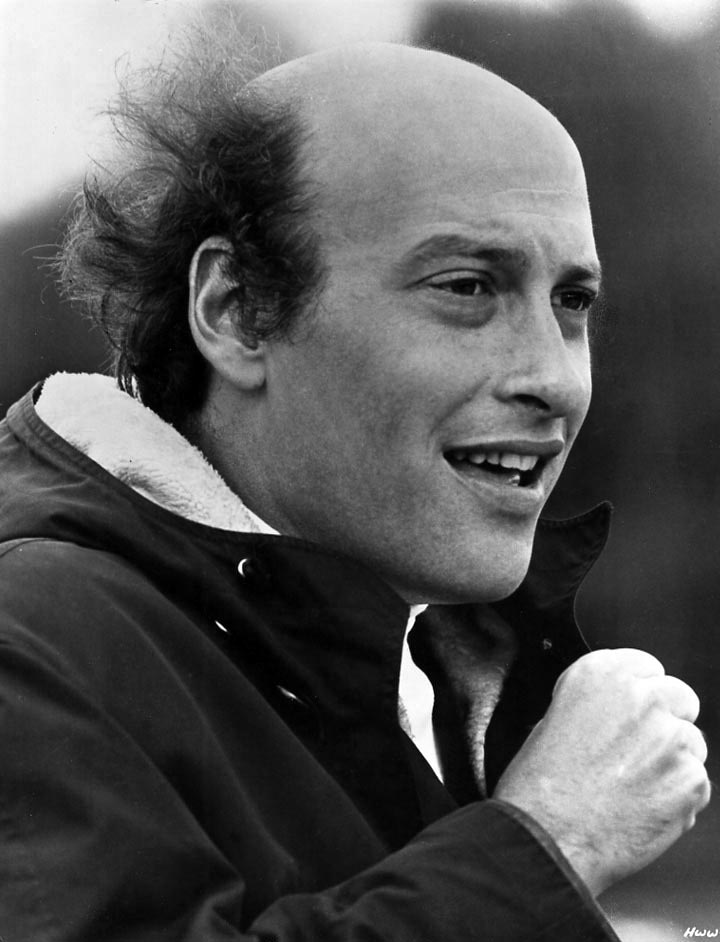
Director Richard Lester on the set of How I Won the War in 1967

He then made the darkly surreal, satirical anti-war movie How I Won the War (1967) co-starring Crawford and Lennon, which Lester referred to as an "anti-anti-war movie". Although set in World War II, the film serves as an oblique reference to the Vietnam War, and at one point, breaking the fourth wall, references this directly.

He made Petulia (1968) with Julie Christie and George C. Scott, and a score by John Barry (who had also scored The Knack). He returned to his anti-war theme with the post-apocalyptic black comedy The Bed Sitting Room (1969), based on a play by Spike Milligan and John Antrobus. The screenplay was the fourth credited collaboration between Lester and Charles Wood, but Wood provided uncredited production rewrites for more films of Lester.

How I Won the War and Bed Sitting Room performed poorly at the box office; Lester found himself unable to raise funds for a series of projects, including an adaptation of the Flashman novels.

== Swashbucklers and adventurers ==
Lester's career revived when he was hired by Alexander and Ilya Salkind to do a version of The Three Musketeers (1973), based on a script by George MacDonald Fraser. The producers decided to split the first film into two after principal photography was completed, the second titled The Four Musketeers (1974). Many of the cast principals complained to the Salkinds, stating that they were only contracted to make one film, and they arrived at an agreement to avoid attorneys' fees. Both movies were critically and commercially successful.

He was called in at the last minute as a replacement director on Juggernaut (1974), a thriller set on a cruise liner. The success of the Musketeers films enabled Lester to raise the finances for Royal Flash (1975), based on the second of the Flashman novels by George MacDonald Fraser. Lester followed Royal Flash with Robin and Marian (1976) which was adapted from a script by James Goldman and starred Sean Connery and Audrey Hepburn. He then made The Ritz (1976) which was based on a play by Terrence McNally.

Lester also directed Butch and Sundance: The Early Days (1979) and Cuba (1979) with Connery; neither film was successful commercially.

=== Superman ===
Lester's next film, Superman II, was a huge success. Initial production on Superman II occurred simultaneously with Superman, but work had to be halted to concentrate on getting the first movie completed. After Superman was released in late 1978, the Salkinds went back into production on Superman II without informing Superman director Richard Donner and placing Lester behind the camera to complete the film. Although Donner had shot approximately 75 percent of the footage needed for the sequel, much of his footage was jettisoned or reshot during Lester's time on the project so he could claim the director's credit.

Gene Hackman, who played Lex Luthor, refused to return for the reshoots, so Lester instead used a body double to insert the character into new scenes, as well as a voice impersonator to record additional dialogues and occasionally loop Luthor's lines onto footage of Hackman shot by Donner. Some of Donner's original footage was integrated into television versions of the film. In November 2006, Donner's footage was re-edited into Superman II: The Richard Donner Cut, consisting primarily of his footage with Lester's footage used only for scenes not shot during Donner's principal photography of the movie.

Richard Lester directed Superman III (1983), but this third installment was not as well received as its predecessors. Nonetheless, it was considered a box office success, ranking 14th in that year's worldwide box office.

== Later films and retirement ==
In 1984, Lester directed the comedy Finders Keepers, starring Michael O'Keefe, Louis Gossett Jr., and Beverly D'Angelo. It had a domestic total gross of $1,467,396. The film generally received good reviews. Richard Freedman in his review published in The Montana Standard found the film to be "wonderfully wacky" and concluded that "a movie consisting almost entirely of pratfalls and sight gags can wear you down after a while, but everybody involved in Finders Keepers ensures, that this is one comedy that makes nobody in the audience a loser or a weeper."

In 1988, he reunited most of the Three Musketeers cast to film The Return of the Musketeers, released the following year. During filming in Spain, actor Roy Kinnear, a close friend of Lester, died after falling from a horse. Lester finished the film, then retired from directing. He returned only once more to direct Paul McCartney's concert film Get Back (1991).

In 1993, he presented Hollywood U.K., a five-part series on British cinema in the 1960s for the BBC.

Director Steven Soderbergh is among many who have called for a reappraisal of Lester's work and influence. He wrote Getting Away with It, published in 1999 about Lester's career; the book consists of interviews with Lester.

In 2012, the British Film Institute awarded Lester a Fellowship, the British film industry's highest honour, in recognition of his work. The award was presented in a public ceremony on March 22 at the National Film Theatre, and was followed by a screening of Lester's Robin and Marian. The citation for his fellowship recognises that "Richard Lester has created a unique body of work which has enriched the lives of millions with his brilliantly surreal humour and innovative style. Although born in the US, he has lived in Britain for 60 years and created some of the most enduring and influential creations of British cinema."

== Personal life ==
Lester and his wife, Deirdre have been married since 1956. They met while she was working in his office. The couple have a son.

In Soderbergh's book Getting Away with It, Lester reveals that he is a committed atheist and debates with Soderbergh (who was then an agnostic), largely based on the arguments of Richard Dawkins. While Lester studied at the University of Pennsylvania, he was a member of the Beta Rho Chapter of the Sigma Nu fraternity.

== Filmography ==
- The Running Jumping & Standing Still Film (1959) (short)
- It's Trad, Dad! (1962)
- The Mouse on the Moon (1963)
- A Hard Day's Night (1964)
- The Knack ...and How to Get It (1965)
- Help! (1965)
- A Funny Thing Happened on the Way to the Forum (1966)
- How I Won the War (also producer, 1967)
- Petulia (1968)
- The Bed Sitting Room (also producer, 1969)
- The Three Musketeers (1973)
- Juggernaut (1974)
- The Four Musketeers (1974)
- Royal Flash (1975)
- Robin and Marian (1976)
- The Ritz (1976)
- Superman (producer uncredited, 1978)
- Butch and Sundance: The Early Days (1979)
- Cuba (1979)
- Superman II (1980)
- Superman III (1983)
- Finders Keepers (1984)
- The Return of the Musketeers (1989)
- Get Back (1991)
- Superman II: The Richard Donner Cut (director uncredited, re-edited director's cut of Superman II, 2006)
