= The Idiot Weekly, Price 2d =

1956 British TV comedy series

- Written by: Dave Freeman; John Junkin; Spike Milligan; Terry Nation; Eric Sykes
- Starring: Peter Sellers; Spike Milligan; Eric Sykes; Valentine Dyall; Kenneth Connor; Graham Stark; June Whitfield; Patti Lewis; Max Geldray
- Country of origin: United Kingdom
- No. of episodes: 6

Production
- Running time: 30 minutes

Original release
- Network: Associated-Rediffusion
- Release: 24 February – 30 March 1956

The Idiot Weekly, Price 2d is a 1956 British television series produced and directed by Richard Lester. Although written mainly by Spike Milligan, there were many contributions from members of Associated London Scripts, the writers' co-operative, including Dave Freeman, John Junkin and Terry Nation. Eric Sykes was credited as the script editor. It was made by Associated-Rediffusion during 1956 and was broadcast only in the London area.

It was the first real attempt to translate the humour of The Goon Show to television. It combined elements of a sitcom and sketch comedy with Peter Sellers as the editor of a fictional tatty Victorian newspaper, The Idiot Weekly. The headlines of the paper were used as links to comedy sketches.

It was followed in the same year by A Show Called Fred and Son of Fred. The title was revived by Milligan for his 1958 Australian radio series The Idiot Weekly.

== Cast ==
- Peter Sellers
- Graham Stark
- Valentine Dyall
- Kenneth Connor
- Patti Lewis
- Spike Milligan
- Eric Sykes
- June Whitfield
