= Goon Show Preservation Society =

British non-profit organisation

The Goon Show Preservation Society is a non-profit organisation, formed to help preserve and research the history of the Goon Show. The society, founded in 1972, maintains an archive of Goon Show material, often used by professional researchers and media organisations, including the BBC. The society also owns the Neddie Seagoon puppet from The Telegoons.

It no longer has formal regional groups within the United Kingdom but maintains international representation in Australia, Canada, South Africa, the United States, Germany and Japan.

King Charles III, then Prince Charles, became patron of the society in 1998 and continued his patronage following his ascension to the throne.

Honorary presidents of the society are John Antrobus, Spike Milligan's daughter, Jane Milligan, and Michael Coveney. Sir Harry Secombe, Spike Milligan and Eric Sykes were honorary presidents until their deaths in 2001, 2002 and 2012, respectively.

The GSPS produces a full colour, A5 quarterly magazine: March, July, September and December. This comes free for an annual membership subscription. The magazine features new finds relating to The Goon Show and to each of the four Goons as well as delving into the history of the show itself and other productions by the members. It also concerns itself with the production team of this and all associated radio and television shows. Feature articles focussing on radio shows, television programmes, records, books and films appear in each issue. Issue number 170 was published in December 2021. A new official website was launched in September 2022.

In 2026, the GSPS marked the 75th anniversary of The Goon Show with a special event at the University of York's Borthwick Institute for Archives. This included a performance of Birmingham Comedy Festival's live recreation. The Institute currently holds the GSPS archive.
