= Henry Crun and Minnie Bannister =

Characters from radio comedy The Goon Show

Henry Crun and Minnie Bannister are two characters from the 1950s United Kingdom radio comedy series The Goon Show. Crun and Min were performed by Peter Sellers and Spike Milligan respectively.

They are both elderly and often play significant roles in the story, frequently in occupations for which they seem ill-suited, such as the crew of a lifeboat, lighthouse keepers, Head of MI5, or the staff of the East Acton Volunteer Auxiliary Civilian Fire Brigade. "Modern Min" is a fan of modern, sinful dancing and music and her music drives Henry wild, whether playing Paganini on the soup spoon while stirring soup with a violin, flirting with George Chisholm's trombone or performing on the saxophone. In the episode "The Dreaded Batter Pudding Hurler" Henry introduces her as "Minnie Bannister, the world-famous poker player – give her a good poker and she'll play any tune you like."

Crun is extremely jealous of Major Bloodnok because of a past romance between Bloodnok and Minnie. Crun is unable to do anything about this, however, because he and Bloodnok are both played by Peter Sellers. In the episode "The Evils of Bushy Spon" he manages to confront Bloodnok by appearing on a gramophone record.

Both Crun and Minnie would often welcome others by repeatedly saying, "Morrrrrning!" Another of Crun's catchphrases was "You can't get the wood, you know ...". Minnie's catchphrase is "we'll all be murdered in our beds", and often refers to other characters as 'buddy'. It is also strongly insinuated that she has a weakness for alcohol and things it wouldn't be safe for humans to drink, like rubbing alcohol and spirit gum and has a tendecy to pepper her conversations with random high-pitched sounds, scat singing and vocal percussion. They have many ways of taking a long time to answer the door, such as a humorous sketch when FX make it sound as if Minnie is walking down several long flights of stairs. This goes on for about a minute, until Henry says "I can't understand it, we live in a bungalow!"

In a drawn-out gag in "The Affair of the Lone Banana" Henry Crun asks Neddie Seagoon for many details, usually more than once, asking him to spell everything and even falling asleep before saying; "it's no good, I'll have to get a pencil and paper and write all this down."

In "The Dreaded Batter Pudding Hurler of Bexhill-on-Sea", they survive both German and British bombing after lighting a match to see a batter pudding that had been hurled at Minnie.

In the episode "The Macreekie Rising of '74", Sellers had to do the voice role of Minnie Bannister in Milligan's absence.

== Spin-offs ==
Jef Raskin once ran a technical-writing firm called Bannister & Crun, which produced manuals for computers and software and which eventually became the Publications Department at Apple.
