= Hercules Grytpype-Thynne =

Character from the Goon Show

Hercules Grytpype-Thynne was a character from the British 1950s comedy radio programme The Goon Show. He was voiced by Peter Sellers. In the episode "Who Is Pink Oboe?", Valentine Dyall filled-in for the role in Sellers' absence.

Grytpype-Thynne is the smooth spoken and sophisticated principal villain on the show, and is usually accompanied by his companion in crime, Count Jim Moriarty. The main plot usually follows an impoverished Grytpype-Thynne thinking up a money-making scheme which involves (the usually equally impoverished) Neddie Seagoon being the fall guy. In early scripts, however, Grytpype-Thynne was often cast as a government official, and not necessarily a villain. For instance in "The Dreaded Batter Pudding Hurler of Bexhill-on-Sea" he is a police inspector; in "The Whistling Spy Enigma" he is the secret Government agent who sends Neddie Seagoon to Hungary to booby-trap the boots of the national football team; and in "The Jet-Propelled Guided NAAFI" he is Prime Minister Neddie's butler and confidant, but also an undercover Soviet agent plotting with Moriarty to sell the guided NAAFI secrets to the Russians. In "The Histories of Pliny the Elder", he was Julius Caesar.

In later series, he and Moriarty are much further down the respectability scale, often found sharing the same suit, eating newspaper stew, or living up trees, in dustbins, in open drains, or on top of disused factory chimneys.

Grytpype-Thynne's relationship with Moriarty also goes downhill in later series; he often refers to Moriarty in very insulting tones. The lowest point appears in "The Pam's Paper Policy"; on the way out of Ray Ellington's musical piece, there is the prolonged sound of clubbing, mixed in with Moriarty's howls of pain, and Grytpype-Thynne says, "Let that clubbing be a lesson to you, you crutty French schlapper!"

Grytpype-Thynne sometimes offers Neddie things instead of cigarettes, such as gorillas or pictures of Queen Victoria. Seagoon's usual response is "No I'm trying to give them up", "No, they hurt my throat", or "I've just put one out". This happened most notably in "Rommel's Treasure", "The Great International Christmas Pudding" and "Napoleon's Piano".

Grytpype-Thynne often used the word "Charlie" (meaning a foolish or easily duped person) to refer to people (often Neddie Seagoon). His book of ideas for schemes, alphabetically ordered, reads, "A… B… C… Charlie." In another instance, in "The Jet-Propelled Guided NAAFI" Seagoon states that his name is not Charlie, to which Grytpype-Thynne responds, "I know, but for some reason I always think of you as Charlie". Having put one over on Seagoon, he and Moriarty would often break into song, singing "April in Pareess… We've found a Charlie".

Sellers drew inspiration for the character from actor George Sanders; the script of "The Dreaded Batter-Pudding Hurler of Bexhill on Sea" has the stage direction "Sanders throughout" next to the first appearance of Grytpype-Thynne.

In The Goon Show Scripts, published in 1972, it was posthumously revealed that Hercules Grytpype-Thynne was homosexual. The same authority also intimated that he was the half-brother of Willium "Mate" Cobblers, having the same mother, a certain "Vera Colin".

In some of the early episodes, the "y" in "Thynne" was pronounced as a hard I.
