= Bluebottle (character) =

Character from The Goon Show

Bluebottle is a comedy character from The Goon Show, a 1950s British comedy radio program. The character was created and performed by Peter Sellers.

Bluebottle is an adenoidal squeaky-voiced Boy Scout from East Finchley; this was the same neighbourhood of London where Peter Sellers grew up. He was noted for reading his own stage directions out loud, and was often greeted with a deliberate round of applause from the audience ("Enter Bluebottle wearing string and cardboard pyjamas. Waits for audience applause. Not a sausage"). As was common with Goon Show characters, Sellers' Bluebottle was paired with a Spike Milligan character, usually Eccles (the third Goon, Harry Secombe, usually stayed in his alter-ego of Neddie Seagoon throughout the show).

Bluebottle is also prone to humorous misnaming of characters, including himself; for example, he has referred to himself as "Blunebottle" and "Blatbottle" on occasion. Other characters are often misnamed as well, including "Count Morinanty" for Count Jim Moriarty, "Robinge Hoonjie" for Robin Hood and "Miss Balustrade" for Minnie Bannister. Neddie is always "My Capitan". In "The Yehti", he reads his own name as "Blunbintle". He is often offered candy for his assistance, which he states he plans to use to attract the romantic attentions of various girls in his school.

According to the 1976 book The Goon Show Companion, Bluebottle was originally known as Ernie Splutmuscle. In the third series episode "The Man Who Never Was", he was cast in a small role. Seagoon strides across the ceiling of his club, hurling members to the floor. He bumps into Splutmuscle:

Splutmuscle: No, do not hurl me to the floor.

Seagoon: Are you a member?
Splutmuscle: No, I'm a Bluebottle.
Seagoon: What's that you're reading?

Splutmuscle: A fly-paper.

Four shows later, in the episode "The Greatest Mountain in the World", the script refers to "Peter (Bluebottle)".

Early in season 5, Bluebottle would enter with a direct appeal to the audience: "Enter Bluebottle, waits for audience applause. Not a sausage". As the character became more popular, he would actually earn the applause that he sought, which he would acknowledge with a grateful, "Oh! Sausinges!" In later seasons, no request or response was needed: Bluebottle's entry into the show would generate a loud, sustained applause by itself.

Bluebottle was often killed, or "deaded", during the course of an episode. This would be punctuated by a lamentation such as, "You rotten swine, you! You have deaded me!" After a while, the character began to anticipate this fate, noting at the appearance of a dangerous prop that "the dreaded deading" is approaching. Bluebottle's "deading" became so regular that at the close of the season 6 episode "The Fear of Wages", he asks Wallace Greenslade to make a special announcement "that I have not been deaded this week".

== Origin ==
Bluebottle was based on Ruxton Hayward, a Scoutmaster Sellers once met. In an interview with Michael Parkinson, Sellers described trying to keep a straight face while talking with a large red-bearded Scout leader who nevertheless spoke in a falsetto voice and had an ingratiating manner. The identity of the individual was later revealed in The Goons, one of several books featuring memoirs and scripts from The Goon Show.
