= Eccles (character) =

Spike Milligan comedy character from the Goons

Eccles (/ˈɛkəlz/), also referred to as 'The Famous Eccles' or 'Mad Dan Eccles', is the name of a comedy character, created and performed by Spike Milligan, from the 1950s BBC radio comedy series The Goon Show. In the episode "The Macreekie Rising of '74", Peter Sellers had to fill in for the role in Milligan's absence. Very occasionally, he was referred to as 'Field Marshal' Eccles.

Eccles was one of the show's secondary characters, but like his counterpart Bluebottle (portrayed by Sellers), became extremely popular and he is regarded as epitomising the show's humour. The Eccles character and his distinctive voicing were strongly influenced by Milligan's childhood love for the classic Walt Disney cartoons and specifically Disney's anthropomorphic buffoon dog character Goofy.. When Milligan wrote The Idiot Weekly, an Australian version of The Goon Show, Eccles often made appearances in the script.

Milligan visualised Eccles as a tall, lanky, amiable, well-meaning, but incredibly stupid teenager who often found himself involved—usually alongside Bluebottle and Neddie Seagoon—in one of the nefarious schemes created by arch-villain Hercules Grytpype-Thynne. As well as being frequently referred to as being something other than an ordinary human, Eccles also possesses remarkable stupidity when dealing with physical objects; in "The Greatest Mountain in the World" he describes two sticks of dynamite as "What luck! Two big cigars and they're both lit!"
