= Neddie Seagoon =

Character in The Goon Show (BBC radio)

Neddie Seagoon was a character in the 1950s British radio comedy show The Goon Show. He was created and performed by Welsh comedian Harry Secombe. Seagoon was usually the central character of a Goon Show episode, with most plots involving or revolving around him.

An affable but gullible idiot, Neddie is often chronically poor and/or part of the Government (such as "The Strolling Prime Minister of No Fixed Address" or some other civil service title). Seagoon frequently falls prey to the schemes of Hercules Grytpype-Thynne (Sellers) and Count Jim Moriarty (Milligan), often alongside Bluebottle (Sellers), Eccles (Milligan), and Major Bloodnok (Sellers).

Sharing his actor's Welsh heritage, Neddie's appearance was also based on Secombe's own likeness, exaggerated for comic effect - often described as very short, round and immensely fat. He also suffers from duck's disease (short legs), and shares Secombe's tenor voice, as used to identify him in "The Mystery of the Fake Neddie Seagoons". He also appears to have been Major Bloodnok's batman at some point of time.

Alongside announcer Wallace Greenslade, Neddie often greeted the audience at the beginning of the show, referring to them as "folks" or "Dear Listeners". He would often step out of the frame of the story, explaining elements of the storyline to the audience or narrating some of the plot.

Seagoon had several catch-phrases, seemingly random gibberish that became his trademarks, such as "Ying tong yiddle I po!” (followed by a shout of “GOOD!” by someone else) and "Needle-nardle-noo". He would also express intense surprise by repeating the word "What?!" rapidly and in rising pitch, as "Whatwhatwhatwhatwhatwhatwhatwhatwhatwhatwhatwhat?" which generally devolves into chicken-like squawking when a high enough pitch is reached, and would do likewise with the word "Yes?" as "Yesyesyesyesyesyes?", generally motivating Grytpype-Thynne to request "Please. Don't do that." Seagoon also occasionally spouts patriotical nonsense, at which Grytpype says, "You silly twisted boy, you" or, on at least one occasion, "You twit."
