= List of The Goon Show cast members and characters =

This is a list of regular cast members of the 1950s British radio programme The Goon Show and the characters they portrayed.

== Spike Milligan ==
=== Throat ===
Throat, Sgt Throat, Miss Throat or Gladys, with a very gravelly voice. Milligan invented this voice by belching, apparently in the middle of rehearsal, much to the producer Peter Eton's annoyance.

=== Little Jim ===
Little Jim, whose single line "He's fallen in the wa-ater" became a national catchphrase. According to a recent TV special about Spike Milligan, the phrase was originated by Peter Sellers' young son. In The Last Goon Show of All, it was revealed that Little Jim was Eccles' nephew, and that apart from "He's fallen in the wa-ater", only Eccles could understand Little Jim's speech, even Little Jim himself having no idea.

=== Spriggs ===
Adolphus (later Jim) Spriggs, aka Jim Pills, who makes frequent appearances on the show. He often repeats his lines in a high-pitched falsetto and calls everybody "Jim", pronounced "Jeeee-eeeeem!". Also known to be a singer (of sorts): in 1957's The Histories Of Pliny the Elder he serenades Julius Grytpype Caesar, whereupon the latter remarks 'Brutus Moriartus, this man is a bit of a crawler. Why does he follow such a profession?' Moriarty replies 'For money, Caesar, he tells me he wants to die rich.' Grytpype: 'And so he shall; give him this sack of gold, and then strangle him.'

Notably, in a few episodes, actors other than Milligan – such as Kenneth Connor in The £50 Cure– would attempt to imitate Spriggs' habit of singing the word 'Jim' at a high pitch, resulting in a fervent contest with Milligan as to who could hold his 'Jim' longest, sometimes interspersed with the character asking 'Are you taking the mick?'

=== Mr Banerjee ===
One of a pair of Indian characters who carry on a lengthy conversation, sometimes about how best to carry out a given task, and using stereotypical Indian syntax.

=== Yakamoto ===
Japanese character who can be found as Eidelberger's sidekick (e.g. Napoleon's Piano and The Canal) or as a Japanese Army officer (e.g. The Fear of Wages).

=== Cor blimey ===
Unnamed character who pops up to say "Cor blimey I'm off!" whenever something dangerous is about to happen. Voice very similar (and possibly related) to Throat.

=== Thingz ===
Havaldar Singhiz Thingz, an Indian idiot, usually found as Bloodnok's servant. The various Indian characters in the show derived from Milligan's childhood in India, where his father had served in the British Army.

=== Hugh Jampton ===
Captain Hugh Jampton, an army officer who made brief appearances primarily as a means of getting an indecent British Army joke past the BBC censors. The name would scan acceptably in the script but could be said suggestively during the broadcast as "huge 'ampton". "Hampton" is cockney rhyming slang: Hampton Wick – dick (penis). The name had originally been slipped into a 1954 issue of the Radio Times, resulting in Milligan being reprimanded by Sir Ian Jacob, Director-General of the BBC and a former Army officer who understood the joke. Milligan immediately resolved to include it in the show. The first appearance was scripted but others were ad libbed by the cast.

=== Fu Manchu ===
Fred Fu Manchu, Chinese Bamboo Saxophonist. Appears as the eponymous villain in The Terrible Revenge of Fred Fu Manchu. Makes minor appearances in a number of other episodes China Story, "The Siege of Fort Night"(e.g. and The Lost Emperor.

== Harry Secombe ==
=== Uncle Oscar ===
Uncle of Henry and Min. A very old pensioner (Henry often asks, "What are you doing out of your grave?") who usually jabbers incoherently but soon collapses. When he is coherent, he can be heard enquiring as to the whereabouts of his teeth, or (as in The Call Of The West), he loses them – Henry remarks, "There go his teeth, Min – more dinner for us!" In The £50 Cure, he is the first to be turned into a chicken after drinking Minnie's laundry soup.

=== Private Bogg ===
One of Major Bloodnok's soldiers who is usually picked upon to do all the dangerous/scary jobs that Bloodnok himself is too afraid to do. However, Bogg does appear as a civilian in The Greatest Mountain In The World; he announces himself as 'Sex: male; name: Bogg F, Superintendent, Ministry of Works and Housing', and declares that Henry Crun's artificial mountain in Hyde Park "will have to come down", quoting Section 9 of some obscure regulation: "No mountain weighing more than 8 pounds 10 ounces and measuring more than 20 feet may be built within a radius of Nelson's Column."

He then lays two lighted sticks of dynamite, which Eccles mistakes for two cigars.

=== Nugent Dirt ===
The first victim of The Phantom Head-Shaver of Brighton. His wife Prunella takes him to court, and after a three-week trial, Judge Schnorrer finally pronounces sentence – "Now, then, Nugent Dirt – the jury of three just men and twenty-nine criminals finds you guilty of hiding your bald nut from your wife until after you had married her.... Therefore – I sentence you to pay a fine of three shillings or do sixty years in the nick". Dirt replies: "I'll do the sixty years – I'm not throwing three bob down the drain."

=== Izzy ===
Based on the Jewish comic Issy Bonn.

=== Welshmen ===
Secombe also played various Welshmen (e.g. a lorry driver in Wings Over Dagenham, and a navvy in The Scarlet Capsule). Members of the newsgroup alt.fan.goons refer to most of these characters as "Secombe Bach." In the beginning of the episode The Thing on the Mountain, all three Goons (with Milligan as Adolphus Spriggs and one line as Singhiz Thingz) imitate Welshmen. In Wings Over Dagenham, Secombe's Welsh character is named "Dai". In The Mighty Wurlitzer, the first part of the story is set in Wales. Secombe (himself a Welshman in the role of Seagoon), Milligan (playing a cat) and Sellers (à la Mai Jones) end virtually every sentence with the Welsh word "bach" (which means 'small' – occasionally, a Welshman will refer to his 'butty bach', roughly translated 'my little friend'). Secombe dryly remarks after Milligan's lines, "That's the first time I've heard a cat bark."

=== Yorkshiremen ===
When there was a need, Secombe would often play the part of a Yorkshireman, usually unnamed. One example of Secombe's Yorkshire accent is in the episode Lurgi Strikes Britain, where he plays a bus conductor in Oldham (although the town is historically in Lancashire, some of the outlying villages of Oldham were situated in the West Riding of Yorkshire at the time), the first victim of the dreaded lurgi. He also uses the accent as a workman in The Last Tram (From Clapham), and as the Manager of the East Acton Labour Exchange in World War I. In The Macreekie Rising he plays a dim Yorkshireman on guard at the Tower of London, using the name "Fred Nurke".

== Peter Sellers ==
=== Cynthia ===
Cynthia, ROE (Rose of England), a breathy nymphomaniac femme fatale from Earl's Court. Neddie's occasional love interest, with a jealous lover called Raoul (played by Ray Ellington with a George Sanders patina). Jilted for an elephant in "Tales of Men's Shirts". In "The Scarlet Capsule", the local residents need to be evacuated, for fear of an unexploded bomb. Seagoon (as Ned Quatermass) knocks on Cynthia's door, and when she answers, he says "I'm terribly sorry to knock you up so late...." (pause for the double-entendre to sink in), to which she replies: "They all say that..."

=== Willium "Mate" Cobblers ===
Willium "Mate" Cobblers, working-class cockney idiot, who played all sorts of roles, including soldiers, policemen and various menial servants. He was often included in stories that called for a generic extra person that did not require too much character development in his own right. His catchphrase, "You can't park 'ere, mate", was a Goon in-joke that took a swipe at officious BBC commissionaires. (Sellers used a similar voice for trade union leader Fred Kite in the film I'm All Right Jack). Based on a hardware store owner known to the Goons. When asked "What kind of wood is this?" he would respond "That's solid wood, that is, mate." In the Goon Show Script books Willium is revealed to be related to Grytpype-Thynne.

=== Mr Lalkaka ===
One of a pair of Indian gentlemen, the other, Mr Banerjee, was played by Milligan; on occasion, however, the roles were reversed, with Sellers playing Banerjee and Milligan Lalkaka. Conversations between these Indian characters occasionally used Hindi obscenities that both Milligan and Sellers had picked up. These were usually the subject of complaints by, surprisingly, elderly ladies.

=== Eidelberger ===
German anti-hero. Sometime Dr. Frankenstein, who invented Eccles, aided and abetted by Yakamoto. Camp Commandant of Stalag 10, 12, and 13, and nominal Kapitan, and Seagoon's accomplice in the plot to steal Napoleon's Piano from the Louvre. His full name when he first appeared was Dr Hans Eidelburger, but he later became Justin Eidelberger, as in "Just an idle bugger". This was another way the Goons would slip words that were then banned from radio into the script.

The voice that Sellers used for this character was similar to that which he later used for Dr. Strangelove.

=== Flowerdew ===
Camp person who makes infrequent appearances. Although one of the earliest established characters, he was absent from the show for a long period and reappeared in the middle of the show's run. Flowerdew is a dab hand with a sewing machine, especially when, as in The Nasty Affair At The Burami Oasis, Seagoon tells him to run up a flag. Also appears in The Histories Of Pliny The Elder; when he tells Seagoon to "Shut up! It was perfectly quiet till you came along!", Seagoon replies, "You're a sailor, and sailors don't care!". And in The String Robberies, Seagoon's train arrives in Scotland with a great blast of steam – Flowerdew is mortified: "There should be a law against trains letting off steam when people are wearing kilts!" Comparable with the characters Julian and Sandy from Round the Horne.

=== Cyril ===
A Jewish character, with an aversion to non-Kosher water. Bloodnok despises Cyril due to his anti-Semitism; when, in King Solomon's Mines, Cyril is indeed drowning in "non-Kosher water", Bloodnok exclaims "Goodness! A crocodile making straight for Cyril!", fires, and then exclaims tersely. "Got him. Now to get the crocodile."

=== Fred Nurke ===
Fred Nurke, who, in The Affair of The Lone Banana, vanishes from right under his mother's nose. Seagoon asks: 'What was he doing there?' Headstone the butler (Sellers) replies 'It was raining at the time, I believe' (another Jewish reference – see Max 'Conks' Geldray).

=== Gladys ===
A strange sexless thing that continually changed its voice and responded often with the phrase 'Yes Darling!'. This part was also played by Ray Ellington (e.g., see "Rommel's Treasure"), and by Wallace Greenslade ("Personal Narrative").

=== Lew/Ernie Cash ===
Another Jewish character, a nasal stereotypical voice; usually a fast-talking theatrical agent or impresario (e.g. The Greenslade Story), who cajoles actors in the wings with two broken legs to break another one. Based on a friend of the Goons. Occasionally appeared as a judge or magistrate. Sometimes called "Schnorrer". He was based on the impresario Lew Grade.

=== Churchill ===
Sir Winston Churchill, who makes regular appearances as the PM. Looks for bits of paper in odd locations, approves crazy projects like atomic dustbins for the Christmas Islands and is suspected of throwing batter puddings at Clement Attlee - although also happy to go to Brighton with Attlee during the terror of the Phantom Head Shaver, as in his words 'Let's go Clem, what have we got to lose?'. He once knocked off Constable Willum Mate's 'hairy police helmet' in order to borrow it for a Christmas party.

=== Hern/Hearn ===
Various American characters with the surname Hern or Hearn, often used for narration, outrageous announcements or parody sales pitches. The Goons referred to Americans as "herns", possibly because saying "hern hern hern...." sounded American to them, possibly because Sellers once said that a decent American accent could be developed simply by saying it in between sentences.

=== And more... ===
It is a measure of Peter Sellers' vocal talents that he was able to speak all Milligan's characters so accurately that Spike's absences from the show were undetected by listeners until the final credits were read. An example of this is the episode The Macreekie Rising, featuring a harrowing exchange between Henry Crun and Minnie Bannister. Sellers had to take both sides of the conversation and clearly had trouble remembering which voice to use.

On the single occasion when Sellers himself was absent, in Who is Pink Oboe?, four other actors and comedians were recruited to fill in for him. He also occasionally used a Laurence Olivier voice, later employed to great comic effect in his 1960s recording of "A Hard Day's Night" as a cod-Shakespearian speech.

== Michael Bentine ==
Bentine was part of the regular cast for the first two seasons. As a tribute of sorts, unheard characters called Bentine are sometimes referred to in later episodes (e.g. The Man Who Never Was)

=== Osric Pureheart ===
This character is portrayed as the archetypal absent-minded, eccentric, and mad professor. Pureheart created the Suez Canal after getting the rights after Cleopatra's death after waiting two thousand years).

=== Hugh Jampton (Bentine's character) ===
See Milligan's character above.

== Other members ==
- Andrew Timothy – the show's original announcer, who left the show after the first few episodes of season 4, claiming that he "feared for his sanity". He did however make a brief pre-recorded appearance in the 1959 episode The Scarlet Capsule ('I would like to say that, whilst I read this stuff, I don't write it – fertannngggg!') and returned in 1972 for The Last Goon Show of All (due to the death of Wallace Greenslade 11 years earlier).
- Wallace Greenslade – announcer, he opened and closed each show (often parodying the traditional BBC announcing style, e.g. "This is the BBC, and it's going bald!"), and occasionally played himself in an episode, most notably "The Greenslade Story", as well as other small parts (e.g., he was "The Phantom Head-Shaver of Brighton"). Greenslade was also noted for what Secombe described as 'playing the part of the French prefect of police, and playing it very badly' in "Tales of Old Dartmoor". In "Insurance, the White Man's Burden", Greenslade opened the show by introducing himself as "Wallace the Pelvis" and singing "See You Later Alligator" in a proper BBC announcer's voice, backed by the Wally Stott Orchestra, prompting Milligan to remark, "Put that pelvis back!"
- Ray Ellington (not related to the Duke) and his Quartet – singer, bassist and drummer. The popular Ellington Quartet acted as rhythm section for the show's orchestra. Ellington, whose father was African-American and mother Jewish, also occasionally played small roles, mostly as African or Arab characters such as Chief Ellinga, spouting much gibberish masquerading as Swahili, Sheik Rattle'n'roll ("The Nasty Affair At the Burami Oasis"), The Wad-of-Char (Shifting Sands), and Bloodnok's arch-enemy The Red Bladder, and various Scottish and Irish characters (but with no attempt to change his normal accent).
- Max Geldray – Dutch jazz harmonica player. Occasionally the butt of Jewish jokes, and more frequently, references to his nose – not for nothing known as 'Conks'. Like Ray Ellington, Geldray sometimes had brief speaking parts in the show, which usually consisted of short lines including, "Oh boy, my conk's still making the headlines!", "I got it bad, and that's not good", and (as a taxi driver picking up Seagoon), "Where to, darling?"
- Wally Stott and his Orchestra – the house band. Stott was a well-known British band leader and arranger whose other credits included numerous recordings for film and singing star Diana Dors. Stott was later known as Angela Morley, having transitioned in 1972. She also composed the music for Hancock's Half Hour.
- George Chisholm – one of the show's regular musicians, sometimes called upon to play Scottish characters (e.g. "The String Robberies", "Wings Over Dagenham", "The Tay Bridge Disaster", "The Macreekie Rising", "The Spon Plague"). He was invited to The Last Goon Show of All but had to decline, responding that "his trombone was stuck in his tartan down in Bournemouth".

== Guest appearances ==
- John Snagge – doyen of BBC newsreaders who, like Greenslade, also played himself in several episodes (usually in pre-recorded inserts), and was a great supporter of the show. Snagge had a prominent part in the 1955 episode The Greenslade Story, when he was present in the studio instead of being pre-recorded, and read his part in his best 'Here-is-the-News' voice.
- Valentine Dyall – radio's "Man in Black", often called upon to play sinister characters. Appeared as the Sheriff of Nottingham in Robin Hood, the Christmas special Goon Show made for the General Overseas Service in 1956. Appeared in 'The Canal'", as an amateur brain surgeon attempting to murder his children (Neddie and Eccles), as well as Lloyds insurance salesman Bluebottle, for the insurance money; appeared as Baron Seagoon in Drums Along the Mersey, with an elaborate scheme to smuggle a million pounds out of England; appeared as Dr. Longdongle in The House of Teeth, a mad medic driven to knocking out men's false teeth and painting them black to fulfil a promise of fifty pairs of castanets to his Spanish flamenco dancer girlfriend Gladys la Tigernutta; appeared as the creepy caretaker of Tintagel in The Spectre of Tintagel; appeared in a rare non-sinister role as Lord Cardigan in The Giant Bombardon, which was set during the Crimean War; deputised as Grytpype-Thynne for an indisposed Peter Sellers in Who Is Pink Oboe?; appeared as himself as a count in The Silver Dubloons. In the beginning of "The Canal", Dyall is announced in his usual manner, as the Man in Black, with a gong-beat – only to read out, "Listeners – a funny thing happened to me on my way to the Theatre tonight...a steamroller ran over my head." After a brief laugh, he mutters "So much for humour."
- Charlotte Mitchell – stepped into the breach on the rare occasions when the script called for an authentic female.
- Cecile Chevreau, another authentic female; made a cameo in African Incident', being found in a compromising position up a tree with Major Bloodnok.
- Jack Train – made two appearances (in Shifting Sands and Who Is Pink Oboe?) reprising his role as Colonel Chinstrap from ITMA. Chinstrap fitted into the Goon Show framework surprisingly well, demonstrating the debt the Goons owed to ITMA.
- Dick Emery – stood in for Secombe as "Emery-type Seagoon" in Spon, and replaced Milligan in a few others, alternating with Graham Stark. Emery also appeared in the closest thing to a Goon Show film, The Case of the Mukkinese Battle Horn (which also featured Sellers and Milligan but not Secombe). He went on to provide voices for the Beatles' Yellow Submarine, and was popular in his own television sketch show in the 1970s.
- Kenneth Connor – stood in for Secombe in The £50 Cure" as well as appearing as Willium Mate in Who is Pink Oboe? in place of Peter Sellers, who was ill (the only time Sellers ever missed a Goon Show recording).
- A. E. Matthews – appeared (unscripted) as himself in 1958's The Evils of Bushey Spon.
- Dennis Price – appeared as Prince John in the Goons Christmas special broadcast of Robin Hood.
- Bernard Miles – appeared as approximately himself, complete with his best bucolic accent, in 1957's The Rent Collectors. On other occasions, e.g. in "The Silver Doubloons", he was himself parodied, probably by Peter Sellers.
- Graham Stark; A good friend of Sellers, Stark made his first known guest appearance with the Goons as Prince Charming in the show's pantomime special, Cinderella. Stark later filled in for Sellers alongside several other actors in Who is Pink Oboe?. At the time of his death in 2013, Stark was the last surviving actor to have appeared in The Goon Show during its original run.
- Lizbeth Webb; The first known rare female presence on The Goon Show, Webb played the title role in the show's pantomime special, Cinderella.
