= Count Jim Moriarty =

Fictional character

Count Jim Moriarty (also called Count Jim Moriarty of the House of Roland) is a character from the 1950s BBC Radio comedy The Goon Show. He was voiced by Spike Milligan. In the episode "The Macreekie Rising of '74", Harry Secombe filled in for the role in Milligan's absence.

Moriarty is an impoverished member of the French aristocracy who has turned to crime to support his lifestyle. Despite having carried out many high-paying cons and robberies during the series, he and his criminal counterpart Hercules Grytpype-Thynne always appear to be permanently destitute. Although his surname is pronounced (/ˌmɔːriˈɑːrti/ MOR-ee-AR-tee), Grytpype-Thynne would occasionally pronounce it /məˈraɪ.ərti/ mə-RY-ər-tee.

Over the years, Moriarty changed from a suave, debonair and efficient French criminal mastermind and confidence trickster into a cringing sidekick of Grytpype-Thynne, who is often disparaging of his manic behaviour, referring to him as "you steaming French nit", "my fast disintegrating friend", or "you crutty French schlapper". Moriarty's deterioration was accompanied by a change in the character's voice, becoming higher in register and losing its smooth diction as the series progressed.

With his thick faux-French accent, he is often found scavenging in dustbins looking for food and uttering nonsensical, half-French curses such as "Sapristi nabolas!", "Sapristi nyuckoes!", or "Sapristi bombpetts!" (incorporating an old-fashioned French expletive that meant originally "by the body of Christ") and "Sacre Fred!" (a Milligan coinage from Sacrebleu) in the episode "Lurgi Strikes Britain".

== Various names ==
Grytpype often introduces him ("and I quote from his death certificate") with a middle name such as "Thighs", "Knees", "Kidney Wiper", etc., along with an appropriate sound effect (e.g. rattling bones, swannee whistle) or Moriarty's catch-phrase "Oooowwwwww", and descriptions of his prowess in various fields:

- "Who has played the male lead in over 50 French postcards"
- "Minister Without Underpants to the Principality of Monte Carlo"
- "Champion barbed-wire hurdler until his tragic accident"
- "Gypsy Saxophonist to the House of Romanoff"
- "Schlapper Royal and noted amateur postman"
- "Husband extraordinary by appointment to the House of Rita Hayworth"

There is also some suggestion that the character is a parody of the Sherlock Holmes villain, Professor Moriarty. In The Hound of the Baskervilles According to Spike Milligan, a preface by Milligan explains that Sherlock "did not stay dead for long", and after chasing him up a mountain did in fact kill Professor Moriarty, but he "later became a character in The Goon Show".
