= The Goon Show =

BBC Radio show broadcast from 1951 to 1960

- Peter Sellers (top), Spike Milligan (left) and Harry Secombe (right) in a 1950s BBC publicity shot
- Other names: Crazy People (series 1)
- Genre: Comedy
- Running time: 30 minutes
- Country of origin: United Kingdom
- Language: English
- Home station: BBC Home Service
- Syndicates: BBC Light Programme; BBC Radio 4 Extra
- Starring: Spike Milligan; Harry Secombe; Peter Sellers; Michael Bentine (1951–1952)
- Announcer: Wallace Greenslade; Andrew Timothy; Denys Drower
- Created by: Spike Milligan
- Produced by: Peter Eton (101 episodes); Dennis Main Wilson (38 episodes); Pat Dixon (29 episodes); Charles Chilton (25 episodes); John Browell (23 episodes); Roy Speer (14 episodes); Leslie Bridgmont (4 episodes); Tom Ronald (3 episodes); Jacques Brown (1 episode)
- Recording studio: Camden Theatre, London
- Original release: 28 May 1951 – 28 January 1960
- No. of series: 10
- No. of episodes: 238 plus 12 specials (list of episodes)
- Audio format: Mono
- Other themes: "Lucky Strike", "Ding-Dong! The Witch Is Dead", "Goons' Gallop", "I Want to Be Happy" or; "Alte Kameraden"
- Ending theme: "Crazy Rhythm" or "Stompin' at the Savoy", performed by Max Geldray and the Ray Ellington Quartet
- Website: www.bbc.co.uk/programmes/b0072vdz

The Goon Show is a British radio comedy programme, originally produced and broadcast by the BBC Home Service from 1951 to 1960, with occasional repeats on the BBC Light Programme. The show ran for ten series, with an additional Vintage Goons series produced at the same time as series 8. Series 1 was titled Crazy People, while all subsequent series were titled The Goon Show. A one-off 1972 reunion episode, The Last Goon Show of All, was broadcast on BBC Radio 4, with a simultaneous television broadcast on BBC Two.

The show's creator and primary writer was Spike Milligan, who performed in the series alongside Harry Secombe, Peter Sellers and (for the first two series) Michael Bentine. The scripts mixed ludicrous plots with surreal humour, puns, catchphrases and an array of bizarre sound effects. There were also light music interludes. Some of the later episodes feature electronic effects devised by the fledgling BBC Radiophonic Workshop, many of which were reused by other shows for decades. Elements of the show satirised contemporary life in 1950s Britain, parodying aspects of show business, commerce, industry, art, politics, diplomacy, the police, geography, the military, education, class structure, literature and film.

The show was released internationally through the BBC Transcription Service (TS). It aired regularly from the 1950s in Australia, South Africa, New Zealand, India, and Canada, although these TS versions were frequently edited to avoid controversial subjects. In the United States, NBC began broadcasting the programme on its radio network from the mid-1950s.

Subversive and absurdist, The Goon Show exercised a considerable influence on the development of British and American comedy and popular culture. It was cited as a major influence by the Beatles, the American comedy troupe the Firesign Theatre, and the British comedy troupe Monty Python.

== Background ==
The series was devised and written by Spike Milligan, with the regular collaboration of other writers including; Larry Stephens (contributing to around 140 episodes), Eric Sykes (who co-wrote most of the episodes in Series 5), Maurice Wiltshire and John Antrobus, initially under the supervision of Jimmy Grafton.

Milligan and Harry Secombe became friends while serving in the Royal Artillery during the Second World War. Famously, Milligan first encountered Lance Bombardier Secombe after Gunner Milligan's artillery unit accidentally allowed a large howitzer to roll off a cliff, under which Secombe was sitting in a small wireless truck: "Suddenly there was a terrible noise as some monstrous object fell from the sky quite close to us. There was considerable confusion, and in the middle of it all the flap of the truck was pushed open and a young, helmeted idiot asked 'Anybody seen a gun?' It was Milligan." Secombe's answer to that question was "What colour was it?" After the war, Secombe met Michael Bentine at the Windmill Theatre, after which they met Peter Sellers at the recording of a BBC radio series titled Third Division. Bentine introduced Sellers to Milligan at the Hackney Empire, where Secombe was performing, and the four became close friends.

The group first formed at The Grafton Arms Pub & Rooms, 2 Strutton Ground, Victoria, London, Jimmy Grafton's London public house in 1948. (Note: There is some confusion in the literature about the actual name of the pub (e.g. Scudamore 1985, McCann 2006). It was "Grafton's" according to The Goon Show Companion, Wilmot/Grafton, not the "Grafton Arms". Lewis Carroll has said there is a difference between what something is named, and what is called, q.v.:) Sellers had already débuted with the BBC. Secombe was often heard on Variety Bandbox. Milligan was writing for and acting in the high-profile BBC show Hip-Hip-Hoo-Roy with Derek Roy. Bentine had just begun appearing in Charlie Chester's peak-time radio show Stand Easy.

The four clicked immediately. "It was always a relief to get away from the theatre and join in the revels at Grafton's on a Sunday night," said Secombe years later. They took to calling themselves "The Goons" and started recording their pub goings-on with a Pickersgill aluminium disk recorder. BBC producer Pat Dixon heard a recording and took interest in the group. He pressed the BBC for a long-term contract for the gang, knowing that it would secure Sellers for more than just seasonal work, something for which the BBC had been aiming. The BBC acquiesced and ordered an initial series, though without much enthusiasm.

The series, under the title Crazy People, had its premiere in May 1951 and audience figures grew rapidly, from around 370,000 to nearly two million by the end of the 17th show. During each episode, musical interludes would be provided by the Ray Ellington Quartet and The Stargazers. No recordings of any episode of this series are known to have survived. The BBC commissioned a second series and a number of changes occurred. The show's title was changed to The Goon Show, musical interludes were shortened, Max Geldray joined the musical lineup, and the Stargazers left partway through the series.

Bentine left the show at the end of series 2, citing a desire to pursue solo projects, although there had been an increasing degree of creative tension between him and Milligan. (Note: There are three or four versions of this story regarding the split. Jimmy Grafton's account is in The Goon Show Companion p. 39; Secombe's account is in Arias and Raspberries p. 208; Milligan's account changed over the years and the bitterness shows in the interview Now That's Funny p. 16; and Bentine's account is in The Story of the Goons p. 30 and also in his autobiography "The Reluctant Jester" (1992), p. 321 of the paperback edition.) As well as the departure of Bentine, series 3 brought a change of producer, with Peter Eton, from the BBC's drama department, replacing Dennis Main Wilson. Eton brought stricter discipline to the show's production. He was also an expert at sound effects and microphone technique, ensuring that the show became a far more dynamic listening experience. A few episodes into the series Milligan suffered a major nervous breakdown. He was hospitalised in early December 1952, just before the broadcast of episode five, but it, and the following episode, had already been written, and the next 12 episodes were co-written by Stephens and Grafton. Milligan was absent as a performer for about two months, returning for episode 17, broadcast in early March 1953.

Milligan blamed his breakdown and the collapse of his first marriage on the sheer volume of writing the show required. His then ground-breaking use of sound effects also contributed to the pressure. (Note: Lewis 1995, p. 217 "owing to the complexities of the technical side, the BBC were wanting the scripts delivered earlier and earlier—so that the boffins in the electronics department etc. could experiment with the new noises") All this exacerbated his mental instability that included bipolar disorder, especially during the third series. The BBC however made sure he was surrounded by accomplished radio comedy writers—Sykes, Stephens, Antrobus, Wiltshire, and Grafton—so many of the problems caused by his ill-health were skilfully covered over by composite scripts.

Many senior BBC staff were variously bemused and befuddled by the show's surreal humour and it has been reported that senior programme executives erroneously referred to it as The Go On Show (Note: Wilmut & Grafton 1976, p. 37 ...one puzzled planner was heard to ask, 'What is this "Go On Show" people are talking about?') or even The Coon Show. The show's title was inspired, according to Spike Milligan, by Alice the Goon, a character from the Popeye comic.

Several of the Goons' nonsense songs were recorded in the late 1950s such as the "Ying Tong Song", number 3 in the UK Singles Chart in 1956. The radio show had high audience ratings in Britain at its peak; tickets for the recording sessions at the BBC's Camden Theatre (now known as KOKO) in London were constantly over-subscribed and the various character voices and catchphrases from the show quickly became part of the vernacular. The series has remained consistently popular ever since, with the show being broadcast weekly by Australia's ABC network as late as 2012. The show is also regularly broadcast on BBC Radio 4 Extra.

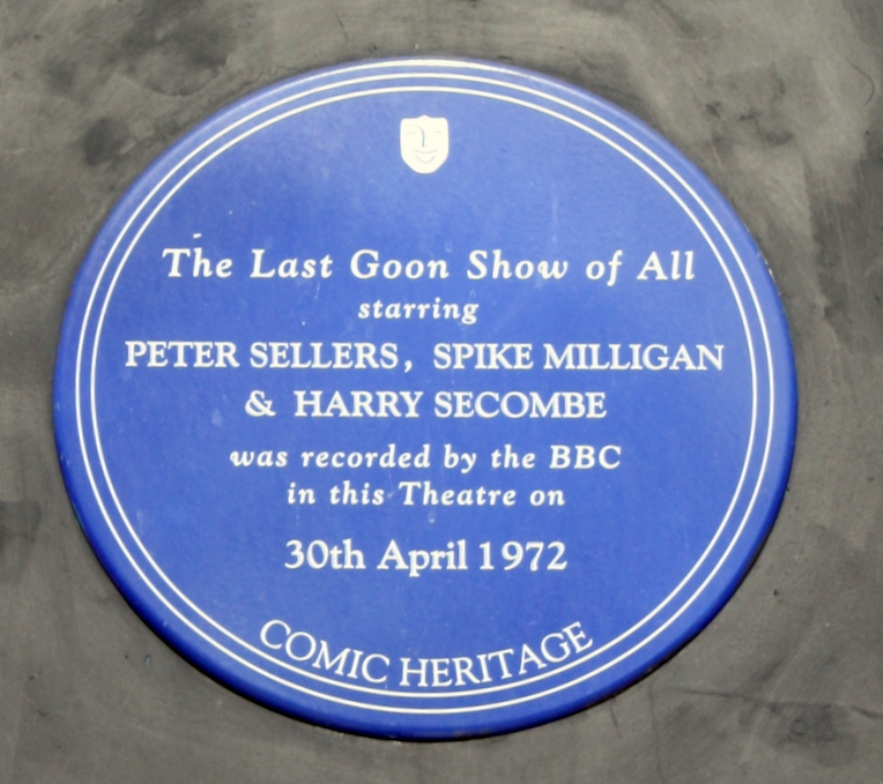
The blue plaque from the old Camden Theatre, now Koko, the site of the recording of The Last Goon Show of All in 1972

The scripts exist mostly in fan-transcribed versions via dedicated websites. Although three books were published containing selected scripts, they are out of print, and typically available only in libraries or second-hand. Some more recent biographical books contain selected scripts.

There were 10 series in total, plus an additional series called Vintage Goons, recorded at the same time as the eighth series, which comprised re-recordings of early shows which had not been recorded by transcription services. The first series (1951) had 17 episodes plus one special, Cinderella; the second series (1952) had 25 episodes; the third series (1952–53) had 25 episodes plus one special, The Coronation Special; the fourth series (1953–54) had 30 episodes plus one special, Archie In Goonland; the fifth series (1954–55) had 26 episodes plus one special, The Starlings; the sixth series (1955–56) had 27 episodes plus three specials; the seventh series (1956–57) had 25 episodes plus two specials; the eighth series (1957–58) had 26 episodes; the Vintage Goons series (1957–58) comprised re-performances of 14 episodes from series four; the ninth series (1958–59) had 17 episodes; and the tenth series (1959–60) had six episodes. A one-off reunion special, The Last Goon Show of All, was recorded and broadcast in 1972.

== Format ==
Throughout its history, each episode of The Goon Show, which usually ran just under 30 minutes, was essentially structured as a comedy-variety programme, consisting of scripted comedy segments alternating with musical interludes.

The first two series were mostly produced by Dennis Main Wilson; none of the episodes was given an individual title and these early shows were loosely structured and consisted of four or five unconnected sketches, separated by musical items. According to later producer Peter Eton, the musical segments took up around half the programme.^{:113} In this formative phase the show co-starred Milligan (who played only minor roles in the early shows), Sellers, Secombe and Bentine, with the latter playing the nominal 'hero' of each episode, madcap inventor Dr Osric Pureheart.^{:124} Musical performances were by virtuoso jazz harmonica player Max Geldray, singer Ray Ellington and his quartet (both of whom were recruited by Dixon) and vocal group the Stargazers, but the latter left after Episode 6 of Series 2, and for the remaining episodes Secombe filled in, singing a straight vocal number.^{:124} Incidental, theme and backing music was provided by Stanley Black and the BBC Dance Orchestra.^{:127} Series 2 saw the show officially change its title from Crazy People to The Goon Show as well as featuring the first appearance of popular characters Minnie Bannister (Milligan) and Henry Crun (Sellers). Bentine left the show after the second series.

From Series 3, The Goon Show gradually settled into its 'classic' format. Milligan, Stephens and Grafton began to work within a narrative structure and by the second half of Series 4 each episode typically consisted of three acts linked by a continuing plot,^{:143} with Geldray performing between Acts I and II and Ellington between Acts II and III. Almost all of the principal and occasional characters were now performed by Milligan and Sellers, with Secombe usually playing only Neddie Seagoon, who had replaced Pureheart as the hero of most of the stories. The closing theme, backing for Geldray and incidental music was now provided by a big band of freelance musicians under the direction of Angela Morley (known at the time as Wally Stott), who had been writing for the show since the first series.^{:127} After the end of Series 3, original announcer Andrew Timothy was replaced (at the suggestion of John Snagge) by Wallace Greenslade,^{:127} who provided spoken narrative links as well as occasionally performing small roles in the scripts.

From Series 3 onwards, the principal character roles were:

- Neddie Seagoon (Secombe)
- Eccles (Milligan)
- Bluebottle (Sellers)
- Henry Crun (Sellers)
- Minnie Bannister (Milligan)
- Hercules Grytpype-Thynne (Sellers)
- Count Jim Moriarty (Milligan)
- Major Dennis Bloodnok (Sellers)

Secondary characters were the "Indians", Banerjee and Lalkaka, the servant Abdul/Singez Thingz, Willium "Mate" Cobblers, Cyril, Jim Spriggs, Little Jim, Flowerdew and Chief Ellinga/The Red Bladder – both played by Ray Ellington. There were also occasional guest stars including senior BBC announcer John Snagge, and actors Valentine Dyall, Dick Emery, Kenneth Connor, Dennis Price and Bernard Miles. The traditional plots involved Grytpype-Thynne and Moriarty getting Neddie Seagoon involved in some far-fetched plan, and meeting the other cast members along the way.

Many characters had regular catchphrases which quickly moved into the vernacular; among the best known are:

- "He's fallen in the water!" (Little Jim)
- "You dirty, rotten swine, you! You have deaded me!" (Bluebottle)
- "You can't get the wood, you know." (Henry, Minnie)
- "You silly, twisted boy, you." (Grytpype-Thynne)
- "You can't park 'ere, mate" (Willium) – Milligan's dig at officious BBC commissionaires.
- "Ying Tong Iddle I Po" (various) – which became the basis for a novelty hit as "Ying Tong Song"

=== Surrealism ===
"What time is it Eccles?"
3:22 sample - 973kb

The Goon Show has been variously described as "avant-garde", "surrealist", "abstract", and "four dimensional". The show played games with the medium of radio itself. Whole scenes were written in which characters would leave, close the door behind themselves, yet still be inside the room. Further to this, characters would announce their departure, slam a door, but it would be another character who had left the room. That character would then beat on the door for re-admittance, the door would open and close and again the wrong character would be locked out.

The show paved the way for surreal and alternative humour, as acknowledged by comedians such as Eddie Izzard.^{:vii} The surreality was part of the attraction for Sellers,, but it exacerbated Milligan's mental instability especially during the third series. Many of the sequences have been cited as being visionary in the way that they challenged the traditional conventions of comedy. In the Pythons' autobiography, Terry Jones states "The Goons of course were my favourite. It was the surreality of the imagery and the speed of the comedy that I loved - the way they broke up the conventions of radio and played with the very nature of the medium." This is reiterated by Michael Palin and John Cleese. Cleese recalls listening to The Goon Show as a teenager in the mid-1950s "and being absolutely amazed by its surreal humour. It came at a key stage in my own development and I never missed a show".

=== Music and sound effects ===
The Fred the Oyster sound effect
The sound of an oyster opening which represented the introduction of Fred the Oyster.
From "The Sinking of Westminster Pier"
(15 February 1955, s05e23)

Orchestral introductions, links and accompaniment were provided by a hand-picked big band made up of London-based session musicians. The arrangements and musical direction were done by Angela Morley from the third to the 10th series. Morley produced many arrangements and link passages, further improved by the first-class sound quality the BBC engineers managed to achieve. Members of the band featured prominently in the comedy proceedings, particularly jazz trombonist George Chisholm who frequently played Scots characters. The show's concluding music was usually either "Ding-Dong! The Witch Is Dead" or a truncated and ironic rendition of the Alte Kameraden (Old Comrades') march, followed by Max Geldray and the Ray Ellington Quartet playing "Crazy Rhythm" as play-out music. Other theme tunes used included "Goons' Gallop", a play on Devil's Galop, "I Want to Be Happy" and "Lucky Strike", which the cast sang over at the conclusion of the episode called "The Great Bank Robbery".

In keeping with the variety requirements of the BBC's "light entertainment" format, The Goon Show scripts were structured in three acts, separated by two musical interludes. These were provided by the Ray Ellington Quartet – who performed a mixture of jazz, rhythm & blues and calypso songs – and by harmonica virtuoso Max Geldray who performed mostly middle of the road numbers and jazz standards of the 1930s and 1940s accompanied by the big band. Both Ellington and Geldray also made occasional cameo appearances; Ellington was often drafted in to play stereotypical "black" roles such as a tribal chieftain, native bearer or Major Bloodnok's nemesis (and counterpoint to Bloodnok's affliction) "The Red Bladder".

It was in its use of pre-recorded and live sound effects that The Goon Show broke the most new ground. Part of the problem was that "not even Milligan knew how to capture electronically the peculiar sounds that came alive in his head – he just knew when it had not yet happened". An example of this comes from an often cited story of Milligan filling his two socks with custard in the Camden Theatre canteen, in an attempt to achieve a squelching effect. Milligan asked the BBC canteen ladies to make some custard; they thought he must have some stomach trouble so lovingly made him a fresh custard – which he accepted with thanks and immediately poured into his sock, much to their horror. Secombe recalled "Back in the studio, Spike had already placed a sheet of three-ply near a microphone." One after the other, he swung them around his head against the wood, but failed to produce the sound effect he was seeking ("So, a sock full of custard and no sound effect!"). (Note: Ventham 2002, p. 19 The socks-filled-with-custard story has been frequently cited since at least the 1970s, when it was reiterated in newspaper articles.) Secombe noted that "Spike used to drive the studio managers mad with his insistence on getting the sound effects he wanted. In the beginning, when the programme was recorded on disc, it was extremely difficult to achieve the right sound effect. There were, I think, four turntables on the go simultaneously, with different sounds being played on each – chickens clucking, Big Ben striking, donkeys braying, massive explosions, ships' sirens – all happening at once. It was only when tape came into use that Spike felt really happy with the effects." An FX instruction in one script read "Sound effect of two lions walking away, bumping against each other. If you can't get two lions, two hippos will do". Over time, the sound engineers became increasingly adept at translating the script into desired sounds, assisted from the late 1950s onwards by specialists in the BBC's newly formed Radiophonic Workshop.

Milligan's relationship with BBC managers preparing for the recording of episodes was often acrimonious and resulted in rows, and Milligan later agreed that he was a diva during this time, adding "I was trying to shake the BBC out of its apathy. Sound effects were a knock on the door and tramps on gravel – that was it, and I tried to transform it."

Many of the sound effects created for later programmes featured innovative production techniques borrowed from the realm of musique concrète, and using the then new technology of magnetic tape. Many of these sequences involved the use of complex multiple edits, echo and reverberation and the deliberate slowing down, speeding up or reversing of tapes. One of the most famous was the legendary "Bloodnok's Stomach" sound effect, created by the BBC Radiophonic Workshop to represent the sound of Major Bloodnok's digestive system in action, which included a variety of inexplicable gurgling and explosive noises. Lewis (1995, p. 218) states Bloodnok's stomach "was achieved by overlaying burps, whoops from oscillators, water splashes, cork-like pops, and light artillery blasts".

== Cast members and characters ==
- Spike Milligan

- Major characters: Eccles
- Minnie Bannister
- Count Jim Moriarty
- Minor characters: Throat
- Little Jim
- Spriggs
- Yakamoto
- Cor blimey
- Singes Thingz
- Hugh Jampton
- Fu Manchu
- Mr Banerjee

- Harry Secombe

- Major character: Neddie Seagoon
- Minor characters: Uncle Oscar
- Private Bogg
- Nugent Dirt
- Izzy
- Welshmen
- Yorkshiremen

- Peter Sellers

- Major characters : Major Dennis Bloodnok
- Bluebottle
- Henry Crun
- Hercules Grytpype-Thynne
- Minor characters: Cynthia
- Willium "Mate" Cobblers
- Mr Lalkaka
- Eidelberger
- Flowerdew
- Cyril
- Fred Nurke
- Gladys
- Lew/Ernie Cash
- Churchill
- Hearn
- and more...

- Michael Bentine

- Major character: Prof. Osric Pureheart
- Minor characters: more...

- Other cast members
- Guest cast members

== Running jokes ==
=== Lurgi ===
Several of the words and phrases invented for the show soon entered common usage, the most famous being the word lurgi. In the episode "Lurgi Strikes Britain", Spike Milligan introduced the fictional malady of Lurgi (sometimes spelled Lurgy), which has survived into modern usage to mean the common cold, or any miscellaneous or non-specific illness (often preceded by the adjective "dreaded"). The symptoms of Lurgi included the uncontrollable urge to cry "Eeeeyack-a-boo", though even during the episode the ailment proved to be an extortionate attempt to sell brass band musical instruments. Milligan was later to make up his own definition in Treasure Island According to Spike Milligan, where Jim Hawkins' mother describes it as "like brown spots of shit on the liver".

=== Brandyyy! ===
Alcohol was strictly forbidden during rehearsals and recording, so the cast fortified themselves with milk. The milk in turn was fortified with brandy. In later episodes the catchphrase "round the back for the old brandy!" or "the old Marlon Brando" was used to announce the exit of one or more characters, or a break for music. In "The Pam's Paper Insurance Policy" (Series 9, Episode 4), Ray Ellington, before his musical item begins, muses, "I wonder where he keeps that stuff!". In "The Scarlet Capsule" (Series 9, Episode 14), Ellington's reply to Secombe's cry of "Time for Ray Ellington and the old BRANDYYY there" was "The introductions he gives me...". In "The Moon Show" (Series 7, Episode 18), Ellington sympathises with the listeners, stating "Man, the excuses he makes to get to that brandy!", causing Milligan, Sellers and Secombe to wail "MATE!" in protest. However, Milligan got his own back by making Ellington laugh halfway through the song by doing Minnie Bannister voices while Ellington was singing.

=== Rhubarb, rhubarb, rhubarb! ===
During radio programmes of the 1920s and 1930s, the background noise for crowd scenes was often achieved by a moderately large group of people mumbling "rhubarb" under their breath with random inflections. This was often parodied by Milligan, who would try to get the same effect with only three or four people, clearly intoning the word rather than mumbling. After some time, Secombe began throwing in "custard" during these scenes (for example, in "The Fear of Wages and Wings Over Dagenham", where the phrase was amended to 'flying rhubarb').

=== Raspberry blowing ===
As well as being used as a comic device randomly inserted into different sketches to avoid silence, the blowing of raspberries entered the Goons as Harry Secombe's signal to the other actors that he was going to crack up; you would hear a joke from him, a raspberry, and a stream of laughter. In the Goons' musical recording "The Ying-Tong Song", Milligan performed a solo for raspberry-blower, as one might for tuba or baritone saxophone. Milligan made much use of a rather surreal Columbia Records 78 rpm sound effects disc, catalogue number YB20, which bears the innocuous title "Donkey" on the label. Approximating possibly the most obscene and flatulent noise ever recorded, it appeared first in the show "The Sinking of Westminster Pier" as a sound to accompany an oyster called Fred opening its shell; it thereafter became known as Fred the Oyster, and appears as such in the scripts. This recording was often used as a reaction to a bad joke. Examples include The Last Goon Show of All during which Neddie shouts old jokes into a fuel tank in order to "start the show".

Years later, Milligan collaborated with Ronnie Barker on The Phantom Raspberry Blower of Old London Town in which the credits read, "Raspberries professionally blown by Spike Milligan". David Jason has also claimed to have produced the sound effect and indeed was credited with this in the second segment of Ronnie Barker's LWT series Six Dates with Barker (1971).

=== "Trapped in a piano" ===
In several shows, one character, typically either Henry Crun or Minnie Bannister, would be found trapped in a piano. In The Mystery of the Fake Neddie Seagoon, Crun was inside a piano and his speech was accompanied by suitable piano noises. In The Jet-Propelled Guided NAAFI, Moriarty is hiding in a piano disguised as one of the strings. He thinks he's a G-string. Grytpype-Thynne plays a "do-re-mi" scale to find him – Moriarty is "me". When Moriarty escapes, he is two feet taller than he used to be—someone sent in a piano tuner.

The "in a piano" joke was re-used one last time in The Last Goon Show of All.

=== Other references ===
Sometimes characters were introduced as "scion of the house of Rowton", or "member of Rowton House". This was a reference to the Rowton Houses, which were hostels for itinerant working men in London.

== Films ==
The following films were a product of Goon activity:

- Let's Go Crazy (1951) (Starring and written by Milligan and Sellers)
- Penny Points to Paradise (1951) (Starring Milligan, Secombe and Sellers)
- Down Among the Z Men (1952) (Starring Bentine, Milligan, Secombe and Sellers)
- The Case of the Mukkinese Battle Horn (1956) (A two-reeler written by Milligan, Sellers, Larry Stephens and others, starring Milligan, Sellers and Dick Emery)
- The Running Jumping & Standing Still Film (1959) (A surreal one-reeler short subject written by Milligan, Sellers and Richard Lester, starring Milligan and Sellers and directed by Lester)

== Later revivals ==
=== Books ===
Spike Milligan teamed up with illustrator Pete Clarke to produce two books of comic strip Goons. The stories were slightly modified versions of classic Goon shows.

- The Goon Cartoons (1982)

"The Last Goon Show of All", "The Affair of the Lone Banana", "The Scarlet Capsule", "The Pevensey Bay Disaster"

- More Goon Cartoons (1983)

"The Case of the Vanishing Room", "The Case of the Missing C.D. Plates", "The Saga of the Internal Mountain", "Rommel's Treasure"

- The Goon Show Scripts (1972) by Milligan

"Foreword by Sellers", Details of the Show, Cast, Characters, etc., and "The Dreaded Batter Pudding Hurler", "The Phantom Head Shaver", "The Affair of the Lone Banana", "The Canal", "Napoleon's Piano", "Foiled by President Fred", "The Mighty Wurlitzer", "The Hastings Flyer", "The House of Teeth".

- More Goon Show Scripts (1973) by Milligan

"The Battle of Spion Kop", "Ned's Atomic Dustbin", "The spy; or, Who Is Pink Oboe?", "Call of the West", "The Scarlet Capsule", "The Tay Bridge Disaster", "The Gold-plate Robbery", "The £50 cure".

- The Lost Goon Shows (1987) by Milligan (with Larry Stephens)

"Operation Christ Duff", "The Internal Mountain", "The Silent Bugler", "The Dreaded Piano Clubber", "The Siege of Fort Night", "The Tree Maniac".

=== Films ===
- The Life and Death of Peter Sellers (2004)

A re-creation of a Goon Show recording before a studio audience is seen early in the HBO Original Movie The Life and Death of Peter Sellers (2004), with Geoffrey Rush as Sellers, Edward Tudor-Pole as Spike Milligan, Steve Pemberton as Harry Secombe and Lance Ellington as Ray Ellington. A brief moment from that re-creation is seen in the trailer for that film.

=== Stage ===
- Ying Tong: A Walk with the Goons

Ying Tong is a play written by Roy Smiles which is set partly in a radio studio, partly in a mental asylum and partly in Spike Milligan's mind. It recreates the Goons recording the show, but part way through Spike has a mental breakdown and is committed to an asylum. While it features all of the Goons throughout (although Bentine is mentioned, the fourth character represents Wallace Greenslade), the focus is on Milligan and his breakdown.

- Birmingham Comedy Festival

Birmingham Comedy Festival produced a theatre production as part of their festival in 2014 staging two Milligan Goon Show scripts, The Canal and The Phantom Head Shaver (of Brighton). The festival produced a second touring production in 2017 featuring two more Milligan scripts, The House Of Teeth and The Jet Propelled Guided NAAFI. Both runs were sanctioned by Norma Farnes and Spike Milligan Productions. The festival returned to The Goon Show in 2023 to mark the centenary of the birth of Larry Stephens, staging The Seagoon Memoirs and The Moriarty Murder Mystery. Cast: Sellers - Richard Usher; Milligan - Robert Coletta (2014), Mark Earby (2017, 2023), Secombe - Jimm Rennie (2014, 2023), Stephan Bessant (2017); Wallace Greenslade/ Valentine Dyal - Phil Hemming (2014, 2017), Ian Danter (2024). Director by Robert F. Ball (2014, 2017); Director/Producer Dave Freak. The company were commissioned in 2026 by the Goon Show Preservation Society to air further episodes to mark The Goon Show's 75th anniversary.

- Apollo Theatre Company

Touring in late 2018 in the UK, Apollo Theatre Company in conjunction with Spike Milligan Productions recreated three episodes of The Goon Show - The Dreaded Batter Pudding Hurler, Tails of Men's Shirts, and The Phantom Head Shaver - with recreations of the original scripts. Co-producer Norma Farnes, Milligan's ex-manager, agreed to the use of the material on the basis the production was respectful of the scripts. The roles of Sellers, Milligan, and Secombe were played by Julian McDowell, Colin Elmer and Clive Greenwood and the production was directed by McDowell and Tim Astley.

=== Radio and television ===
- The Idiot Weekly, Price 2d (TV, 1956) and The Idiot Weekly (radio, 1958–1962)

The Idiot Weekly, Price 2d, which starred Peter Sellers, was the first attempt to translate Goon Show humour to television. Made for Associated-Rediffusion during 1956 and only broadcast in the London area, it was mainly written by Milligan, with contributions from other writers in the Associated London Scripts cooperative including Dave Freeman and Terry Nation, with Eric Sykes as script editor. The Idiot Weekly (1958–1962) was an Australian radio comedy series written by and starring Milligan with an Australian supporting cast including Ray Barrett and John Bluthal. It was made for the ABC during Milligan's numerous visits to Australia, where his family had emigrated. Milligan adapted some Goon Show scripts and included his Goon Show characters (notably Eccles) in many episodes. Six episodes of The Idiot Weekly were remade by the BBC as The Omar Khayyam Show in 1963.

- The Telegoons (1963–1964)

The Telegoons (1963–1964) was a 15-minute BBC puppet show featuring the voices of Milligan, Secombe and Sellers and adapted from the radio scripts. 26 episodes were made. The series was briefly repeated immediately after its original run, and all episodes are known to survive, having been unofficially released online.

- The Goon Show – The Whistling Spy Enigma (Secombe & Friends) (1966)

Recorded for Harry Secombe's six-part comedy series, of which only a portion was actually used for the original broadcast, this was similar to "Tales of Men's Shirts" as a re-enactment of a radio play for television. Whilst initially it was thought that only the portion used in the TV show survived, a full copy of the performance was found by the British Film Institute.

- The Goon Show – Tales of Men's Shirts (1968)

Essentially a re-enactment of a radio performance, the three Goons were joined by John Cleese as announcer for a special shown on Thames Television. An almost-complete copy of this broadcast is held by the British Film Institute.

- The Last Goon Show of All (1972)

In 1972, the Goons reunited to perform The Last Goon Show of All.

- Goon Again (2001)

In 2001, the BBC recorded a "new" Goon Show, Goon Again, featuring Andy Secombe (son of Harry), Jon Glover and Jeffrey Holland, with Christopher Timothy (son of Andrew Timothy) announcing and Lance Ellington (son of Ray Ellington) singing, based on two lost series 3 episodes from 1953, "The Story of Civilisation" and "The Plymouth Hoe Armada", both written by Milligan and Stephens.

=== Records ===
The Goons made a number of records, including "I'm Walking Backwards for Christmas" (originally sung by Milligan in the show to fill in during a musicians' strike), and "Bloodnok's Rock and Roll Call", the B-side of which, the "Ying Tong Song", soon became more popular and was reissued as an A-side in the mid-1970s, becoming a surprise novelty hit. The last time all three Goons worked together was in 1978 when they recorded two new songs, "The Raspberry Song" and "Rhymes".

- Bridge on the River Wye (Parlophone, 1962)

A 1962 comedy LP with Milligan and Sellers as well as Peter Cook and Jonathan Miller. A spoof of the film The Bridge on the River Kwai, it was originally recorded under that name. However, the film company threatened legal action if the name was used. Thus some clever editing of the recording by future Beatles producer George Martin removed the K every time the word Kwai was uttered, creating Bridge on the River Wye. The LP is based on The Goon Show's African Incident (30 December 1957),^{:183} which featured Sellers' vocal impersonation of Alec Guinness. Lewis' (1995, pp. 205–206) gives a good account of this background.

- How to Win an Election (Philips, 1964)

In 1964, Milligan, Secombe and Sellers lent their voices to a comedy LP, How to Win an Election (or Not Lose by Much), which was written by Leslie Bricusse. It was not exactly a Goons reunion, because Sellers was in Hollywood and had to record his lines separately. The album was reissued on CD in 1997.

==== Singles ====
Title	Year	Peak chart positions	
Title	Year	UK	AUS
"I'm Walking Backwards for Christmas" b/w "The Bluebottle Blues"	1956	4	—
"Bloodnok's Rock 'n' Roll Call" b/w "The Ying Tong Song"	1956	3	—
"Eeh! Ah! Oh! Ooh!" b/w "I Love You"	1957	—	—
"Whistle Your Cares Away" b/w "A Russian Love Song"	1957	—	—
"Ying Tong Song" (re-release) b/w "I'm Walking Backwards for Christmas"	1973	9	57
"Bloodnok's Rock 'n' Roll Call" (re-release) b/w "I Love You"	1975	—	—
"The Raspberry Song" b/w "Rhymes"	1978	—	—
"—" denotes releases that did not chart or were not released in that territory.

== Impact on comedy and culture ==
In George Perry's book The Life of Python (1999) he comments: "In the Britain of 1950, humour was derived from three main sources: print, film and radio, and despite the advent of television, throughout the 1950s radio remained the dominant source of broadcast comedy. In this period, two radio comedy shows exercised a profound influence. The first was Take It from Here, with its polished professionalism. The other was The Goon Show, with its absurdity, manic surreality and unpredictability."

On the influence of The Goons, Eric Sykes wrote that in the post-World War II years, "other shows came along but 'The House of Comedy' needed electricity. Then, out of the blue ... The Goons ...Spike Milligan simply blew the roof off, and lit the whole place with sunshine. At a cursory glance, The Goon Show was merely quick-fire delivery of extremely funny lines mouthed by eccentric characters, but this was only the froth. In The Goon Show, Spike was unknowingly portraying every facet of the British psyche".

Sykes and Milligan, along with Ray Galton, Alan Simpson, Frankie Howerd and Stanley ("Scruffy") Dale, co-founded the writers' cooperative Associated London Scripts (ALS), which over time included others such as Larry Stephens. In his book Spike & Co, Graham McCann says "the anarchic spirit of the Goon Show...would inspire, directly or indirectly and to varying extents, Monty Python's Flying Circus, The Hitchhiker's Guide to the Galaxy, The Young Ones, Vic Reeves Big Night Out, The League of Gentlemen, Brass Eye and countless other strange and bold new comedies". Other ALS-related comedies such as Sykes and A..., Hancock's Half Hour, Steptoe and Son, Beyond Our Ken, and Round The Horne influenced their own genres of comedy.^{:344–345}

Eddie Izzard notes that the Goons and Milligan in particular "influenced a new generation of comedians who came to be known as 'alternative'."^{:vii} John Cleese notes that "In comedy, there are a very small number of defining moments when somebody comes along and genuinely creates a breakthrough, takes us into territory where nobody has been before. The only experiences to which I can compare my own discovery of the Goons are going to see N. F. Simpson's play One Way Pendulum ... or, later on, hearing Peter Cook for the first time. They were just light years ahead of everyone else."^{:151}

=== The Beatles ===
The Goons made a considerable impact on the humour of the Beatles, especially John Lennon. On 30 September 1973, Lennon reviewed the book The Goon Show Scripts for The New York Times. He wrote: "I was 12 when The Goon Show first hit me, 16 when they finished with me. Their humour was the only proof that the world was insane. One of my earlier efforts at writing was a 'newspaper' called The Daily Howl. I would write it at night, then take it into school and read it aloud to my friends. Looking at it now, it seems strangely similar to The Goon Show." Lennon also noted that George Martin, the Beatles' long-time producer, had previously made records with both Spike Milligan and Peter Sellers.

In a discussion of an accidentally Goonish nature, about introducing the next song during the 1963 BBC production of Pop Go The Beatles, Lennon is also recorded as quipping "Love these Goon shows".

=== Royal family ===
The Goons were popular among the British royal family, particularly with Prince Charles (later King Charles III), who would often mimic the voices of the characters. Prince Philip and Princess Anne attended the recording of The Last Goon Show of All in 1972; Charles was unable to do so due to naval duties but sent a telegram to the cast. Charles wrote an introduction to the book More Goon Show Scripts, and became patron of the Goon Show Preservation Society in 1998.

=== Firesign Theatre ===
The NBC radio network broadcast the programme in the United States in the mid-1950s. In 1965, Peter Bergman met and befriended Milligan during the time he worked in the UK on the BBC television programme Not So Much a Programme, More a Way of Life. He also saw the Beatles in concert, which gave him the inspiration to form a four-man comedy group. When he returned to the US the next year to host the radio show Radio Free Oz on KPFK-FM in Los Angeles, he teamed with Philip Proctor, Phil Austin, and David Ossman to form the Firesign Theatre. Proctor, Austin, and Ossman were big fans of the Monitor broadcasts of the Goon Show. According to Ossman:

We all listened to The Goon Show, Peter Sellers, Spike Milligan and Harry Secombe, at various times in our lives. We heard a lot of those shows. They impressed us when we started doing radio ourselves, because they sustained characters in a really surreal and weird kind of situation for a long period of time. They were doing that show for 10 years, all the way through the 1950s. So we were just listening to them at the end. It was that madness and the ability to go anywhere and do anything and yet sustain those funny characters. So when we first did written radio, where we would sit down and write half hour skits and do them once a week, which we did in the fall of 1967, we did things that were imitative of The Goon Show and learned a lot of voices from them and such.

=== Monty Python ===
Among the influences on Monty Python, the members of the comedy team are described as being "indebted to BBC radio comedy, and particularly to the Goon Show." The future members of Monty Python were fans, and on many occasions they expressed their collective debt to Milligan and The Goons. Scudamore cites an interview for example, in which John Cleese stated "the Goon Show influenced us enormously".^{:170} He reiterates this point in his contribution to Ventham's book: "We all loved The Goon Show in the Monty Python Team: it ignited some energy in us. It was more a spirit that was passed on, rather than any particular technique. The point is that once somebody has crossed a barrier and done something that has never been done before, it is terribly easy for everybody else to cross it".^{:151}

Similarly, in the introduction to Graham Chapman's posthumous anthology (2006, p. xvii) Yoakum notes that while other radio comedies influenced Chapman, "the show that truly astounded Graham, and was a major influence on his comedy was The Goon Show." And on page 23 Chapman states: "from about the age of seven or eight I used to be an avid listener to a radio programme called The Goon Show. In fact, at that stage I wanted to be a Goon".

In their sketch "Election Night Special", the Pythons gave an appreciative nod to their forebears. When one of the onscreen elections reporters asks his companion, "What do you make of the nylon dog cardigan and plastic mule rest?" a voice offstage yells, "There's no such thing!" to which the reporter replies, "Thank you, Spike."

== Deaths ==
Peter Sellers died on 24 July 1980, aged 54. Michael Bentine died on 26 November 1996, aged 74. Harry Secombe died on 11 April 2001, aged 79. Milligan claimed to be relieved that Secombe had died before him, because if so then Secombe would have been in a position to sing at his funeral. Terence "Spike" Milligan died on 27 February 2002, aged 83; Secombe ended up singing at his funeral anyway, as a recording. Two years later, Milligan's wish to have the words "I told you I was ill" inscribed on his gravestone was finally granted, although the church would only agree if the words were written in Irish, as Dúirt mé leat go raibh mé breoite.

== See also ==
- Goon Show Preservation Society
- List of The Goon Show episodes
- Literary nonsense
- The Milligan Papers – A BBC Radio comedy from 1987, often called "A Goon Show for the '80s".

== Bibliography ==
- Barnes, Peter (August 2002). "'An Uncooked Army Boot': Spike Milligan 1918-2002". New Theatre Quarterly. 18 (Part 3. Intq 71): 205–210. doi:10.1017/s0266464x02000295.
- Farnes, Norma, ed. (6 November 1997). The Goons: The Story. London: Virgin Publishing. ISBN 1-85227-679-7. – includes chapters from Milligan, Secombe & Sykes.
- Wilmut, Roger; Grafton, Jimmy (1976). The Goon Show Companion - A History and Goonography. London: Robson Books. ISBN 0-903895-64-1.
- Rose, Elizabeth, ed. (2000). The Book of the Goons. London: Robson Books. ISBN 0-86051-286-X. (First published by Robson Books, 1974).
- McCann, Graham (2006). Spike & Co. London: Hodder and Stoughton Ltd. ISBN 978-0-340-89808-6. – A resource, comprising a comprehensive biography of the script co-operative 'Associated London Scripts' set up by Milligan, Sykes, Galton and Simpson in the 1950s.
- Wappl, Michael (2009). "The goon show - pioneers of absurd humour : a cultural and linguistic analysis of the language of humour". English Studies Thesis (Diplom). University of Graz.PDF-Document
