= Major Bloodnok =

Major Denis Bloodnok
- The Goon Show character
- Last appearance: "The Last Goon Show of All"; The Goon Show; 1972
- Portrayed by: Peter Sellers

In-universe information
- Gender: Male
- Title: Major
- Occupation: British Army
- Nationality: British

Major Denis Bloodnok is a fictional character from the 1950s BBC Radio comedy The Goon Show. He was voiced by Peter Sellers.

== Basis of character ==
Bloodnok's army career is notable for cowardice and monetary irregularities. He was discharged after being found dressed as a woman, although he claimed it was carnival night.

He is repeatedly implied to be a womaniser. A prime example of this is in "Drums Along the Mersey" where he is thrown out of a boat for being caught with the captain's wife. Another example is featured in "The Histories of Pliny the Elder", when he says: "You know that saying 'Caesar's wife is above suspicion'? Well, I put an end to all that rubbish!" Also, in "The Jet-Propelled Guided NAAFI", when Moriarty arrives at his tent to bribe him into blowing up said NAAFI, he catches Bloodnok saying supposedly to a woman he was romancing, "Good night darling, I'll see you later", to which Milligan, playing Throat, replies "Good night, darling". In addition, during "Tales of Men's Shirts", he appears obsessed with women, answering a request for a favour with "What's her name?" Unique to the character is that he has his own leitmotif, a cheerful pseudo-parade melody which plays when Bloodnok makes his first appearance in an episode.

Bloodnok was based on the memories of Spike Milligan who remembered an old colonel who used to come to their shows in Italy. The Bill Hall Trio (which Milligan was a member of at the time) got friendly with him and also found he was notorious at missing his wallet every time he had to pay for a round of drinks and used to make up probably exaggerated stories of his military experiences. Milligan has stated in his memoirs that one night they put the Colonel in the wings, and whenever it got quiet, the Colonel shouted "These boys were at Cassino you know!" This probably got the biggest laugh of the night so Milligan brought the Colonel up to the stage to take the applause. Milligan was in contact with him up until the Colonel died in 1958.

== Regiments ==
He introduces himself in "Napoleon's Piano" as "Major Denis Bloodnok, late of the 3rd Disgusting Fusiliers, OBE, MT, MT and MT" (Seagoon asks what the MTs are for, to which Bloodnok responds "I get tuppence on each of them"). He is also said to be a former member of the 3rd Mounted NAAFI, the 3rd Regular Army Deserters, and the 3rd Disgusting Fusiliers. In "The Dreaded Batter Pudding Hurler (of Bexhill-on-Sea)", Major Bloodnok is officer commanding of the 56th Heavy Underwater Artillery (the real 56th Heavy Regiment, Royal Artillery was Milligan's regiment during WW2). "The Affair of the Lone Banana" sees Bloodnok as "Major Bloodnok, late of Zsa Zsa Gabor's Third Regular Husbands". In "The Mummified Priest", when Seagoon explains that he has come to Egypt to look for the tomb of a priest belonging to the third or fourth dynasties, Bloodnok replies, "Fourth Dynasties? My old regiment!" He has also claimed to have been a member of the 3rd Heavy Nudists ("Oh, what a cap badge they had!"). It is possible that he was at one time a member of a cavalry regiment: Roper's Light Horse are mentioned in more than one episode. In "The Last of the Smoking Seagoons", Major Bloodnok hides Ned of Wales in the Bloodnok Patriotic Military Museum; in doing so, he hears the cash register's ring, and reminisces: "Oh, that tune how it haunts me; it's my regimental march for the Third Mounted Cash Registers, you know". In "The Fear of Wages", Seagoon is the commander of the Third Armoured Thunderboxes ("who vanished in Burma ten years ago"), while Bloodnok is an officer in the regiment. In "Dishonoured", Bloodnok recruits Seagoon and Eccles into the 3rd Bombay Irish to fight the Red Bladder.

== Ambassador ==
Bloodnok often features in episodes as Neddie's former commanding officer, but in The Gold Plate Robbery he appears in the capacity of British ambassador to Marrakesh. After his usual tumultuous, flatulent introduction he is heard to muse aloud "Now, for a kip on full Ambassador's pay. Gad! I wonder what old Gladwyn Jebb's doing". Bloodnok then agrees to provide his old enemy the tribal leader The Red Bladder (played by Ray Ellington) with weapons and ammunition in return for a stolen gold plate, which, when quizzed, Bloodnok claims is actually the gold disc which he won for a hit record. Given that the episode contains a considerable amount of mockery by Milligan of the ruling class, the juxtaposition of Bloodnok as a lazy and venal diplomat in a North African setting with a reference to a distinguished British diplomat of the day may constitute another satirical swipe by the author – possibly a topical one in reference to the then-recent debacle of the Suez Crisis of 1956. The same lampooning of the English aristocracy and North African / Foreign Legion themes are also present in the episode "Under Two Floorboards", (Milligan's satirical take on P. C. Wren's 1924 novel Beau Geste), in which Bluebottle and Eccles play Neddie's brothers, who, despite being members of an aristocratic family and having taken degrees at university, are barely able to read – Bluebottle actually suggesting that, rather than read Beau Geste, they "put some wheels on it and pull it round" as if it were a child's toy dog.

== Running gags ==
Bloodnok is plagued by chronic gastro-intestinal problems and his entrance is usually accompanied by explosions or flatulent sound effects, the sound being created by the BBC Radiophonic Workshop (on the one occasion it was not played, Bloodnok cries, "I'm cured!") and quotes such as:

"The screens, nurse! Quick, the screens!"
"No wonder I can't go to parties any more..."
"No more curried eggs for me."
"It's a river steamer! And what a steamer..."

In "The Policy" Bloodnok sings a song called "The Indigestion Waltz".

== Catch phrases ==
- "It's Hell in there!" – typically about somewhere hot, crowded etc. or his own quarters and/or latrine, typically after a bout of flatulence.
- "I say, you're cutting it rather fine, aren't you?" – after another character has uttered seemingly contradictory statements.
- "I don't know who you are sir, or where you come from, but you've done me a power of good." – often shortened to "you've (or "that's") done me a power of good". In "The Gold Plate Robbery" the catchphrase was set to music.

== Other characters ==
In several episodes Bloodnok has an Indian manservant called Singhiz Thing, voiced by Milligan.

Bloodnok's arch enemy is "The Red Bladder", voiced by Goons musician Ray Ellington.

== See also ==
- Il Capitano
