= 2005 in British television =

This is a list of British television-related events in 2005.

== Events ==
=== January ===
- 1 January
  - Sky takes over production of Five News from ITN. The first scheduled Sky produced news programme had been due to air on 3 January, but two shorter bulletins for 1 and 2 January are hastily added to provide updates following the 2004 Boxing Day Indian Ocean tsunami.
  - Fox Kids UK finally rebrands to Jetix, as part of a global rebranding package by ABC Cable Networks Group. The first programme shown is Super Robot Monkey Team Hyperforce Go!.
- 5 January – Desperate Housewives makes its initial UK debut, at 10:00pm on Channel 4. Overnight figures indicate it achieves an audience of 4.4 million viewers, becoming the second highest rating debut for an American series in the channel's history, behind ER in 1995.
- 8 January – Jerry Springer: The Opera, featuring Jesus, Mary and God as guests on The Jerry Springer Show, airs on BBC Two, despite protests from Christian Voice and other groups.
- 10 January
  - Christian Voice confirms plans to launch a private blasphemy prosecution against the BBC for screening Jerry Springer: The Opera. The group subsequently attempts to prosecute BBC Director-General Mark Thompson, but their bid is rejected by the High Court. An attempt to overrule that decision is also rejected in December 2007.
  - Vote for Me, a contest to find an independent Parliamentary candidate, makes its debut on ITV.
- 11 January – Debut of the six-part BBC Two documentary series Auschwitz: The Nazis and 'The Final Solution' which tells the story of Auschwitz concentration camp. The final part is aired on 15 February.
- 14 January – ITV's Vote for Me contest is won by former lawyer and convicted fraudster Rodney Hylton-Potts, who presents a "cabbies manifesto" that includes halting immigration, scrapping the Human Rights Act and legalising all drugs. However, the programme is soon caught up in controversy because of the winning candidate's extreme political views. Hylton-Potts goes on to stand against Conservative leader Michael Howard as a candidate for Folkestone and Hythe at the general election, but comes in seventh place and loses his deposit.
- 21 January – The auction channel bid-up.tv is rebranded as bid.tv.
- 23 January – Happy Mondays dancer Mark Berry, known professionally as Bez wins the third series of Celebrity Big Brother.
- 26 January – Debut of The Rotters' Club on BBC Two, a three-part adaptation of Jonathan Coe's novel of the same name about growing up in 1970s Birmingham, scripted by Dick Clement and Ian La Frenais.
- 27 January – Holocaust Memorial Day and the 60th anniversary of the liberation of Auschwitz concentration camp are observed in the UK. BBC Two and BBC News 24 air Auschwitz Remembered, a special news programme providing coverage of memorial events.

=== February ===
- 3 February – An audience member on the evening's edition of Question Time uses the show's final question to propose to his girlfriend, who says yes. It is the first time a marriage proposal has occurred on the programme in its 25-year history.
- 8 February – Teachers' TV, run by the Department for Education and Skills, launches on Sky Digital (channel 686) and Freeview.
- 9 February – The Africa-based BBC journalist and producer Kate Peyton is killed in a shooting incident in Mogadishu, Somalia while reporting on that country's nascent peace process.
- 16 February – The first series of the UK version of The Apprentice with businessman Alan Sugar debuts on BBC Two.
- 18 February – Adele Silva will reprise her role as Emmerdale temptress Kelly Windsor five years after leaving the series, it is reported.
- 19 February – EastEnders celebrates its 20th anniversary on the air, airing a special episode in which Dirty Den Watts is killed by his new wife Chrissie. 14.34 million watch the episode (shown on 18 February). It is the UK's second highest rated programme of 2005 (the first is an episode of Coronation Street three days later).
- 21 February – MasterChef relaunches as MasterChef Goes Large.
- 22 February – Eamonn Holmes announces he will step down from his role as a GMTV presenter after twelve years.
- 23 February – UKTV Style Gardens, a channel dedicated to gardening programmes, launches.
- 24 February – ITV airs another episode of its police drama The Bill to feature a storyline in which characters are killed off in a fire at Sun Hill police station. Computer generated imagery is used because producing a real explosion and fireball ripping through the station corridors is not possible.
- 26 February – Sound TV, known pre-launch as The Great British Television Channel, launches on Sky Digital (588). It closes in the Autumn.

=== March ===
- 3 March – Irish Taoiseach Bertie Ahern opens RTÉ's new studios in London, based at Millbank opposite the Houses of Parliament.
- 4 March – Channel 4 signs a £1m deal with Appletiser to sponsor repeat episodes of Friends during 2005.
- 5 March – Cat Deeley presents her final edition of CD:UK, after 6 years.
- 10 March – BBC One airs an edition of Question Time from Changhai, China, as part of the BBC's China Week.
- 11 March – BBC One airs the tenth Comic Relief fundraiser. Highlights include a crossover between Antiques Roadshow and The Vicar of Dibley, as well as specials of Little Britain and Blind Date.
- 17 March – ITV signs up Jerry Springer to present a daytime talk show to replace Trisha.
- 19 March – Ahead of the return of Doctor Who later in the month, BBC Two airs a "Doctor Who Night", with three programmes celebrating the series. The Story of Doctor Who features cast and crew, including Tom Baker, Peter Davison, Colin Baker and Sylvester McCoy discussing the original series. Some Things You Need to Know About Doctor Who provides a bitesize guide to the programme. Finally John Humphrys presents a Doctor Who special of Mastermind in which fans answer questions about the series.
- 20 March
  - BBC Director General Mark Thompson announces BBC staff of 27,000 will be cut by 3,780.
  - Actress Kim Medcalf, who plays Sam Mitchell in EastEnders speaks to the Sunday Mirror about her decision to leave the series, and her plans to focus on stage acting. Her final scenes will be filmed in May and her final onscreen appearance will be in November.
- 23 March – Five announces plans to move its Trisha Goddard show to a morning slot from April to rival ITV's forthcoming The Springer Show.
- 26 March
  - Nine years after its last new episode and sixteen years since its last regular run, Doctor Who returns to BBC One for a new series, the twenty-seventh in total since 1963. Christopher Eccleston and Billie Piper star. An average 10.81 million viewers, over 40% of the watching audience, tune in, winning its timeslot and making it No. 3 BBC show and No. 7 across all channels for the week. The premiere episode of the revival, "Rose", written by Russell T Davies, goes on to become the UK's seventh highest rated programme of 2005.
  - Gordon Hendricks, performing as Elvis Presley wins the sixteenth and final series of Stars in Their Eyes. He is the second Elvis impersonator to win the contest. Stars in Their Eyes continues until the following year, with a final junior series and a number of celebrity specials.
- 30 March
  - As a test trial, the small Welsh towns of Ferryside and Llansteffan have their analogue television signals switched off. The trial proves a success and the digital switchover fully begins two and a half years later in Cumbria.
  - Only days after his having debuted as the Ninth Doctor, the BBC announces that Christopher Eccleston will be leaving Doctor Who after only one season.
  - A UK version of Pakistan's Geo TV is launched on Sky Digital EPG 838.

=== April ===
- 1 April – Thomasina Miers wins the 2005 series of MasterChef Goes Large.
- 2 April – Digital channel BBC Four broadcasts a live re-make of the famous 1953 science-fiction drama The Quatermass Experiment. The production is the first live drama broadcast by the BBC for over twenty years, and draws BBC Four's second highest audience to date, with an average of 482,000 viewers.
- 4 April – BBC Four airs Speak No Evil – The Story of the Broadcast Ban, a documentary recalling the 1988 broadcasting restrictions imposed by the Government of Margaret Thatcher on organisations in Northern Ireland believed to support terrorism.
- 5 April – It is reported that Ofcom may fine ITV Central for broadcasting a pre-recorded late Central News bulletin for the East Midlands.
- 8 April – 13.03 million viewers watch Ken Barlow tie the knot with Deirdre Rachid on Coronation Street, one day before the wedding of Charles, Prince of Wales, and Camilla Parker Bowles (7.36 million viewers watch). The scheduling move echoes Ken and Deirdre's first wedding, which occurred two days before Charles's wedding to Diana in 1981, and which also beat the Royal wedding in the television ratings.
- 11 April – ITV1 refreshes its daytime schedule under the brand name ITV Day, which features established programmes such as This Morning and Loose Women joined by a whole host of new shows over the coming months. The ITV Lunchtime News is also extended to an hour as part of the schedule refresh.
- 14 April – The BBC removes advice from its website warning that Doctor Who is too scary to be watched by children under the age of eight, describing the statement as "a mistake".
- 16 April – David Tennant is announced as the Tenth Doctor.
- 18 April – Launch of the teleshopping channel iBuy.
- 23 April – Celebrity Wrestling debuts on ITV1. It lasts for four weeks on Saturday evenings, before the second half of the series is demoted to Sunday mornings due to low ratings and poor reviews from critics.
- 27 April – Eamonn Holmes presents his final edition of GMTV after twelve years with the broadcaster.
- 28 April – BBC One airs a special election edition of Question Time, featuring the leaders of the three main political parties. Tony Blair (Labour), Michael Howard (Conservative) and Charles Kennedy (Liberal Democrats) are each questioned for 30 minutes by the audience.

=== May ===
- 3 May – The Sun reports that Labour Party chiefs are concerned that the 5 May episode of EastEnders in which Dot Cotton learns to drive could distract viewers from voting.
- 4 May – Tim Campbell, a 27-year-old transport manager with London Underground, wins the first series of The Apprentice. His prize is a £100,000 job with Alan Sugar's firm, Amstrad.
- 5–6 May – Coverage of the 2005 general election is shown on British television. The Labour Party attains a third successive general election victory.
- 7 May – Family Affairs wins Best Storyline at the British Soap Awards for a story in which a couple discover a family friend has been abusing their daughter.
- 9 May – Corpus Christi College, Oxford wins the 2004–05 series of University Challenge, beating University College London 250–140.
- 13 May – To celebrate the 80th birthday of Queen Elizabeth II in 2006, Rolf Harris is to create an oil portrait of her as part of a special edition of his BBC One show Rolf on Art, it is announced. The programme airs on New Year's Day 2006.
- 16 May –
  - BBC Weather relaunches, changing from 2D to 3D graphics.
  - ITV launches Love Island, a rival to Big Brother. This appears to be a ratings flop.
- 19 May – Eamonn Holmes has signed a deal with Sky News to present their early morning programme Sky News Sunrise, it is reported.
- 21 May – Greece's Helena Paparizou wins the 2005 Eurovision Song Contest (staged in Kyiv) with "My Number One".
- 23 May – Over one-third of BBC staff join a strike in response to proposed job cuts at the corporation.
- 26 May – BBC One airs a special edition of Question Time from Paris, France, ahead of the French referendum on the European Constitution.
- 29 May – BBC One airs the final edition of Breakfast with Frost after a twelve-year run.
- 30 May – Fifi and the Flowertots, a new stop motion animated series for children created by Keith Chapman, the creator of Bob the Builder, begins its screening on Five.
- 31 May – David Easter, who plays villain Pete Callan in Family Affairs, is to leave the series in September, it is announced.

=== June ===
- 5 June – BBC covers the finals of football's UEFA Women's Championship for the first time starting with the 2005 edition in England.
- 18 June – Christopher Eccleston's final episode of the Ninth Doctor in Doctor Who, "The Parting of the Ways", is broadcast on BBC One. David Tennant becomes the Tenth Doctor in the same episode.
- 20 June – Former nightclub owner Fran Cosgrave and presenter Jayne Middlemiss win the first series of Love Island.
- 25 June – The Girl in the Café, a comedy-drama by Richard Curtis made as part of the global Make Poverty History campaign is shown by both BBC One in the United Kingdom and HBO in the United States on the same day.
- 26 June – Countdown presenter Richard Whiteley dies at Leeds General Infirmary following a short illness. His final episodes air between 28 June and 1 July.
- 29 June – CBeebies airs the last episode of children's show Balamory. It is set to be revived in 2026.

=== July ===
- 1 July – Channel 4 broadcasts the last episode of Countdown to be hosted by Richard Whiteley.
- 2 July – Broadcast of Live 8, a string of benefit concerts, in the G8 states and South Africa. They are timed to precede the 31st G8 summit being held at the Gleneagles Hotel in Auchterarder, Scotland from 6–8 July; they also coincide with the 20th anniversary of Live Aid.
- 4 July – The BBC apologises to viewers after a computer malfunction causes its new 3D weather graphics to freeze.
- 6 July – London wins the bid to host the 2012 Summer Olympics. The announcement of the decision is broadcast live on BBC One and as a newsflash on all other major terrestrial networks.
- 7 July
  - Regular programming is suspended by major networks to provide ongoing news coverage after a series of co-ordinated terrorist bombings strike London's public transport system during the morning rush hour. BBC One makes a news report before Homes Under the Hammer at 10am, only to interrupt it twenty-one minutes later to simulcast BBC News 24, when the gravity of the incident becomes clearer. ITV1 breaks during the commercial break of The Jeremy Kyle Show (only in its fourth day on air) to simulcast the ITV News Channel news coverage at 10.12am, while Five airs a breaking news ticker during The Wright Stuff, later interrupting the programme at 10.48am to broadcast Sky News. ITV1 then airs the ITV Lunchtime News (without opening credits) with Mark Austin and Andrea Catherwood in its usal time slot, with Five switching by then to blanket news coverage, presented by Kate Sanderson. BBC One's One O'Clock News is extended to fifty-five minutes, with Huw Edwards presenting the newscast from the Westminster studio, joined by Darren Jordon for five minutes at BBC Television Centre. By 1.05pm, Sky 1 airs Sky News, with BBC One airing a five-minute regional news magazine at 1.55pm. Normal programming resumes on Five at 2.03pm with the film The Spoilers. At the same time, MTV, VH1, TMF, VH2 and VH1 Classic suspends all scheduled programming and are showing continuous music videos, with local channels Channel M and Solent TV doing the same thing, this time showing a simulcast of EuroNews and Sky News respectively. BBC One and ITV's children programming then moves to their secondary channels, with CBBC (alongside the Neighbours afternoon broadcast) airing on BBC Two and ITV2 broadcasting CITV. ITV1 resumes its regular schedule at 7pm, with Emmerdale, followed by local newscasts (airing one and a half hour later than planned) and The Bill, before airing Target London: An ITV News Special, a two-hour news special from 9 to 11pm, presented by Trevor McDonald, with Britain's Biggest Brood following until midnight, when normal programming resumes with a rerun of the American series Providence. BBC One suspends blanket news coverage to air EastEnders at 7.30pm, but airs a Newsnight special at 8pm, with Jeremy Paxman presenting. The documentary series Elephant Diaries follows at 8.30pm, one and a half hour later than scheduled, with Huw Edwards making a ten-minute newsflash at 9pm, with a repeat of a 2000 Ground Force about Nelson Mandela airing instead of what was supposed to be the last programme of the series, which was scheduled to air at 8pm, displaced by the aformentioned Newsnight special. BBC One's last programme change was at 12.25am: the BBC News 24 simulcast (originally due to air on BBC Two until 2am) replaces both the film Fast Company (who moves to BBC Two) and the Sign Zone programme block. Finally, a news special airs at 10.50pm on Channel 4, presented by Jon Snow. Among the programmes to be pulled from the day's schedule, are the lunchtime showing of Neighbours, Cash in the Attic and Diagnosis: Murder on BBC One, This Morning and Heartbeat on ITV1, and lunchtime repeats of Family Affairs and Home and Away, alongside BrainTeaser on Five. On 12 September, the BBC defends its decision to await corroboration before giving details of the event, but on 26 September Ofcom censures the BBC and other broadcasters for insensitive use of pictures.
  - BBC One airs an edition of Question Time from Johannesburg, South Africa as world leaders convene for the 31st G8 summit in Scotland, and following the Live 8 concerts.
- 8 July – The Animals of Farthing Wood airs on CBBC for the very last time but continues to air on RTÉ2 in Ireland.
- 12 July – BBC One airs the 250th episode of Holby City.
- 17 July – After forty-one years broadcasting on BBC One, music show Top of the Pops is switched to BBC Two due to declining audiences. This is not enough to save it, and it is axed the following year.
- 19 July – Jessie Wallace confirms she will leave EastEnders at the end of the year, having played Kat Slater since 2000.
- 21 July – Regular programming is once again suspended by major networks to provide ongoing news coverage of the 21 July 2005 London attempted bombings which disrupted the London Transport network.

=== August ===
- 1 August – BBC Broadcast, formerly Broadcasting & Presentation and responsible for the playout and branding of all BBC Channels, is sold to Creative Broadcast Services, owned by the Macquarie Capital Alliance Group and Macquarie Bank. It is renamed Red Bee Media on 31 October.
- 2 August – Five announces its soap, Family Affairs will be axed at the end of the year.
- 4 August – BBC One airs Sinatra: Dark Star, a documentary investigating rumours of Frank Sinatra's links to organised crime.
- 10 August – Lost premieres on Channel 4, garnering an audience of 6 million viewers, overtaking ER as the highest rated debut for a US series in the channel's history.
- 12 August – Anthony Hutton wins series six of Big Brother.
- 17 August – ITV announces plans to launch a children's channel to rival CBBC.
- 22 August – Peppa Pig makes its debut in the United States, on Cartoon Network's Tickle U programming block, re-dubbed with American voice actors. This turns out to be a flop, so Nick Jr airs the original British version.

=== September ===
- 3 September – After several revamps and presenting changes, BBC One airs the final edition of its children's entertainment series The Saturday Show.
- 5 September – Pitt & Kantrop debuts on BBC1
- 7 September –
  - The BBC and ITV announce plans to launch Freesat, a Free-to-air satellite television series to rival Sky.
  - Channel Five airs The Spy Who Stole My Life, a television documentary about conman and imposter Robert Hendy-Freegard, who masqueraded as an MI5 agent.
- 8 September – Faze TV, a British digital channel aimed at gay men, cancels its launch after failing to secure sufficient funding to deliver "sufficient quality."
- 11 September – BBC One launches Sunday AM, a Sunday morning current affairs programme presented by Andrew Marr.
- 12 September – In an interview with The Guardian, the BBC Director of News and Current Affairs Helen Boaden defends the broadcaster's decision to stick with initial reports of a power surge on the London Underground on the morning of 7 July until actual events could be corroborated, saying it was the right thing to do. "Some of our competitors talked immediately of 90 dead. They talked about three bus bombs. That was off a range of various wire services and it was complete speculation and we wouldn't go with that. We would be careful – we would try to check things out."
- 14 September – Supernanny UK airs the episode in which Sue and Paul Young and their sons Nathaniel, Caleb, Benjamin, Jacob and Joel's horrific behaviour has led to corporal punishment. With so many children to deal with, the house has become a case of mob rule as the elder boys spit, fight and destroy things. Desperate to regain control, Sue and Paul have resorted, unsuccessfully, to physical punishment, including smacking their boys with slippers and wooden spoons.
- 17 September – Ant & Dec's Gameshow Marathon debuts on ITV1, as part of ITV's 50th anniversary celebrations. The seven week series features celebrity contestants taking part in one-off revivals of seven of ITV's classic gameshows – The Price is Right, Take Your Pick, The Golden Shot, Sale of the Century, Play Your Cards Right, Bullseye and Family Fortunes – to raise money for their chosen charities and win prizes for viewers at home. The series is a success and leads to revived series of both The Price is Right and Family Fortunes airing on ITV1 the following year whilst Bullseye is also revived by Challenge.
- 19 September – The most famous children's classic television character Muffin the Mule (who disappeared from TV screens in the mid-1950s) is back with a brand new 2D animated series on BBC Two.
- 20 September
  - After seven and a half years, Emmerdale sees a new sequence to the opening titles of the series, with the same 1998 theme music alongside another helicopter montage, this time marginally slower and without the actors and the closing credits are generic ITV Network style credits over a continuous shot of the village, again from a helicopter, but filmed from a different angle.
  - BBC One airs Derailed, a docudrama dealing with the 1999 Ladbroke Grove rail crash.
- 22 September – ITV airs a second live episode of The Bill to mark the broadcaster's 50th year on air.
- 23 September – It is announced that Des Lynam will succeed Richard Whiteley as presenter of Channel 4's Countdown, with his first episode airing on 31 October.
- 25 September
  - ITV1 airs an episode of A Touch of Frost called "Near Death Experience" to mark the broadcaster's 50th year on air.
  - BBC One airs the network premiere of the 2003 Christmas-themed romantic comedy film Love Actually starring Hugh Grant, Liam Neeson, Colin Firth, Laura Linney, Emma Thompson and Mr. Bean star Rowan Atkinson.
- 26 September – The BBC is censured by Ofcom for its coverage of the London bombings on 7 July. Of particular concern to them was an incident in which footage of a man being carried by stretcher into the Royal London Hospital was shown as a BBC News 24 presenter commentated "Let's just take a look at some of the pictures coming from the Royal London." Ofcom concludes that "the pictures were used generically and the commentary did not reflect the seriousness of the images being transmitted". Channel 4 News is also criticised for not "fully reflecting the enormity of the images being reflected", although it had not breached the Ofcom regulations as the images were not used casually. ITV News is not criticised, however, because it provided a "clear narrative context [with] sensitive accompanying reporting".
- 26–27 September – No Direction Home, Martin Scorsese's documentary on Bob Dylan, receives its broadcast premiere on BBC Two in the UK, under the Arena banner.
- 30 September – CBBC identity relaunched, with its second marketing campaign since the launch of the CBBC Channel.
- September – ITV celebrates its 50th anniversary with a collection of special programmes, under the name ITV 50.

=== October ===
- 3 October
  - BBC Four airs Our Hidden Lives, a dramatisation of the novel of the same name by Simon Garfield that explores the lives of four people on 8 May 1945 as World War II comes to an end. The film stars Richard Briers, Sarah Parish, Ian McDiarmid and Lesley Sharp, and is the centrepiece of the BBC's Lost Decades season.
  - Live action Icelandic health and fitness based kids' TV show LazyTown makes it debut on both CBeebies & Nick Jr.
- 5 October – The 6am CBeebies programming block on BBC Two ends and is replaced by an hour of Pages from Ceefax.
- 8 October – BBC One airs the 500th episode of Casualty.
- 10 October – More4, a digital channel from Channel 4 offering factual content, launches.
- 24 October – Sky News moves to new studios, with a new schedule and on-air look.
- 25 October – The relaunched Doctor Who is the major winner at the annual National Television Awards in the UK, taking the Most Popular Drama award, with its stars Christopher Eccleston and Billie Piper winning Most Popular Actor and Most Popular actress.
- 27 October–16 December – Bleak House, a 15-episode adaptation of the Charles Dickens novel of the same name designed to capture a soap opera-style audience by using Dickens's original serial structure in half-hour episodes is broadcast on BBC One.
- 28 October – Sheffield-based rock band Arctic Monkeys make their first appearance on BBC Two's Later...with Jools Holland.
- 29 October – The snooker series Pot Black is revived for the third time but rather than a regular series of one frame matches, It is shown as part of that day's Grandstand with all matches taking place on the day, While most of the matches up to the semi-finals are shown in highlights, the final is shown live. This format will remain for another two years.
- 31 October
  - Sky3 is launched on British digital terrestrial and satellite platforms. On the same day Sky Mix is rebranded as Sky Two, and Sky Travel ceases transmission on Freeview.
  - The first episode of Countdown hosted by Des Lynam airs, as does the first episode of Deal Or No Deal, reviving Noel Edmonds's TV career on Channel 4.

=== November ===
- 1 November
  - ITV4, a digital channel aimed at men, is launched in the UK. It is launched on Sky Digital Channel 120 on 7 November after airing on the Men & Motors channel space for a few days.
  - ITV1 airs The Gunpowder Plot: Exploding the Legend in which Richard Hammond recreates elements of the Gunpowder Plot if Guy Fawkes was successful in blowing up the House of Lords.
- 3 November – A special edition of Question Time featuring David Cameron and David Davis, the two candidates in the forthcoming Conservative Party leadership election.
- 7–28 November – BBC One broadcasts ShakespeaRe-Told, a series of four adaptations of William Shakespeare's plays based in 21st century Britain. The plays in order are Much Ado About Nothing, Macbeth, The Taming of the Shrew and A Midsummer Night's Dream.
- 11 November – EastEnders is the first British drama to feature a two-minute silence. This episode later goes on to win the British Soap Award for 'Best Single Episode'.
- 16 November – Lucy Ratcliffe wins the first cycle of Britain's Next Top Model, securing for herself a modelling contract among other prizes.
- 17 November – Little Britain moves to BBC1 due to it being a success on BBC3, kicking things off with the first episode of the third series. Tom Baker provides this evening's continuity announcements on BBC1.
- 18 November
  - BBC One broadcasts this year's annual Children in Need appeal. It contains several highlights including Catherine Tate in EastEnders, the BBC Newsreaders performing Bohemian Rhapsody, and a brand new Doctor Who adventure. The first to fully star David Tennant as the Doctor, the 7-minute episode directly follows on from "The Parting of the Ways" and directly leads on to "The Christmas Invasion".
  - It is announced that Five has bought a stake in DTT's pay-TV operator, Top Up TV.
- 22 November – Producers of ITV's I'm a Celebrity...Get Me Out of Here! confirm that contestant Elaine Lordan will not be returning to the show following a stay in hospital. She had twice collapsed on the set of the jungle-based reality show, but has been given a clean bill of health by doctors.
- 28 November – The actress and I'm a Celebrity contestant Kimberley Davies is taken to hospital with a suspected fractured rib after she is injured in a stunt that goes wrong. Davies had jumped from a helicopter as part of one of the series' "bush tucker trials" when the incident occurred. Responding to criticism that it had not taken the correct safety precautions, ITV says that Davies was given a full safety briefing before she performed the stunt.
- 29 November – Kimberley Davies withdraws from I'm a Celebrity...Get Me Out of Here!

=== December ===
- 2 December – BBC Three's weeknight news bulletin The 7 O'Clock News is broadcast for the final time. It is axed following a report into the BBC's digital output which claims that the show "achieves nothing and attracts tiny audiences".
- 3 December – ITV1 screens the British terrestrial television premiere of Harry Potter and the Chamber of Secrets, the second film in the Harry Potter series. Overnight viewing figures indicate it is watched by an audience of eight million (a 37% audience share). The evening's edition of The X Factor, screened after Chamber of Secrets, is watched by 9.7 million viewers (a 42% audience share), giving ITV1 its best ratings since February 2002.
- 5 December – Carol Thatcher wins the fifth series of I'm a Celebrity...Get Me Out of Here!.
- 7–16 December – Space Cadets is shown on Channel 4, a hoax reality TV show where the contestants believe they are in a Space Shuttle orbiting Earth, when in fact they are in a set in a disused aircraft hangar in Suffolk.
- 10 December – Westlife's version of "You Raise Me Up" is voted the 2005 Record of the Year by ITV viewers, the fourth time the Irish boy band have won the title.
- 11 December – Cricketer Andrew Flintoff is named as this year's BBC Sports Personality of the Year.
- 15 December – Sir Trevor McDonald makes his final ITN news broadcast after over 25 years. As a tribute, the closing theme tune for the News at Ten Thirty tonight is replaced with the News at Ten theme used from 1992 to 1999, McDonald having presented the show during that time. McDonald would later make a brief return to ITN during 2008 to help relaunch News at Ten.
- 17 December – Cricketer Darren Gough and dancing partner Lilia Kopylova win the third series of Strictly Come Dancing. Shayne Ward wins the second series of The X Factor on the same evening.
- 19 December – Rolf Harris unveils his portrait of the Queen at Buckingham Palace.
- 21 December – The BBC is to trial a three-month experiment in which its Saturday morning schedules for BBC One and BBC Two will be swapped. The changes, taking effect from January 2006, are being implemented because of frequent scheduling changes caused by big events and breaking news stories, and will mean children's programming will be absent from BBC One's Saturday morning lineup for the first time since 1968. This is not enough to save them and the Saturday morning children's programmes will be axed six months later.
- 23 December
  - The ITV News Channel closes.
  - Five airs the 4000th episode of Home and Away.
- 25 December
  - BBC One airs:
    - The Doctor Who Christmas Special, "The Christmas Invasion"; this episode marks David Tennant's first full-length story as the Tenth Doctor.
    - The network television premiere of Pixar's 1999 animated sequel Toy Story 2.
    - A Christmas special of The Two Ronnies Sketchbook recorded on 5 July which, following Ronnie Barker's death on 3 October, forms in part a tribute to him and attracts 7.93M viewers.
    - The departure of Shane Richie and Jessie Wallace from EastEnders when their characters Alfie and Kat Moon leave for America.
  - ITV1 airs the 2000 Christmas film The Grinch for a third time.
- 29 December – The last edition of Click Online broadcast under its original title before it is renamed Click.
- 30 December
  - Five airs the final episode of its soap Family Affairs.
  - BBC One airs the network television premiere of Insomnia.

== Debuts ==
=== BBC One ===
- 1 January – Star Spell (2005)
- 3 January – BB3B (2005)
- 7 January – According to Bex (2005)
- 21 January – 29 Minutes of Fame (2005)
- 13 March – Supervolcano (2005)
- 26 March – Doctor Who (2005–present)
- 27 March – Fingersmith (2005)
- 6 June – Gordon the Garden Gnome (2005)
- 25 June – The Girl in the Café (2005)
- 5 September – Pitt & Kantrop (2005–2007)
- 6 September – Medium (2005–2011)
- 9 September – The Green Green Grass (2005–2009)
- 11 September – Sunday AM (2005–2021)
- 27 September – Love Soup (2005, 2008)
- 27 October – Bleak House (2005)
- 30 October – Rocket Man (2005)
- 7 November – Shakespeare Re-Told (4 eps – Much Ado about Nothing / Macbeth / The Taming of the Shrew / A Midsummer Night's Dream) (2005)

=== BBC Two ===
- 7 January – Bill Oddie's How to Watch Wildlife (2005–2006)
- 26 January – The Rotters' Club (2005)
- 16 February – The Apprentice (2005–present)
- 21 February – Around the World in 80 Treasures (2005)
- 27 February – Help (2005)
- 5 May – The Robinsons (2005)
- 10 May – The Monastery (2005)
- 30 May – Springwatch (2005–present)
- 5 June – Mock the Week (2005–present)
- 6 July – To the Ends of the Earth (2005)
- 21 July – Extras (2005–2007)
- 22 July – Coast (2005–2015)
- 3 October – LazyTown (2004–2014) (UK version)
- 22 October – American Dad! (2005–present)
- 8 November – Autumnwatch (2005–2022)
- 15 November – Rome (2005–2007)
- 13 December – Magnificent 7 (2005)

=== BBC Three ===
- 11 January – Ideal (2005–2011)
- 16 January – Twisted Tales (spin-off from Spine Chillers) (2005)
- 13 March – Casanova (2005)
- 20 September – Tittybangbang (2005–2007)
- 23 October – Funland (2005)

=== BBC Four ===
- 2 March – Kenneth Tynan: In Praise of Hardcore (2005)
- 19 April – Twenty Thousand Streets Under the Sky (2005)
- 19 May – The Thick of It (2005–2012)

=== CBeebies ===
- 7 November – Charlie and Lola (2005–2008)

=== ITV (1/2/3/4) ===
- 1 January – Scream! If You Want to Get Off (2005)
- 5 February – Toonattik (2005–2011)
- 12 February – New Captain Scarlet (2005)
- 27 February – The Walk (2005)
- 6 March – Falling (2005)
- 20 March – Diamond Geezer (2005; 2007)
- 27 March – Colditz (2005)
- 2 April – Hit Me Baby One More Time (2005)
- 10 April – Malice Aforethought (2005)
- 11 April –
  - ITV Day (2005–2006)
  - King Arthur's Disasters (2005–2006)
- 15 April – Splash Camp (2005)
- 23 April – Celebrity Wrestling (2005)
- 10 May – Pocoyo (2005–2010, 2016–present)
- 16 May – Love Island (2005–2006)
- 13 June – Cash Cab (2005–2006)
- 4 July – The Jeremy Kyle Show (2005–2019)
- 9 July – Grandma Jane's Garden Adventures (2005–2010)
- 5 September – Marian, Again (2005)
- 14 September – The Golden Hour (2005)
- 24 September – Afterlife (2005–2006)
- 29 September – Mike Bassett: Manager (2005)
- 10 October – Vincent (2005–2006)
- 19 October – Cold Blood (2005–2008)
- 12 December – Secret Smile (2005)
- 18 December – Wallis & Edward (2005)

=== Channel 4 ===
- 5 January – Desperate Housewives (2004–2012)
- 10 January – Come Dine with Me (2005–present)
- 11 February – Nathan Barley (2005)
- 7 March – Coach Trip (2005–2006, 2009–2012, 2013–present)
- 11 April – John Callahan's Quads! (2001–2002)
- 10 May – Bring Back... (2005–2009)
- 27 May – 18 Stone of Idiot (2005)
- 3 June – 8 Out of 10 Cats (2005–present)
- 7 June – Sugar Rush (2005–2006)
- 1 August – The House of Obsessive Compulsives (2005)
- 10 August – Lost (2004–2010)
- 31 August – It's Me or the Dog (2005–2008 Channel 4, 2008–2012 Sky)
- 29 September – Elizabeth I (2005)
- 30 September –
  - Spoons (2005)
  - Rock School (2005/6)
- 22 October – Power Rangers: SPD (2005)
- 31 October – Deal or No Deal (2005–2016)
- 8 November – Rajan and His Evil Hypnotists (2005)
- 15 November – The Ghost Squad (2005)
- 20 November – Not Forgotten (2005–2009)
- 27 November – The Queen's Sister (2005)

=== More4 ===
- 10 October – Launch of More4 News on new digital channel More4 (2005–2009).

=== Five ===
- 30 May – Fifi and the Flowertots (2005–2010)
- 9 June – House (2004–2012)
- 9 September – Swinging (2005–2006)

=== Cartoon Network UK ===
- 11 April – What's New, Scooby-Doo? (2002–2005)
- 9 May – Hi Hi Puffy Ami Yumi (2004–2006)
- 6 June – Battle B-Daman (2005–2006)
- 1 November – Robotboy (2005–2008)

=== Boomerang UK ===
- 1 November – Camp Lazlo (2005–2008)

=== Disney Channel UK ===
- 6 June – The Buzz on Maggie (6 June 2005 – 27 May 2006)

=== Playhouse Disney UK ===
- 11 April – Higglytown Heroes (11 April 2005 – 7 January 2008)
- 3 October – Little Einsteins (2005–2010)

=== Nickelodeon UK ===
- 3 January – Ned's Declassified School Survival Guide (2004–2007)
- 4 April –
  - Unfabulous (2005–2008)
  - Zoey 101 (2005–2008)

=== Nicktoons UK ===
- 14 January – My Life as a Teenage Robot (2005–2007)

=== Nick Jr. UK ===
- 3 October – LazyTown (2004–2014) (UK version)

=== Jetix UK ===
- 1 January – Super Robot Monkey Team Hyperforce Go! (2005–2008)

== Channels ==
=== New channels/streaming services ===
Date	Channel
23 February	UKTV Style Gardens
30 March	Geo TV UK
10 October	More4
31 October	Sky Three
1 November	ITV4
15 December	YouTube

=== Defunct channels ===
Date	Channel
23 December	ITV News Channel

=== Rebranded channels ===
Date	Old name	New name
31 October	Sky Mix	Sky Two

== Television shows ==
^{^[e]} signifies that this show has a related event in the Events section above.

=== Changes of network affiliation ===
Show	Moved from	Moved to
Trisha	ITV1	Five
Pinky and the Brain	ITV1	BBC One
Family Guy (Terrestrial rights)	Channel 4	BBC Two
Top of the Pops	BBC One	BBC Two
24	BBC Two	Sky One
South Park	Sky One	Paramount Comedy 1
WWE SmackDown!	Sky One	Sky Sports
WWE Bottom Line	Sky One	Sky Sports
WWE After Burn	Sky One	Sky Sports
WWE Heat	Sky One	Sky Sports
American Dragon: Jake Long	Disney Channel	ITV1 on CITV

- ^1 All these WWE shows became exclusive to Sky Sports

=== Returning this year after a break of one year or longer ===
- Muffin the Mule (1946–1955, 2005–2006)
- Doctor Who (1963–1989, 1996, 2005–present)
- Mr. Benn (1970–1972, 2005)
- Roobarb and Custard Too premieres (1974 BBC, 2005–2013 Channel 5)
- Willo the Wisp (1981–1984, 2005)
- Fireman Sam (1987–1994, 2005–2013)
- The Two Ronnies Sketchbook sequels to take over from The Two Ronnies (1971–1987, 1991, 1996, 2005)
- Family Guy (1999–2002, 2005–present)

== Continuing television shows ==
=== 1930s ===
- BBC Wimbledon (1937–1939, 1946–2019, 2021–present)
- Trooping the Colour (1937–1939, 1946–2019, 2023–present)
- The Boat Race (1938–1939, 1946–2019, 2021–present)

=== 1950s ===
- Panorama (1953–present)
- What the Papers Say (1956–2008)
- The Sky at Night (1957–present)
- Blue Peter (1958–present)
- Grandstand (1958–2007)

=== 1960s ===
- Coronation Street (1960–present)
- Songs of Praise (1961–present)
- Top of the Pops (1964–2006)
- Match of the Day (1964–present)
- The Money Programme (1966–2010)

=== 1970s ===
- Emmerdale (1972–present)
- Newsround (1972–present)
- Last of the Summer Wine (1973–2010)
- Arena (1975–present)
- One Man and His Dog (1976–present)
- Top Gear (1977–2001, 2002–present)
- Grange Hill (1978–2008)
- Ski Sunday (1978–present)
- Antiques Roadshow (1979–present)
- Question Time (1979–present)

=== 1980s ===
- Children in Need (1980–present)
- Postman Pat (1981, 1991, 1994, 1996, 2004–2008)
- Timewatch (1982–present)
- Countdown (1982–present)
- The Bill (1984–2010)
- Thomas & Friends (1984–2021)
- EastEnders (1985–present)
- Comic Relief (1985–present)
- Casualty (1986–present)
- ChuckleVision (1987–2009)
- This Morning (1988–present)
- The Simpsons (1989–present)

=== 1990s ===
- Have I Got News for You (1990–present)
- Room 101 (1994–2007, 2012–2018)
- Stars in Their Eyes (1990–2006, 2015)
- Heartbeat (1992–2010)
- Time Team (1994–2013)
- Top of the Pops 2 (1994–2017)
- Hollyoaks (1995–present)
- Arthur (1996–present)
- Never Mind the Buzzcocks (1996–2015)
- Silent Witness (1996–present)
- Midsomer Murders (1997–present)
- South Park (1997–present)
- King of the Hill (1997–2010)
- Who Wants to Be a Millionaire? (1998–2014)
- Bob the Builder (1998–present)
- Bremner, Bird and Fortune (1999–2010)
- British Soap Awards (1999–2019, 2022–present)
- Ed, Edd n Eddy (1999–2009)
- SpongeBob SquarePants (1999–present)
- Holby City (1999–2022)
- My Parents Are Aliens (1999–2006)

=== 2000s ===
- Doctors (2000–present)
- Big Brother (2000–2010, 2011–2018)
- The Weakest Link (2000–2012, 2017–present)
- The Kumars (2001–2006, 2014)
- Popworld (2001–2007)
- Real Crime (2001–2011)
- Flog It! (2002–2020)
- Foyle's War (2002–2015)
- I'm a Celebrity...Get Me Out of Here! (2002–present)
- Harry Hill's TV Burp (2002–2012)
- Spooks (2002–2011)
- River City (2002–2026)
- Daily Politics (2003–2018)
- Peep Show (2003–2015)
- All Grown Up! (2003–2008)
- Tiny Pop (2003–2008)
- New Tricks (2003–2015)
- Politics Show (2003–2011)
- QI (2003–present)
- The Royal (2003–2011)
- PointlessBlog (2003–2007)
- This Week (2003–2019)
- Strictly Come Dancing (2004–present)
- Doc Martin (2004–2022)
- Sea of Souls (2004–2007)
- Supernanny (2004–2008, 2010–2012)
- Shameless (2004–2013)
- The X Factor (2004–2018)

== Ending this year ==
Date	Show	Channel(s)	Debut(s)
30 January	Andy Pandy	CBeebies	1950 & 2002
30 January	Angelina Ballerina	CITV	2002
30 January	Up on the Roof	CITV on GMTV	2002
30 January	Diggin' It	CITV on GMTV	2003
30 January	Superstars	BBC	2003
30 January	Call My Bluff	BBC	1965
30 January	Cathedral	BBC	2005
14 February	The Crouches	BBC One	2003
25 March	The Powerpuff Girls	Channel 5 & Cartoon Network	1998
29 May	Breakfast with Frost	BBC	1993
16 June	UK Top 40	CBBC	2002
12 July	50/50	CBBC	1997
20 July	To the Ends of the Earth	BBC	2005
24 July	Ground Force	BBC	1997
3 August	Born and Bred	BBC	2002
18 August	Should I Worry About...?	BBC	2004
15 October	Star Spell	BBC	2005
23 October	Monarch of the Glen	BBC	2000
4 December	Rocket Man	BBC	2005
16 December	Bleak House	BBC	2005
25 December	The Two Ronnies Sketchbook	BBC	2005
30 December	Family Affairs	Channel 5	1997

== Births ==
Date	Name	Cinematic Credibility
25 February	Noah Jupe	British actor
15 March	Ellie Dadd	British actress (EastEnders)

== Deaths ==
Date	Name	Age	Known for
2 January	Cyril Fletcher	91	British comedian (That's Life!)
5 January	Gabrielle Daye	93	Actress (Bless Me Father, Coronation Street)
18 January	Gabrielle Brune	92	Actress
22 January	Patsy Rowlands	74	Actress (Bless This House, Hallelujah!)
9 February	Sergei Hackel	83	Russian Orthodox priest and broadcaster of BBC religious programmes
9 February	Kate Peyton	39	BBC journalist and producer
11 February	Stan Richards	74	Actor (Seth Armstrong in Emmerdale)
13 February	Harry Baird	73	Actor (Danger Man, UFO)
6 March	Tommy Vance	64	Television presenter (Top of the Pops)
9 March	Sheila Gish	62	Actress (The First Churchills, Jewels, The Brighton Belles)
10 March	Dave Allen	68	Irish comedian, host of solo shows on BBC1 and ITV.
23 March	David Kossoff	85	Actor (The Larkins)
28 March	Dave Freeman	82	Television comedy scriptwriter
2 April	Betty Bolton	99	Actress
11 April	John Bennett	76	Actor (Doctor Who, Porridge, The Avengers, Bergerac)
15 April	Margaretta Scott	93	Actress (All Creatures Great and Small)
21 April	Jimmy Thompson	79	Actor (Pinky and Perky, The Benny Hill Show, George and Mildred)
22 April	Norman Bird	80	Actor (Worzel Gummidge, Fawlty Towers, Ever Decreasing Circles, Yes Minister)
3 May	David Batchelor	63	Television sound mixer
14 May	Mary Treadgold	95	Television producer
1 June	Geoffrey Toone	94	Actor (Doctor Who)
3 June	Michael Billington	63	Actor (UFO)
13 June	Jonathan Adams	74	Actor (The Adventures of Sherlock Holmes, Yes Minister)
16 June	Alex McAvoy	77	Actor (The Vital Spark, The Bill, Dad's Army, Z-Cars)
26 June	Richard Whiteley	61	Presenter, host of Countdown.
30 June	Christopher Fry	97	Television scriptwriter
30 June	Ian Stirling	64	Television continuity announcer and actor
4 July	Bryan Coleman	94	Actor (Upstairs, Downstairs)
11 July	Gretchen Franklin	94	Actress (Ethel Skinner in EastEnders)
20 July	David Tomblin	74	Television director and producer
25 July	David Jackson	71	Actor (Blake's 7, Z-Cars)
9 August	Kay Tremblay	91	Actress (Road to Avonlea)
11 August	James Booth	77	Actor
22 August	Elizabeth Knight	60	Actress (It's Awfully Bad for Your Eyes, Darling)
25 August	Terence Morgan	83	Actor (Sir Francis Drake)
31 August	Michael Sheard	67	Actor (Mr Bronson in Grange Hill)
12 September	Ronald Leigh-Hunt	84	Actor (Danger Man, Doctor Who, Freewheelers)
23 September	Roger Brierley	70	Actor (Jeeves and Wooster, Ripping Yarns, Only Fools and Horses)
3 October	Ronnie Barker	76	Actor and comedian (The Two Ronnies, Porridge, The Frost Report)
16 October	Ursula Howells	83	Actress (Dixon of Dock Green, The Forsyte Saga, Bergerac, Casualty)
17 October	Leslie Duxbury	79	Television producer (Coronation Street)
20 October	Michael Gill	81	Television producer and director
25 October	Barbara Keogh	76	Actress (EastEnders)
31 October	Mary Wimbush	81	Actress (Poldark, Jeeves and Wooster, Century Falls)
7 November	Harry Thompson	45	Television producer and scriptwriter
7 November	Steve Whatley	46	Television presenter
19 November	John Timpson	77	Journalist and television presenter (Newsroom)
2 December	Leonard Lewis	78	Television director and producer

== See also ==
- 2005 in British music
- 2005 in British radio
- 2005 in the United Kingdom
- List of British films of 2005
