= The Long Banana Skin =

- First edition
- Author: Michael Bentine
- Genre: Autobiography
- Publisher: Wolfe
- Publication date: September 1975
- ISBN: 0-7234-0685-5

The Long Banana Skin is the first of three autobiographies by Michael Bentine, comedy entertainer, particularly known as a member of The Goons and for his television shows It's a Square World. It covers his life and entertainment career up to 1975. Subsequent autobiographical books are The Door Marked Summer (1981) and The Reluctant Jester (1992). The Daily Telegraph's reviewer explained, "The title, The Long Banana Skin, comes from the fact that Mr Bentine believes that fate is always lying in wait to remove his feet from under him when all seems to be going well."

The Telegraph's review estimated that half of the book dealt with Bentine's childhood and war service. He describes his early life growing up in Folkestone as well as his father's, and his, interest in psychic phenomena. The war years are covered from his attempts at joining the Royal Air Force and his subsequent service as Intelligence Officer on a Polish Wellington squadron, to his time with the 2nd Tactical Air Force (2nd TAF) in Europe and his experiences of the liberation of Bergen-Belsen concentration camp.

Post war the book covers his and his wife Clementina's trip to the United States and Australia and his work on The Goon Show and subsequent television programmes, It's a Square World, The Bumblies, and Michael Bentine's Potty Time – the title being a pun on a children's toilet ('potty'). Other episodes covered are his trip as part of the first hovercraft expedition up the Amazon River as well as his bombardment of the House of Commons with polystyrene cannonballs, fired from the cannons of a mock Chinese junk, as part of a sketch for It's a Square World.

Hardback Publisher: Wolfe (Sep 1975) ISBN 0-7234-0685-5

Paperback Publisher: New English Library (Sep 1976)

== Reception ==
The book made the Sunday Times best-seller list for non-fiction. When it appeared in paperback, The Times published a positive review: "very funny... It is a whirlwind book and I look forward to the next volume."
