= Flea circus =

Miniature circus sideshow

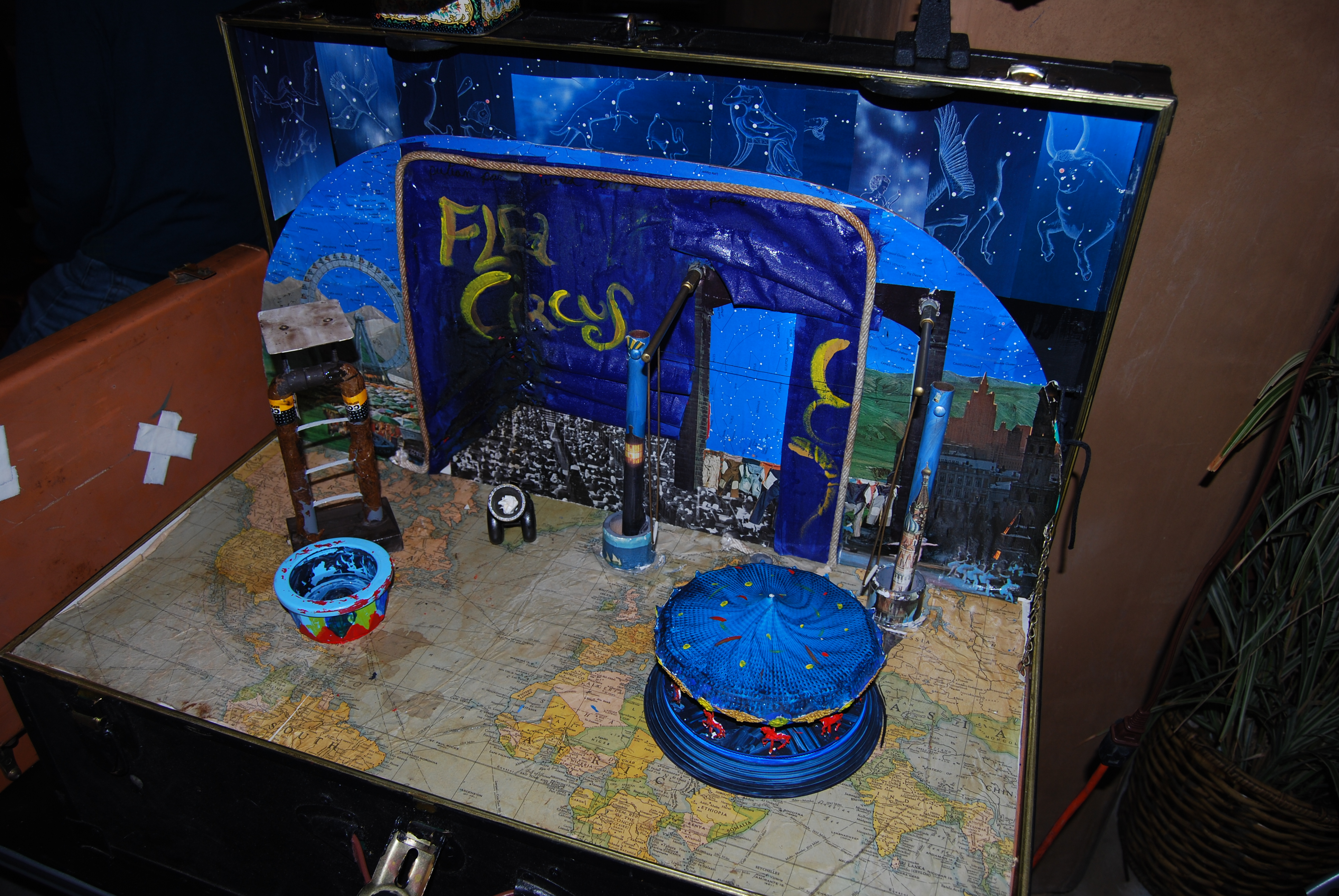
The flea circus of Maxfield Rubbish, San Diego, CA (2009)

A flea circus is a circus sideshow attraction in which fleas are attached (or appear to be attached) to miniature carts and other items, and encouraged to perform circus acts within a small housing.

== History ==
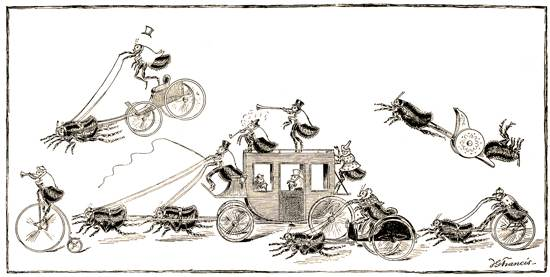
"The Go-As-You-Please Race, as seen through a Magnifying Glass", engraved by J. G. Francis, from an article by C. F. Holder in St. Nicholas Magazine, 1886

The first records of flea performances were from watchmakers who were demonstrating their metalworking skills. In 1578, the London blacksmith Mark Scaliot produced a lock and chain that were attached to a flea.

The first recorded flea circus dates back to the early 1820s, when an Italian impresario named Louis Bertolotto advertised an "extraordinary exhibition of industrious fleas" on Regent Street, London. Bertolotto's flea shows included "four card-playing fleas, a flea orchestra (allegedly playing audibly), and a reenactment of Napoleon's defeat at Waterloo". Bertolotto's book The History of the Flea (c. 1833) also promoted flea circuses. Flea performances with military themes such as staged "sword fights" among fleas, were popular in the 19th century.

Some flea circuses persisted in very small venues in the United States as late as the 1960s. The flea circus at Belle Vue Zoological Gardens, Manchester, England, was still operating in 1970. In 2013, there was still at least one genuine flea circus still performing (at the annual Oktoberfest in Munich, Germany) and Svensons in the UK occasionally use real fleas, but most flea circuses are a sideline of magicians and clowns, and use electrical or mechanical effects instead of real fleas.

== Techniques ==
=== With real fleas ===
Fleas typically live only for a few months. They are observed to see if they have a predisposition for jumping or walking. Once sorted, they are harnessed by carefully wrapping a thin gold or copper wire around their neck. Once in the harness, the fleas usually stay in it for life. The harnesses are attached to the props and the strong legs of the flea allow them to move objects significantly larger than themselves. Jumping fleas are used for kicking small lightweight balls. They are carefully given a ball; when they try to jump away (which is not possible because of the harness), they shoot the ball instead. Running fleas can pull small carts and vehicles or rotate a Ferris wheel.

There are historical reports of fleas glued to the base of the flea circus enclosure. Miniature musical instruments were then glued to the flea performers and the enclosure was heated. The fleas fought to escape, giving the impression of playing instruments.

=== Without real fleas ===
Some flea circuses may appear to use real fleas, but in fact do not. A variety of electrical, magnetic, and mechanical devices have been used to augment exhibits. In some cases, these mechanisms are responsible for all of the "acts", with loose fleas in the exhibit maintaining the illusion. These circuses are known as "Humbug" flea circuses. Michael Bentine gave a mechanical flea circus a regular slot on his television show It's a Square World in the 1960s.

== Performers ==
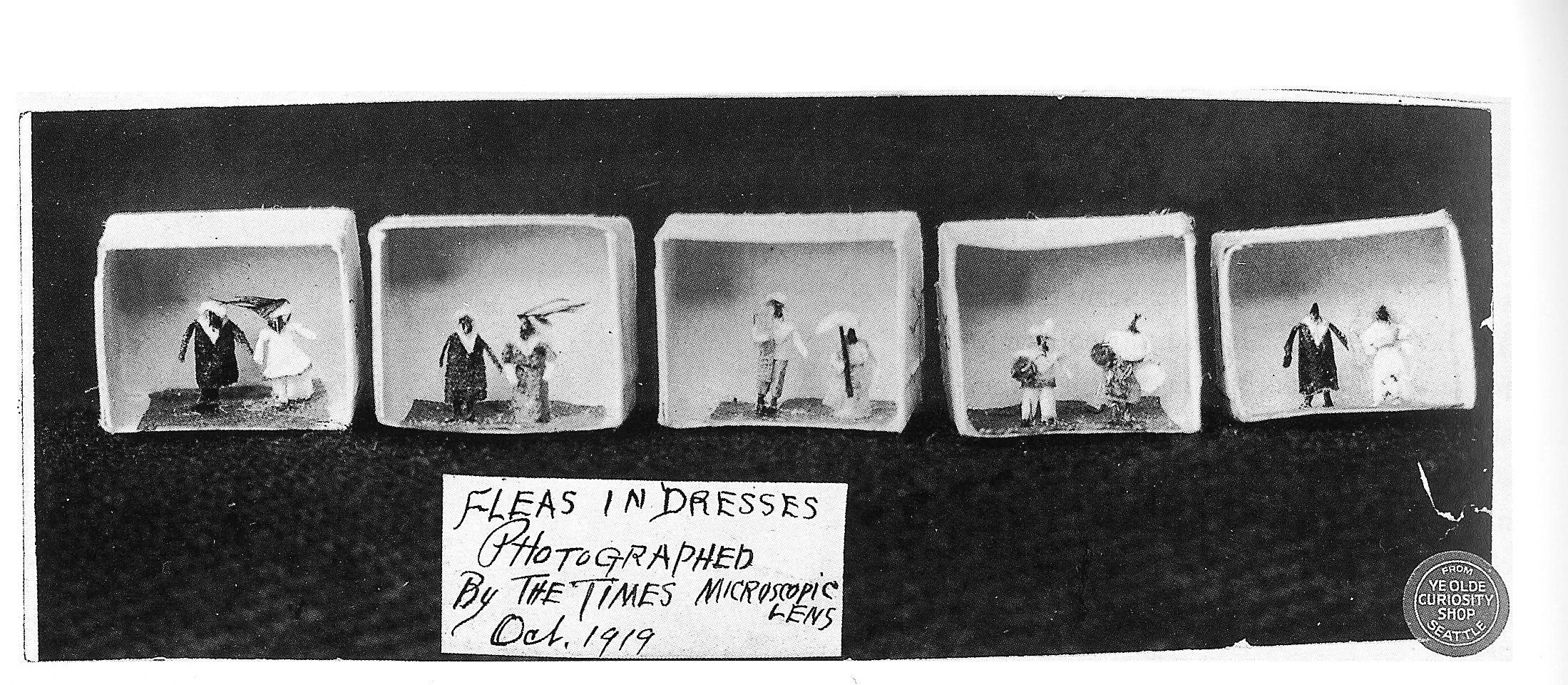
Fleas in dresses at Ye Olde Curiosity Shop, Seattle, WA

Current flea circuses:

- Professor A.G. Gertsacov's Acme Miniature Flea Circus has toured the United States and Canada since 1996.
- Svensons have performed in the UK since 1999, and have appeared in media and on television with Sir David Attenborough.
- Swami Bill's Flea Circus is featured at the Denver County Fair.
- Professor B's Flea Circus has performed in Northern California, USA in the late 2000s.
- The Flohcircus Birk at the Munich Oktoberfest in Germany.
- Professor Humbug's Flea Circus performs at Seattle's famous Pike Place Market.
- Captain Franko performs the flea circus across Europe from his base in France

In the 1990s, María Fernanda Cardoso toured the world with her installation art flea circus.

Professor Heckler's flea circus (in residence at Hubert's Dime Museum in Times Square, New York, until 1957) can be seen in the background of the films The Thief and Easy Rider. L. Bertolotto ran a famous flea circus in Regent Street, London.

== In popular culture ==
Flea circuses have featured in cartoons, films, television shows, music, and novels.
