= After Hours (1958 British TV series) =

1958 British TV series

- Genre: Sketch comedy
- Starring: Michael Bentine
- Country of origin: United Kingdom
- Original language: English
- No. of episodes: 28

Original release
- Release: 1958 – 1959

After Hours is a British television sketch show with musical and sporting guests, starring Michael Bentine, produced by ABC Weekend TV for ITV in 1958 and 1959. The show cast included Dick Emery, Clive Dunn, David Lodge, Joe Gibbons and Benny Lee. It was produced at Alpha Studios in Birmingham.

Some episodes were directed by Richard Lester with musical direction of Reg Owen.

All 28 episodes are believed to be lost.
