= Turkey Time =

Turkey Time may refer to:

- Turkey time (time in Turkey), the time zone of the Republic of Turkey
- Turkey Time (play), a 1931 British stage farce
- Turkey Time (1933 film), a British film farce
- Turkey Time (1970 film), a British television film by the BBC
- "Turkey Time", an episode of Rocko's Modern Life
