= Larry Stephens =

British scriptwriter (1923–1959)

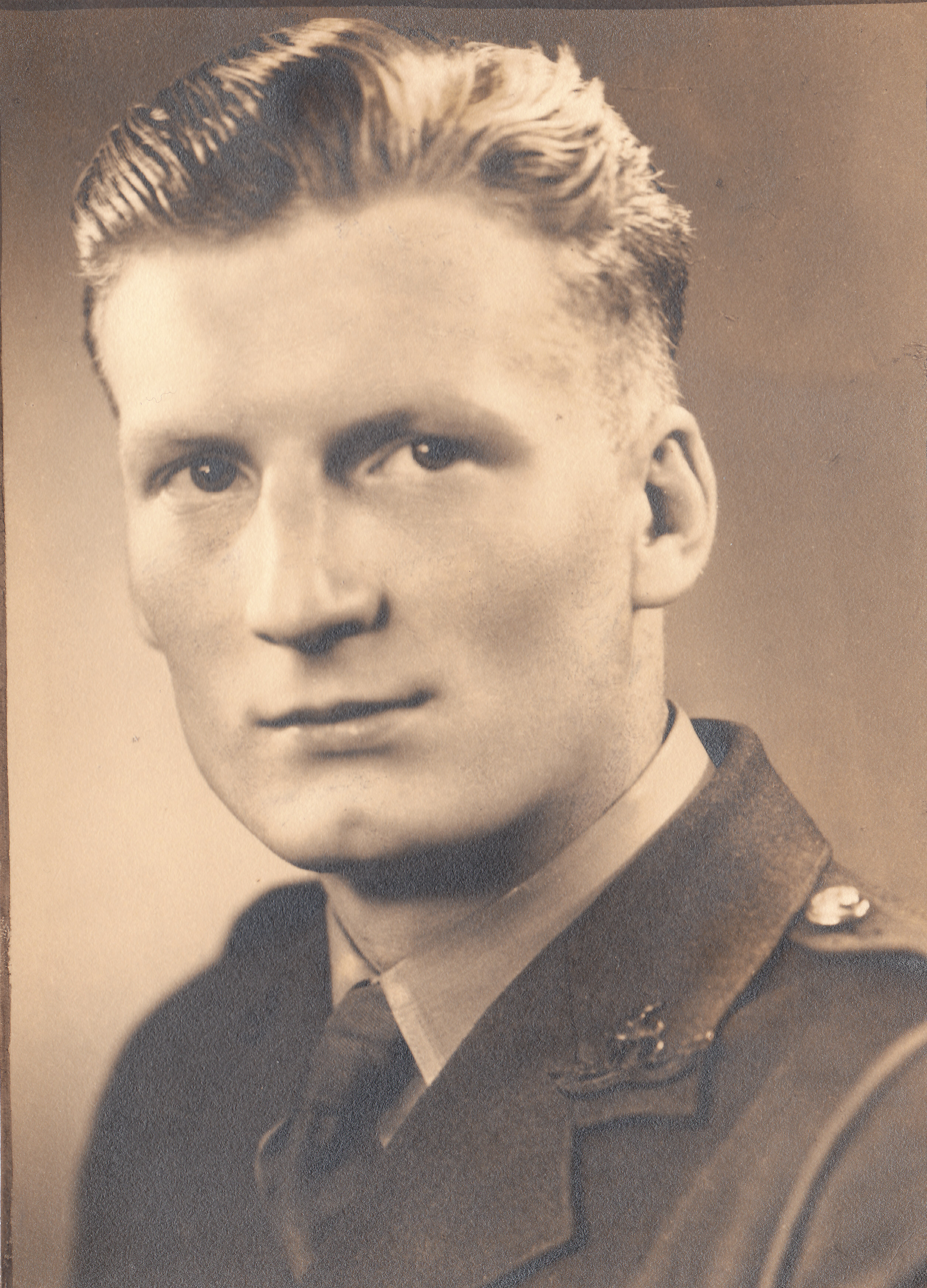
- Born: Lawrence Geoffrey Stephens; 16 July 1923; West Bromwich, Staffordshire, England
- Died: 26 January 1959 (aged 35); St Pancras, London
- Other name: .
- Occupation: Scriptwriter

Lawrence Geoffrey Stephens (16 July 1923 – 26 January 1959) was a BBC radio scriptwriter, best remembered for co-writing The Goon Show with Spike Milligan. Stephens was a regular writer of the show for the first two years, and then returned to The Goon Show to assist Milligan. From his association with Milligan, Stephens became involved with Associated London Scripts (ALS), and was said to have been "one of the most eye-catching characters, in the earliest days of the company...he played a significant cameo role in the first phase of success for ALS".

== Early life ==
Stephens was born in West Bromwich and moved to Quinton, Birmingham, when he was four. He attended Quinton Infant and Junior School then Birmingham Central Grammar School. Trained as an accountant, Stephens distinguished himself as a jazz pianist before the onset of World War II. Following service in the war, during which he served as a Commando captain, he returned to England, and began writing for British comedian Tony Hancock before Hancock became well known, and was Hancock's best man at the comedian's first wedding. In turn Hancock and his new wife Cicely were witnesses at Larry's marriage to Diana Forster a few days later. Both of the brides were models for the French fashion house Lanvin. Milligan once remarked that "Larry and Tony were like brothers".

== Career ==
In 1952, he developed a potential radio series for Hancock, which was designed to run for a full half-hour without musical breaks, then usual, called Vacant Lot. Although Spike Milligan, Peter Sellers and others were provisionally attached to the project, it was never recorded.

Elements of Vacant Lot were later re-written by Stephens and broadcast by the BBC as Welcome to Welkham, but with Brian Reece, instead of Hancock.

The original script for Vacant Lot re-emerged in 2015. After its rediscovery in the BBC Archives by Stephens' biographer Julie Warren, Vacant Lot was finally premiered in November 2017 – 65 years after its planned broadcast. Staged by Birmingham Comedy Festival as a live 'script-in-hand' performance with actor and impressionist James Hurn (as Tony Hancock) and Janice Connolly among the cast, Stephens' "great writing" was noted.

Stephens wrote for a number of popular shows, comedians and entertainers in the 1950s including Arthur Askey, Jon Pertwee and Dick Emery, Dickie Valentine, Kenneth Horne, Derek Roy, and Charles Hawtrey.

The radio shows he contributed to included Pertwee's Progress, Bumblethorpe (with Spike Milligan and Peter Ling), The Forces Show (with Jimmy Grafton), Arthur's Inn, Forces All-Star Bill (with Spike Milligan) and Star Bill (with Eric Sykes), and Bring On The Girls.

He wrote for Hancock again on The Tony Hancock Show (1956–57), which was screened on ITV by Associated-Rediffusion. Stephens also wrote for other popular television series too, such as The Army Game with Maurice Wiltshire, with whom he also co-wrote three Goon Show episodes (later, Wiltshire also rewrote an unused Stephens script for the show). Several of his radio scripts for The Goon Show were later adapted by Wiltshire for the TV puppet version, The Telegoons.

According to a BBC Radio 4 programme on Stephens' life, it was while working on the second season of The Goon Show that Stephens, doubling both as a key contributor and as Milligan's agent, began to drink so heavily it affected his work. Graham McCann (2006) states that Stephens' partnership with Milligan "foundered initially in the early 1950s – when he was drinking more than four bottles of rum and a couple of bottles of whisky each week". In February 1954, the BBC asserted that Stephens had violated the terms of his contract by failing to deliver scripts for The Goon Show on time, and that, thereafter, his work would only be considered on spec. Insulted, Stephens refused to have anything further to do with The Goon Show. Two years after the BBC cancelled his contract, Milligan managed to rehire Stephens for The Goon Show on the condition that Milligan, not the BBC, pay his salary. Per McCann (2006), Stephens was

Logical, perceptive and clever, he could capture Milligan's quick little ideas before they shot straight out of sight and then place them into a relatively coherent structure. His own keen visual sense – he would even illustrate his scripts with vivid little drawings of certain goons – helped sharpen some of Milligan's characterisations and stimulated his already rich and lively imagination. Milligan would throw out all kinds of hit-or-miss suggestions; Stephens would retrieve the ones most likely to work. Milligan would sometimes get distracted or paralysed by all of the comic possibilities; Stephens would often find the most effective way to get him back on track and moving forwards.

Stephens was probably at his busiest during 1955 and 1956, during which time, apart from co-writing The Goon Show, he also supplied the story and helped shape the screenplay for The Case of the Mukkinese Battle Horn (1956), and made countless last-minute re-writes of various comedians' scripts, innumerable gags for a wide range of variety shows and quite a few unofficial edits of troublesome television scripts. Stephens' heavy drinking had aggravated his high blood pressure, and he died on 26 January 1959; the official cause of death was a cerebral haemorrhage brought about by chronic hypertension.

== Death ==
Stephens' death has been a subject of surmise and conjecture. Many Goon Show fans believe that Stephens died while having dinner with Milligan. Another theory, advanced by Humphrey Carpenter in his biography of Milligan, states that he died in a car while going out to dinner with his wife, Diana, and Milligan.

McCann (2006) states that Stephens and his wife were on their way to dine out with Milligan. It was most likely that Stephens' death was the reason that The Goon Show episode, "Dishonoured – Again" (broadcast on 26 January 1959) was a remake of the show "Dishonoured" (broadcast on 14 December 1954).

A biography of Stephens has been written by his cousin Julie Warren. The book is entitled It's All In The Mind: The Life and Legacy of Larry Stephens.

== Filmography (as writer) ==
- The Super Secret Service (1953), film
- The Case of the Mukkinese Battle Horn (1956), film
- The Tony Hancock Show (1956–1957), TV series
- The Army Game (1957), TV series
- The Telegoons (1963–1964), TV series
