= Leon Thau =

British actor, TV producer and director (1926–2010)

Leon Thau (8 April 1926 in Jaffa, Palestine – 16 May 2010 in Dorset, United Kingdom) was a British actor, TV producer and director. He played the part of Frankie Wing in the 1960 London production of the musical Flower Drum Song. As an actor, he became known in the BBC TV comedy series It's a Square World (1960–64), and also appeared in Comedy Playhouse, The Gnomes of Dulwich, Z-Cars, Up Pompeii! and The Avengers. He had parts in the films The Magic Christian, Carry On Up the Khyber, The Great St Trinian's Train Robbery and The Sandwich Man.

Having worked with Michael Bentine in It's a Square World and The Sandwich Man, he produced and directed Michael Bentine's Potty Time for Thames Television.

As a director he was responsible for Prisoner Cell Block H, The Tomorrow People, and the children's series Rainbow and T-Bag, of both of which he was also a producer. He produced the situation comedy It's Awfully Bad for Your Eyes, Darling (1971).

== Filmography ==
- The Great St Trinian's Train Robbery (1966) - Pakistani Porter
- The Sandwich Man (1966) - Ram
- Casino Royale (1967) - Soldier Johnson (uncredited)
- Carry On Up the Khyber (1968) - Stinghi
- The Magic Christian (1969) - Engine Room Toff (uncredited)
