= Benny Lee =

British actor (1916–1995)

- Born: Ben Levy; 11 August 1916; Glasgow, Scotland
- Died: 9 December 1995 (aged 79); Portsmouth, Hampshire, England
- Other name: Ben Lee
- Occupations: Actor; singer

Ben Lee (born Ben Levy; 11 August 1916 – 9 December 1995) was a British actor and singer. He started his career in stage roles, subsequently developing a television and film career.

== Early life ==
Lee was born on 11 August 1916 to a Jewish family in The Gorbals, Glasgow, and originally named Ben Levy. He began his singing career as tenor in the school choir. Leaving school at 14, he became a tailor's apprentice, but soon left to join an all-purpose act, which sang, danced and performed acrobatics all around one of the main variety circuits of Britain.

Lee's acrobatic days lasted for only one evening on account of a nose injury. He was back in Glasgow, tailoring shirts and in his spare time playing drums for his own semi-professional dance-band. He also worked as a song-plugger for Essex Music Publishers. Wishing to return to the stage full-time, he joined the Princess's Theatre (now the Citizens Theatre) in the Gorbals), where he gained experience in straight acting. This led to his first BBC Radio audition in 1938.

== Music ==
From 1939 to 1941, Lee made several records with Lew Stone's dance band, one of the most notable in Europe. In 1941, Lee was heard singing by Johnny Claes, a trumpeter who had recently formed a swinging dance-band called the "Claepigeons". He liked the sound of Lee's voice, and signed him on as a vocalist. Soon Lee was singing and recording with many bands of the day, including that of Sid Phillips. He was frequently heard on the radio, and not only as a band singer. He played the part of Eddie Cantor in a radio version of the film Show Business (1944). His other radio series included Top Ten (1944) and Music from the Movies (1946).

Lee became sufficiently popular for him to be featured as a solo singer, rather than only fronting a band. As a crooner, he performed in over 2,000 broadcasts. In 1948, he was supported by the close-harmony group the Keynotes on "Rambling Rose". A 1948 review in Billboard for "You're in Kentucky" said, "Poor recording balance, bad song submerges the work of a fine English singer named Benny Lee."

The following year, he duetted with Joy Nichols, the star of Take It From Here, singing "On the 5.45". The Decca company came in with a contract and from 1950 he recorded such hits of the time as "Enjoy Yourself (It's Later Than You Think)", and "Down at the Ferry Boat Inn" with the Stargazers. Every type of pop song seemed to suit Lee, and he covered Guy Mitchell's hit "Pretty Little Black-Eyed Susie", and the Hank Williams hillbilly hit, "Your Cheatin' Heart". Lee enjoyed comedy numbers, and sang "Close the Door" with a chorus of young children on a special series made for Christmas 1955 entitled Benny Lee's Children's Party.

== Radio and television ==
Starting in January 1950, Lee appeared on Bernard Braden's radio shows, including Breakfast with Braden and Bedtime with Braden. Lee worked as both singer and comedian in these series.

Lee's television career began when he was cast as the host of the BBC's first ever series for teenagers. Cautiously subtitled "a fortnightly magazine for under 21s", Teleclub on its first outing introduced the pop star Teddy Johnson and radio's "Man in Black" with Valentine Dyall. This was in 1953, the same year that Lee played Mr Pegg, the myopic tailor to Terry-Thomas in the fifth series of How Do You View? His short-sighted measuring of the elegant "Master Terry" Denis Gifford described as a highspot.

The following year, Lee was cast as Arthur Honeybee in Friends and Neighbours, an early sitcom, with Peter Butterworth in the other lead playing George Bird. They recorded the programme's theme tune with their screen wives, Avril Angers and Janet Brown. It became a chart hit, not for the actors, but for Billy Cotton and his band. Lee was later regular support for Michael Bentine in his series It's a Square World (1960), along with Clive Dunn, Dick Emery, and Bruce Lacey, the madcap inventor. Much later, he portrayed Mr. Klein in the British sitcom, Are You Being Served? (1981) for four episodes.

== Films ==
Lee also appeared in the films Keep It Clean (1956), My Wife's Family (1956), The Girl Hunters (1963) and Mahler (1974), portraying Tarbottom, Arnold, Nat Drutman and Uncle Arnold respectively.

== Stage ==
Lee's stage appearances included the musical Two Gentlemen from Verona (1973) and Windy City (1983).

== Personal life and death ==
Lee married his wife, Ettie (née Berman), in Glasgow in 1941. He died in Portsmouth on 9 December 1995, at the age of 79. He was survived by his wife and two daughters.

== Select filmography ==
- Keep It Clean (1956)
- My Wife's Family (1956)
- Carry On Sergeant (1958; uncredited)
- Night of the Prowler (1962)
- The Girl Hunters (1963)
- A Stitch in Time (1963; uncredited)
- Mahler (1974)
