= The Super Secret Service =

1953 British film by Charles W. Green

- Directed by: Charles W. Green
- Screenplay by: Spike Milligan; Larry Stephens (credited as Larry Stevens)
- Produced by: John H. Robertson
- Starring: Peter Sellers; Graham Stark; Dick Emery; Anne Hayes; Raymond Francis; Frank Hawkins; Bryan Johnson
- Cinematography: Bunny Onions
- Edited by: Bob Rymer
- Production company: New Realm
- Distributed by: Butcher's Film Service
- Release date: 1953
- Running time: 23 minutes
- Country: United Kingdom
- Language: English

The Super Secret Service is a 1953 British black and white short comedy film directed by Charles W. Green and starring Peter Sellers, Graham Stark, Dick Emery and Ray Ellington and his Quartet. It was written by Spike Milligan and Larry Stephens (credited as "Larry Stevens").

The film was thought lost but recovered in 2025, when it was shown on the UK TV channel Talking Pictures TV.

== Plot ==
The Super Secret Service, MI-15, is hunting the mysterious foreign spy known as "Q".

== Cast ==
- Peter Sellers as Sir Walter Smood / Reuben J. Crouch
- Graham Stark as Carstairs
- Dick Emery as Pules
- Ray Ellington and his Quartet
- Raymond Francis as King of Flanubria
- Anne Levy as Miss Jones (credited as Anne Hayes)
- Frank Hawkins as Inspector Plungegroin
- Bryan Johnson as other characters
- Dickie Martyn as other characters

== Music ==
The Ray Ellington Quartet performs the song "Teddy Bears' Picnic" (Bratton/Kennedy).

== Reception ==
Kine Weekly wrote: "Crazy comedy burlesque on MI5. Its co-stars make good sport of bureaucracy and the picturesque villains of espionage and fiction, while Ray Ellington and his Quartet effectively punctuate the gags. Just the thing to tickle the industrial and provincial ninepennies. Lively British quota fill-up."
