= The Tony Hancock Show =

- Genre: Sketch show
- Starring: Tony Hancock; June Whitfield; John Vere; Clive Dunn; Dick Emery; Sam Kydd; Hattie Jacques; Eric Sykes; Sid James
- Country of origin: United Kingdom
- No. of series: 2
- No. of episodes: 12

Production
- Producer: Rediffusion London
- Running time: 30 minutes

Original release
- Network: ITV
- Release: 27 April 1956 – 25 January 1957

The Tony Hancock Show is a black-and-white British sketch show starring Tony Hancock that was broadcast on ITV by the franchise contractor Associated-Rediffusion for two series in 1956 and 1957, either side of the first television series of Hancock's Half Hour. Episodes were written by Eric Sykes, Larry Stephens, John Jose, or (for the few last episodes) Ray Galton and Alan Simpson. All the episodes were broadcast live.

== Cast ==
- Tony Hancock
- June Whitfield
- John Vere
- Clive Dunn
- Dick Emery
- Sam Kydd
- Hattie Jacques
- Eric Sykes
- Sid James

== Episodes ==
=== Series One (1956) ===
1. Episode One (27 April 1956)
2. Episode Two (4 May 1956)
3. Episode Three (11 May 1956)
4. Episode Four (18 May 1956)
5. Episode Five (25 May 1956)
6. Episode Six (1 June 1956)

=== Series Two (1956–57) ===
1. "Hancock - The Man of the Moment" (16 November 1956)
2. "Honneur Et Fidelité" (30 November 1956)
3. "The Further Adventures of Hancock" (14 December 1956)
4. "Weather or Not" (28 December 1956)
5. "Napoleon and Josephine" (11 January 1957)
6. "The Odd Job Man" (25 January 1957)

== Missing episodes ==
No episodes of the second series are thought to have survived.
