= Mike Osman =

British comedian (born 1959)

Mike Osman (born August 1959) is an English radio presenter, impressionist and entertainer.

He was born in Millbrook, Southampton, as the fourth of seven brothers. After leaving Millbrook Community Secondary School at 16, he was briefly an apprentice metal-worker before joining the Royal Navy as a marine engineer and mechanic.

He left the Navy in 1982 before joining the family roof tiling business. In his spare time, he started working in holiday camps and clubs as a semi-professional entertainer, before turning full-time in 1984.

== Entertainment career ==
In 1985, he joined ITV's Copy Cats as an impressionist, working alongside Gary Wilmot and Bobby Davro. Over the next few years he had roles in Gloria Hunniford's Sunday Sunday show, The Generation Game, Noel's House Party and Big Break, and also as a guest on Sky Sports. He also did summer tours with Jim Davidson and Russ Abbot.

In the early 1990s, Osman became an after-dinner speaker. At a boxing function at the Hilton Hotel in Park Lane, London in 1996 he was invited by Capital Radio programme controller Richard Park to do a Saturday football, music and comedy show on Capital Gold, called Home and Away with Mike and the Dugout Crew. Within a few weeks, he was offered the 10 am to 1 pm weekday show. After 2 years at Capital Gold they replaced Tony Blackburn on the prime breakfast show.

After six years, Osman quit the show in 2002 as the early morning starts were taking their toll on his health. Since then he has had a variety of short-term roles in television.

In 2005, he was one of the founding directors of Sound TV which was on air for only 10 months.

In 2006-07, he was employed by Southampton Football Club to warm up the crowd before their matches at St Mary's Stadium. From then until summer 2009 he presented a Sunday morning show on BBC Radio Solent.

In 2021, he launched Great British Radio with Kevin King, a radio station featuring presenters such as Linda Lusardi.

== Personal life ==
He is married to Jill and they have a daughter Katie.

== Discography ==
- Naughty But Nice, 2000
