= The Big Job (film) =

1965 British film by Gerald Thomas

- UK theatrical release poster
- Directed by: Gerald Thomas
- Written by: John Antrobus; Talbot Rothwell
- Produced by: Frank Bevis; Peter Rogers
- Starring: Sid James; Dick Emery; Joan Sims; Sylvia Syms; Jim Dale; Lance Percival
- Cinematography: Alan Hume
- Edited by: Rod Nelson-Keys
- Music by: Eric Rogers
- Production companies: Peter Rogers Productions; Anglo-Amalgamated
- Distributed by: Warner-Pathé Distributors
- Release date: 5 October 1965
- Running time: 85 minutes
- Country: United Kingdom
- Language: English

The Big Job is a 1965 British comedy film directed by Gerald Thomas and starring Sid James, Dick Emery, Joan Sims, Sylvia Syms, Jim Dale and Lance Percival. It was written by John Antrobus and Talbot Rothwell.

The Big Job shared its cast and production team with the Carry On films, but the film was not officially part of the Carry On series, despite being a typical Carry On format. The film was photographed in black and white, while the Carry On films from the mid-1960s were in colour.

== Plot ==
The story begins in London in 1950. A gang of robbers led by the self-proclaimed George "The Great" Brain rob a bank, stealing £50,000. They choose a hearse as a getaway vehicle (also dressing as undertakers) and are pursued into a rural area. George runs over fields before being caught by the police. However, before being caught George manages to conceal the money (which is in a briefcase) in the trunk of a hollow tree, before all three are arrested. The gang are sentenced to serve fifteen years in Wormwood Scrubs prison.

Upon their release in 1965, the gang go back to the spot where they had left the money, only to find it is now built over by a new town, and a housing estate has been built around the tree. They are dismayed that the tree now lies in the grounds of the local police station – but it is invitingly close to the boundary wall. George and his gang take up rooms in a nearby house rented from a widow and her daughter who also live there. They rent two double rooms on the first floor, one looking directly at the tree. They give the false names of Mr and Mrs Hook, Mr Line and Dr Sinker (allegedly an ornithologist). In order to provide a respectable front, George reluctantly agrees to marry his longtime girlfriend Myrtle Robbins who is not so enamoured about the idea of recovering the loot and wants George to settle down with her. They are all somewhat dismayed to find out over dinner that a third room is rented out to a policeman.

They steal a seaside observation telescope (requiring a penny every 5 minutes) to observe the tree. Their first plan simply steals a ladder to get over the wall but someone steals it back. Their second plan involves firing a harpoon with a rope attached, to hit the tree. Their third plan is to tunnel under but this requires Dr Sinker to swap rooms with the landlady and due to a misunderstanding he ends up marrying her, but this at least achieves access to the lower room.

The incompetent criminals fail in their numerous attempts to get over or under the wall, all the while trying to conceal their true activities from their landlady, her daughter and a local police constable who also stays there. Eventually, when the men have botched an attempt to tunnel into the grounds, with the police choir falling into the tunnel, the frustrated women hatch their own plot to gain the money, and succeed, only to find that the money has been shredded by mice nesting in the tree.

== Cast ==
- Sid James as George "The Great" Brain / Mr Hook
- Sylvia Syms as Myrtle Robbins / Mrs Hook
- Dick Emery as Frederick "Booky" Binns / Mr Line
- Joan Sims as Mildred Gamely
- Lance Percival as Timothy "Dipper" Day / Dr Sinker
- Jim Dale as Harold
- Deryck Guyler as Police Sergeant
- Edina Ronay as Sally Gamely
- Reginald Beckwith as Register Office official
- Michael Ward as undertaker
- Brian Rawlinson as Henry Blobbitt the tree surgeon
- David Horne as judge
- Frank Forsyth as bank cashier
- Frank Thornton as bank official
- Wanda Ventham as Dot Franklin

== Production ==
Peter Rogers had a script for what eventually would be The Big Job, but elected not to incorporate it into the Carry On series. Of the principal cast, only Sylvia Syms and Dick Emery did not feature in at least one Carry On. The film was principally shot at Pinewood Studios, with exteriors at Silver Hill, Chalfont St Giles (the bank), Fulmer and Bracknell (residential and town streets) and Iver Heath, Buckinghamshire (countryside).

== Critical reception ==
The Monthly Film Bulletin wrote: "A Carry On film in all but name, yet probably even funnier entertainment for those who like this brand of humour. For this is undeniably bright comedy of its kind, with amusing and sometimes quite inventive farcical situations, and deftly written dialogue. The cast give the impression of thoroughly enjoying themselves and play with appropriate relish."

Time Out wrote, "this 'unofficial' Carry On reproduces the familiar formula of its virtually institutionalised predecessors."

The Radio Times Guide to Films gave the film 3/5 stars, writing: "Sidney James is the leader of a gang of incompetent crooks who discover a police station has been built on the site where they stashed the loot from their last robbery. Partners-in-crime Sylvia Syms, Dick Emery and Lance Percival bungle his recovery plans with practised buffoonery, but they are often reduced to slapstick props. In contrast, Joan Sims's landlady, Jim Dale's goofy plod and Deryck Guyler's idle desk sergeant are much more fully developed comic creations."

== See also ==
- Blue Streak (1999)
- A Fire Has Been Arranged, a 1935 film with a similar plot
