= Michael Bentine =

British comedian (1922–1996)

Michael Bentine CBE
- Born: Michael James Bentin; 26 January 1922; Watford, Hertfordshire, England
- Died: 26 November 1996 (aged 74); London, England
- Resting place: Randall's Park Crematorium, Leatherhead, Surrey, England
- Education: Eton College
- Occupations: Comedian, actor
- Years active: 1940, 1946–1996
- Spouses: Marie A L Barradell (m. 1941; div. 1947) Clementina Theresa Gadesden Stuart McCall (m. 1949)

Michael Bentine (born Michael James Bentin; 26 January 1922 – 26 November 1996) was a British comedian, comic actor and founding member of the Goons.

== Biography ==
Bentine was born in Watford, Hertfordshire, to a Peruvian father, Adam Bentin, and a British mother, Florence Dawkins, and grew up in Folkestone, Kent. He was educated at Eton College. With the help of speech trainer, Harry Burgess, he learned to manage a stammer and subsequently developed an interest in amateur theatricals, along with the Tomlinson family, including the young David Tomlinson. He spoke fluent Spanish and French.

His father was an early aeronautical engineer for the Sopwith Aviation Company during and after World War I and invented a tension meter for setting the tension on aircraft rigging wires.

In World War II, Bentine volunteered for all services when the war broke out (the RAF was his first choice owing to the influence of his father's experience), but was initially rejected because of his father's nationality.

He started his acting career in 1940, in a touring company in Cardiff playing a juvenile lead in Sweet Lavender. He went on to join Robert Atkins' Shakespearean company in Regent's Park, London, until he was called up for service in the RAF. He was appearing in a Shakespearean play in doublet and hose in the open-air theatre in London's Hyde Park when two RAF Police NCOs marched on stage and arrested him for desertion. Unknown to him, an RAF conscription notice had been following him for a month as his company toured.

Once in the RAF he went through flying training. He was the penultimate man going through a medical line receiving inoculations for typhoid with the other flight candidates in his class (they were going to Canada to receive new aircraft) when the vaccine ran out. They refilled the bottle to inoculate him and the other man as well. By mistake they loaded a pure culture of typhoid. The other man died immediately, and Bentine was in a coma for six weeks. When he regained consciousness his eyesight was ruined, leaving him myopic for the rest of his life. Since he was no longer physically qualified for flying, he was transferred to RAF Intelligence and seconded to MI9, a unit that was dedicated to supporting resistance movements and helping prisoners escape. His immediate superior was the Colditz escapee Airey Neave.

At the end of the war, he took part in the liberation of Bergen-Belsen concentration camp. He said about this experience:

Millions of words have been written about these horror camps, many of them by inmates of those unbelievable places. I've tried, without success, to describe it from my own point of view, but the words won't come. To me Belsen was the ultimate blasphemy. (The Reluctant Jester, Chapter 17.)

== Comedy career ==
After the war Bentine decided to become a comedian and worked in the Windmill Theatre where he met Harry Secombe. He specialised in off-the-wall humour, often involving cartoons and other types of animation. His acts included giving lectures in an invented language called Slobodian, "Imaginative Young Man with a Walking Stick" and "The Chairback", with a broken chairback having a number of uses from comb to machine gun and taking on a demoniacal life of its own. Peter Sellers told him this was the inspiration for the prosthetic arm routine in Dr Strangelove. This act led to his engagement by Val Parnell to appear in the Starlight Roof revues starring Vic Oliver, where he met and married his second wife Clementina, with whom he had four children. Also on the bill were Fred Emney and a young Julie Andrews.

Bentine co-created The Goon Show radio show with Spike Milligan, Peter Sellers and Harry Secombe, but appeared in only the first 38 shows on the BBC Home Service from 1951 to 1952. The first of these shows were actually called Those Crazy People and subtitled "The Junior Crazy Gang"; the term "Goon" was used as the headline of a review of Bentine's act by Picture Post dated 5 November 1948. Only one of this first series (and very few of the following three in which he did not appear) has survived, the rest of the original disc recordings having apparently been destroyed or discarded as no longer usable, so there is almost no record of his work as a radio "Goon". He also appeared in the 1952 Goon Show film Down Among the Z Men.

In 1951 Bentine was invited to the United States to appear on The Ed Sullivan Show. On his return he parted amicably from his partners and continued touring in variety, remaining close to Secombe and Sellers for the rest of his life. In 1972, Secombe and Sellers told Michael Parkinson that Bentine was "always calling everyone a genius" and, since he was the only one of the four with a "proper education", they always believed him.

His first appearances on television were as presenter on a 13-part children's series featuring remote controlled puppets, The Bumblies, which he also devised, designed and wrote. These were three small creatures from outer space who slept on "Professor Bentine's" ceiling and who had come to Earth to learn the ways of Earthling children. Angelo de Calferta modelled the puppets from Bentine's designs and Richard Dendy moulded them in latex rubber. He sold the series to the BBC for less than they had cost to make. He then spent two years touring in Australia (1954–55).

On his return to Britain in 1954, he worked as a scriptwriter for Peter Sellers and then on 39 episodes of his own radio show Round the Bend in 30 Minutes, which has also been wiped from the BBC archive. He then teamed up with Dick Lester to devise a series of six TV programmes Before Midnight for ABC Weekend TV in Birmingham in 1958. This led to a 13-programme series called After Hours in which he appeared alongside Dick Emery, Clive Dunn, David Lodge, Joe Gibbons and Benny Lee. The show featured the "olde English sport of drats, later known as nurdling". Some of the sketches were adapted into a stage revue at the Cambridge Theatre, Don't Shoot, We're English. He also appeared in the film comedy Raising a Riot, starring Kenneth More, which featured his five-year-old daughter "Fusty". He joked that she got better billing.

From 1960 to 1964, he had a television series, It's a Square World, which won a BAFTA award in 1962 and Grand Prix de la Presse at Montreux in 1963. A prominent feature of the series was the imaginary flea circus where plays were enacted on tiny sets using nothing but special effects to show the movement of things too small to see and sounds with Bentine's commentary. One, titled The Beast of the Black Bog Tarn, was set in a (miniature) haunted house.

He was the subject of This Is Your Life in April 1963 when he was surprised by Eamonn Andrews at the BBC Television Theatre.

He co wrote and starred in a film The Sandwich Man (1966) but it was not a success.

In 1969–70 he was presenter of The Golden Silents on BBC TV, which attempted authentic showings of silent films, without the commentaries with which they were usually shown on television before then.

From 1974 to 1980 he wrote, designed, narrated and presented the children's television programme Michael Bentine's Potty Time and made one-off comedy specials.

From January to May 1984 Bentine put out 11 half-hour episodes, in two series, of The Michael Bentine Show on Radio 4. These have subsequently been repeated, several times, on the BBC's archive radio station BBC7 (now BBC Radio 4 Extra).

He was the writer of 16 best-selling novels, comedies and non-fiction books. Four of his books, The Long Banana Skin (1975), The Door Marked Summer (1981), Doors of the Mind and The Reluctant Jester (1992) are autobiographical.

=== Other interests ===
In 1968, travelling on the British Hovercraft Corporation (BHC) SR.N6, GH–2012, Bentine took part in the first hovercraft expedition up the River Amazon.

In the 1995 New Year Honours, Bentine received a CBE from Queen Elizabeth II "for services to entertainment". In 1971, Bentine received the Order of Merit of Peru following his fund-raising work for the 1970 Great Peruvian earthquake.

Bentine was a crack pistol shot and helped to start the idea of a counter-terrorist wing within 22 SAS Regiment. In doing so, he became the first non-SAS person to fire a gun inside the close-quarters battle training house at Hereford.

His interests included parapsychology. This was as a result of his and his family's extensive research into the paranormal, which resulted in his writing The Door Marked Summer and Doors of the Mind. He was, for the final years of his life, president of the Association for the Scientific Study of Anomalous Phenomena.

On 14 December 1977, he appeared with Arthur C. Clarke on Patrick Moore's BBC The Sky at Night programme.

== Family and health ==
Bentine was married twice. With his first wife Marie Barradell, married 1941–1947, he had a daughter, Elaine (1942–1983).

In 1949, he married his second wife, Clementina Stuart, a Royal Ballet dancer. They had four children.

His two eldest daughters died from cancer in the 1980s. His elder son was killed with a pilot friend when a Piper PA-18 Super Cub crashed into a hillside at Ditcham Park Woods near Petersfield, Hampshire, on 28 August 1971. Their bodies and the aircraft were not found until October 1971. An 11-month Air Accidents Investigation Branch inquiry found that the aircraft went into clouds when taking action to avoid power cables while flying low in poor visibility and went out of control. Bentine's subsequent investigation into regulations governing private airfields resulted in his writing a report for Special Branch into the use of personal aircraft in smuggling operations. He fictionalised much of the material in his novel Lords of the Levels.

From 1975 until his death in 1996, he and his wife spent their winters at a second home in Palm Springs, California, US.

Shortly before his death from prostate cancer at the age of 74, he was visited in hospital by the future King Charles III.

== Programmes ==
Some of the programmes Bentine appeared in were:

- The Goon Show (1951–1952) as himself
- Goonreel (1952, TV movie)
- The Bumblies (1954) as Prof. Michael Bentine / voices of the Bumblies
- Yes, It's the Cathode-Ray Tube Show! (1957) (voice)
- After Hours (1958–1959)
- Round the Bend in Thirty Minutes (1959)
- It's a Square World (1960–1964)
- All Square (1966)
- The Golden Silents (1969–1970)
- Michael Bentine's Potty Time (1972) as Prof. Bentine / voices of Pottys
- The Sky at Night (1977–1979, Documentary) as himself
- Creek Crawling (aka Creek Crawler Extraordinary) (1980)
- The Michael Bentine Show (1984, BBC Radio 2)
- Terry Teo (1985) as Ray Vegas
- The Great Bong (1993)

== Film ==
- Cookery Nook (1951, Short) as the friend
- London Entertains (1951, documentary) as himself
- Down Among the Z Men (aka The Goon Movie) (1952) as Prof. Osrick Purehart
- Forces' Sweetheart (1953) as Flt-Lieut. John Robinson R.A.F.
- Raising a Riot (1955) as the professor
- John and Julie (1955) as paper tearing entertainer (uncredited)
- I Only Arsked! (1958) as Fred
- The Do-It-Yourself Cartoon Kit (1961, short) (voice)
- We Joined the Navy (1962) as psychologist (uncredited)
- The Sandwich Man (1966) as the Sandwich Man
- Bachelor of Arts (1971, short) as Miklos Durti
- Rentadick (1972) as Hussein

== Books ==
=== Nonfiction ===
- Doors of The Mind – Granada – 1984 – ISBN 0-246-11845-8
- The Shy Person's Guide To Life – Grafton – 1984 – ISBN 0-586-06167-3
- Open Your Mind: The Quest for Creative Thinking – Bantam Press – 1990 – ISBN 0-593-01538-X

==== Autobiographical ====
- The Long Banana Skin – New English Library – 1976 – ISBN 0-450-02882-8
- The Door Marked Summer – Granada – 1981 – ISBN 0-246-11405-3
- The Reluctant Jester – Bantam Press – 1992 – ISBN 0-593-02042-1

=== Fiction and humour ===
- Square Games (1966) Wolfe SBN 072340080-6
- The Potty Treasure Island (1973)
- The Potty Khyber Pass (1974)
- The Best of Bentine (1984) Panther
- The Potty Encyclopedia (1985)
- Madame's Girls and other stories (1980)
- Smith & Son Removers – Corgi – 1981 – ISBN 0-552-12074-X
- Lords of The Levels – Grafton – 1986 – ISBN 0-586-06643-8
- The Condor and The Cross sub-title An Adventure Novel of the Conquistadors – Bantam Press – 1987 – ISBN 0-593-01265-8
- Templar – Bantam Press – 1988 – ISBN 0-593-01339-5

==== With John Ennis ====
- Michael Bentine's Book of Square Holidays M. Bentine & J. Ennis (1968) Wolfe SBN 72340019-9
- Fifty Years on the Streets Michael Bentine & John Ennis (1964) New English Library, A Four Square Book

== Sources ==
- AAIB (1972). Piper PA 19, G-AYPN. Report on the accident at Ditcham Woods, near Petersfield, Hampshire, on 28 August 1971. Report No: 13/1972 (Report). Department of Trade and Industry.
- Glasgow Herald (1 November 1971). "Crashed plane found in forest". The Herald. p. 17.
