= The Case of the Mukkinese Battle-Horn =

1956 British film by Joseph Sterling

- Cover of DVD release
- Directed by: Joseph Sterling
- Written by: Larry Stephens (original story and screenplay); Harry Booth (screenplay); Jon Penington (screenplay); Peter Sellers (additional material); Spike Milligan (additional material)
- Produced by: Harry Booth; Michael Deeley; Jon Penington
- Starring: Peter Sellers; Spike Milligan; Dick Emery
- Cinematography: Gerald Gibbs
- Music by: Edwin Astley
- Distributed by: Archway Film Distributors
- Release date: 1956
- Running time: 27 minutes
- Country: United Kingdom
- Language: English
- Budget: £4,500
- Box office: £45,000

The Case of the Mukkinese Battle-Horn (also known as Gone Goon) is a 1956 British short comedy second feature ('B') film directed by Joseph Sterling and starring Peter Sellers, Spike Milligan and Dick Emery. It was written by Harry Booth, Jon Penington and regular Goon show co-writer Larry Stephens, from a story by Stephens, with additional material by Sellers and Milligan.

It was made in November 1955 and released in 1956.

== Plot ==
Supposedly filmed in "Schizophrenoscope" ("the New Split-Screen"), it concerns Superintendent Quilt of Scotland Yard's attempts to retrieve a "Mukkinese Battle-Horn'" stolen from a London museum. Along the way he meets characters not dissimilar to Eccles, Henry Crun and Minnie Bannister from The Goon Show.

== Cast ==
- Peter Sellers as Inspector Quilt/Henry Crun/Sid Crimp et al.
- Spike Milligan as Sergeant Brown/Eccles/Minnie et al.
- Dick Emery as Nodule/Maurice Ponk
- Doug Robinson as waiter
- Pamela Thomas
- Bill Hepper
- Wally Thomas
- Gordon Phillott

== Production ==
The budget of £4,500 was raised from Archway Film Distributors (£1,500); Peter Weingreen, who worked with Michael Deeley and Harry Booth on The Adventures of Robin Hood (£1,500); and Joseph Sterling, who wanted to direct (£1,500). Peter Sellers was paid £900.

Emery replaced Harry Secombe, who was too expensive for the film's low budget.

The titular battle horn prop was based on a serpent.

== Release ==
The film was unable to secure a release in the US but screened widely as a supporting short in British cinemas. Michael Deeley says it remains the most profitable film he was ever associated with, returning its cost ten times over.

== Critical reception ==
Kine Weekly wrote: "Its players work hard, but its humour, pretty crude, is mainly addressed to the lowbrows."

The New York Times wrote: "It is a good thing Mr. Sellers and his helpers didn't try to stretch it for longer than a half hour. But within that time and with reservations ... it makes a lively little lark."

The Radio Times Guide to Films gave the film 3/5 stars, writing: "Dick Emery stands in for Harry Secombe in this pseudo-Goons picture. The theft of the eponymous instrument is of virtually no significance other than to give Peter Sellers the opportunity to play three characters. Spike Milligan also gets to reprise his beloved character, Eccles. The opening "Crime Does Not Pay" pastiche and the door-knocking sequence are the highlights."
