= María Fernanda Cardoso =

Colombian contemporary artist (born 1963)

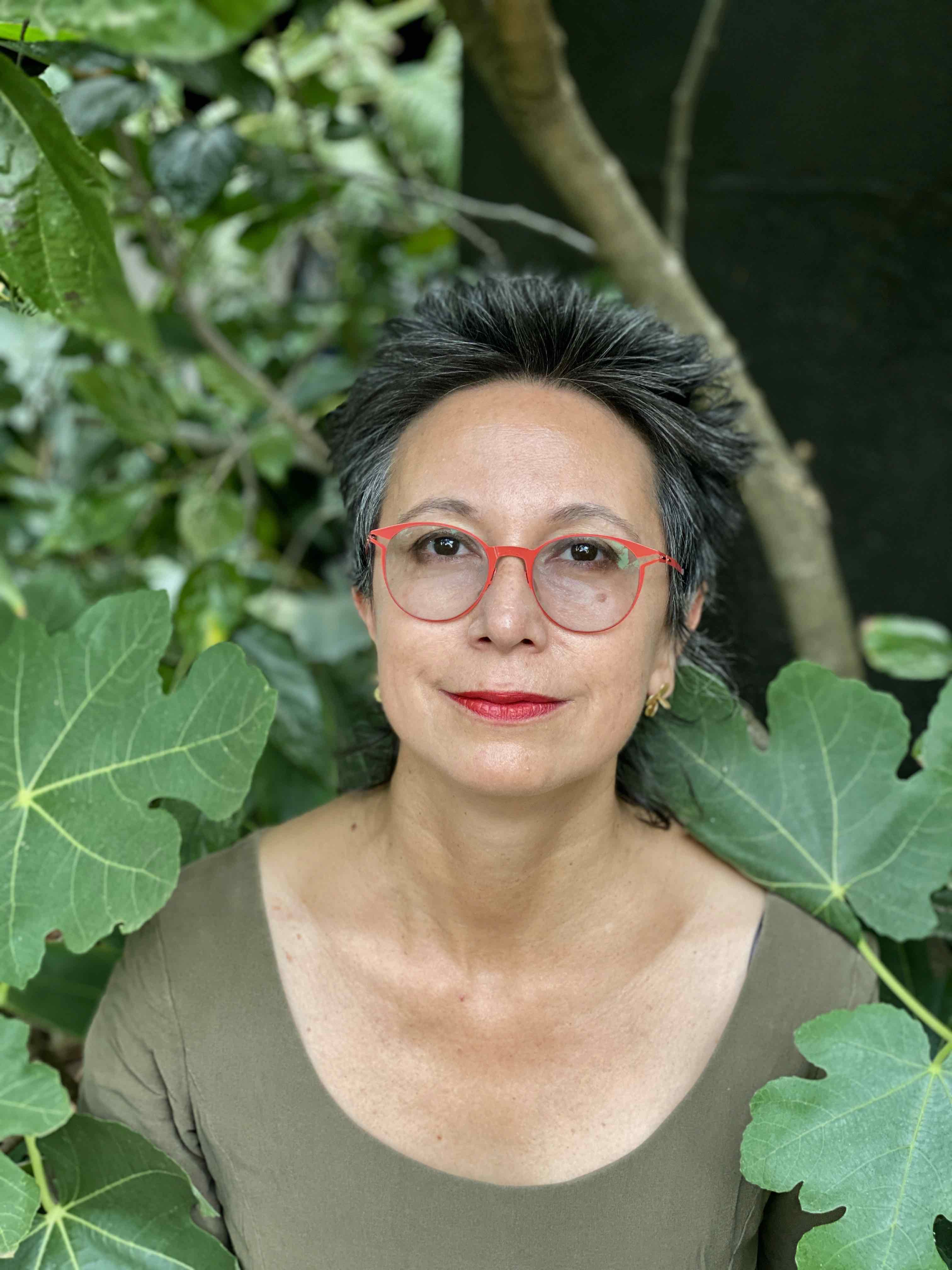
- Cardoso's portrait by photographer Ross Rudesch Harley
- Born: 2 February 1963; Bogotá, Colombia
- Education: University of Sydney; Yale University; Universidad de los Andes
- Known for: Painting, Sculpture, Video art, Photography, Contemporary art
- Notable work: Cardoso Flea Circus, The Art of Disappearance, Preserved animals, Woven Water, Cemeteries, Museum of Copulatory Organs, Corn
- Spouse: Ross Rudesch Harley

María Fernanda Cardoso (born 1963) is a Colombian artist based in Australia. Her contemporary art references many types of ready-made material, including plastic, trash, plants, dried and living animals, bones and styrofoam. One of her most famous art installations was a flea circus that featured live cat fleas. The circus toured internationally at venues including the Sydney Opera House, the Centre Pompidou, the Arts Festival Atlanta, the Fabric Workshop and Museum (Philadelphia), and the San Francisco Exploratorium. This work, including a series of videos made in collaboration with Ross Rudesch Harley, is now part of Tate Modern's permanent collection.

Her works have been featured in several museums internationally in Europe, the Americas, and Australia, and have won several awards. She resides in Sydney.

== Biography ==
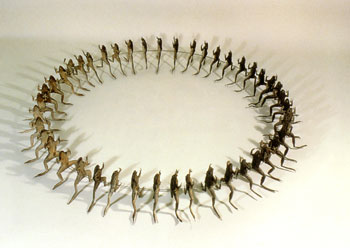
"Dancing Frogs" (1990), made with dried frogs

In the early 1980s, Cardoso studied architecture and the visual arts at the University of the Andes in Bogotá. In 1990, she graduated with a Master of Fine Arts in Sculpture and Installation at Yale University.

Cardoso moved to Sydney, Australia, in 1997.

In 2000, the Museum of Modern Art in New York commissioned her to create a major installation for their millennium show, "Modern Starts". Here she installed 36,000 plastic lilies in a 125-foot long wall, which subsequently toured museums throughout the United States. In 2003, she represented Colombia at the Venice Biennale, exhibiting a large installation of starfish woven together into a submarine landscape called "Woven Water".

She had a solo exhibition in 2011 at Melbourne's Arc One gallery centered on the genitalia of male insects entitled "It's not size that matters, it is shape". The following year, she created "The Museum of Copulatory Organs" for her doctoral project. She was awarded her PhD from the University of Sydney linked to the Sydney College of the Arts in 2012.

Her mother is the architect Eugenia Mantilla de Cardoso and her sister is the director Patricia Cardoso.

== Cardoso Flea Circus ==
Cardoso created a flea circus that included the following "performers" and "stuntfleas": Harry Fleadini, an escape artist; Samson and Delilah, fleas that lifted cotton ball weights; Teeny and Tiny, tightrope walkers; Pipita and Pepon, a flea couple who pushed luminescent balls on a wire; and Brutus, who pulled a locomotive. Cardoso guided the behavior of the fleas by reward; when they behaved as desired, she let them feed directly on her blood. As Cardoso explained, "It's one of the hardest thing in life to train fleas, it took six years and it requires a lot of patience, no one knew how to train fleas anymore".

The first public performance of the Cardoso Flea Circus took place in October 1996 at San Francisco's Exploratorium. Because of the size of the fleas, she collaborated with Ross Rudesch Harley to add audio and video for a larger projection. It was recently acquired by the Tate Modern.

== Other works ==
"Cementerio—Vertical Garden" is a series of unique installation pieces made of artificial flowers placed as if growing horizontally from the wall over funerary stones outlined in pencil. The pieces, made with a group of plastic flowers and pencil, were exhibited and developed by the artist from 1990 to 1999. These kinds of installation are currently in the most important art collections worldwide such as Museum of Modern Art (MoMA) in New York, Colección Patricia Phelps de Cisneros in Caracas, Colección Diane and Bruce Halle in Arizona, Colección D.O.P. in Madrid, Perez Art Museum in Miami, San Francisco Museum of Modern Art, California, among others.

"Dancing Frogs" is an assembly of dried dead frogs connected by a circular wire. The frogs appear to be spinning in circles as if in a ritual dance. The piece explicitly references the representations and indigenous symbols of the Muisca, as the circle and the frogs were part of this Pre-Hispanic symbolism.
