= The Sandwich Man (1966 film) =

British comedy by Robert Hartford-Davis

- Theatrical release poster
- Directed by: Robert Hartford-Davis
- Written by: Michael Bentine; Robert Hartford-Davis
- Produced by: Peter Newbrook
- Starring: Michael Bentine; Dora Bryan; Harry H. Corbett
- Cinematography: Peter Newbrook
- Edited by: Peter Taylor
- Music by: Mike Vickers
- Production company: Titan International Pictures
- Distributed by: Rank Film Distributors
- Release date: July 1966
- Running time: 95 minutes
- Country: United Kingdom
- Language: English
- Budget: £214,452 or £189,334

The Sandwich Man is a 1966 British comedy film directed by Robert Hartford-Davis starring Michael Bentine, with support from a cast of British character actors including Dora Bryan, Harry H. Corbett, Bernard Cribbins, Diana Dors, Norman Wisdom, Terry-Thomas and Ian Hendry. It was written by Hartford-Davis and Bentine. The movie was an unsuccessful attempt to turn Bentine into a film star.

== Plot synopsis ==
Horace Quilby is a mild-mannered widower living in the Port of London. His job as a sandwich-board man requires him to wander around London wearing immaculate morning dress (top hat and tails) carrying advertisements. However, his real interest in life is pigeon racing – especially his bird Esmerelda, which is racing from Bordeaux to London – so he keeps calling at places on his route to see if there is any news.

During the course of one day, Quilby encounters a host of eccentric characters and becomes involved in a series of capers. He helps reunite a young model Sue with her errant boyfriend Steven.

Quilby's homing pigeon Esmerelda wins the race, and the whole of his neighbourhood joins in the celebrations.

== Cast ==
- Michael Bentine as Horace Quilby / Gungadin, jazz club owner
- Dora Bryan as Mrs. DeVere
- Harry H. Corbett as stage-door keeper
- Bernard Cribbins as Harold, photographer
- Diana Dors as first Billingsgate lady
- Ian Hendry as policeman on motorbike
- Stanley Holloway as park gardener
- Wilfrid Hyde-White as Lord Uffingham
- Michael Medwin as sewer man
- Ron Moody as rowing coach
- Anna Quayle as second Billingsgate lady
- Terry-Thomas as scoutmaster
- Norman Wisdom as boxing vicar
- Donald Wolfit as car salesman
- Suzy Kendall as Sue
- Alfie Bass as model yachtsman
- Fred Emney as Sir Mervyn Moleskin
- Sydney Tafler as first fish porter
- Frank Finlay as second fish porter
- Warren Mitchell as Gypsy Sid
- David Buck as Steven Mansfield
- Tracey Crisp as girl in the black plastic mac
- Earl Cameron as bus conductor
- Roger Delgado as Abdul, the carpet seller
- Leon Thau as Ram
- Hugh Futcher as Gogi
- Ronnie Stevens as drunk
- Peter Jones as escapologist (Manfred the Magnificent)
- John Le Mesurier as senior sandwich man
- Max Bacon as chef
- John Junkin as chauffeur
- Gerald Campion as sandwich man in suit of armour
- Burt Kwouk as ice cream man
- David Lodge as Charlie
- Aubrey Morris as Cedric (The Great)
- Peter Arne as gentleman in Rolls-Royce
- Jeremy Lloyd as guardsman
- Michael Trubshawe as guardsman
- Ewen Solon as blind man
- Michael John Chaplin as pavement artist
- Brian Cant as newspaper photographer at street party
- Nosher Powell as Nosher, bus driver
- Anna Karen as lady with dog
- Joe Gibbons as man on mowing machine
- Deborah Bishop as woman taking an unnatural interest in the size of Frank Finlay's sandwich

== Production ==
In March 1966 Rank announced it would make nine films with a total cost of £7.5 million of which it would provide £4 million. Two films were financed by Rank completely, a Norman Wisdom movie and a "doctor" comedy (Doctor on Toast which became Doctor in Trouble). The others were The Quiller Memorandum, Deadlier than the Male, Maroc Seven, Red Hot Ferrari (never made), The Fifth Coin (never made), The Battle of Britain and The Long Duel.

The film was the second in a short-lived series of co-productions between the National Film Finance Corporation and Rank. (The first had been Passage of Love which became I Was Happy Here.) It was announced in September 1965.

== Critical reception ==
The Sandwich Man's release was met with negative reaction from critics, and it did not perform well commercially.

The Monthly Film Bulletin wrote: "Robert Hartford-Davis' direction displays an astonishing lack of imagination – hackneyed cutting, elementary slips in continuity (blue sky giving way to grey in consecutive shots), and virtually every scene being introduced by having the camera tilt down familiar London landmarks. What little narrative there is stops dead at regular intervals to allow what amounts to a veritable Who's Who of British character actors to perform while Michael Bentine stands sadly watching on the sidelines. Up to the minute, trend-setting, cosmopolitan London is here revealed in a series of British comedy clichés (excitable Indians, chirpy cockney housewives, absentminded aristocrats) and in an absurdly pretentious slow motion wrestling match behind the end titles. The Sandwich Man is the second film to be made under the auspices of the N.F.F.C./Rank scheme to aid independent producers: one can only hope that the schemes future films will be better than this."

Variety said: "Spotty pic. ... Gags and situations do not add up to useful comedy."

Kine Weekly called the film a "hilarious romp in colour through London."

Leslie Halliwell wrote: "Spurned when it was first released, this comedy variety show, mostly in mime, can now be seen of a kind popularised by TV, and may have been simply ahead of its time. It certainly seems funnier than it did."

The Radio Times Guide to Films gave the film 2/5 stars, writing: "Known as the Goon that got away, and as the genius behind Potty Time, Michael Bentine was yet another British comedian who failed to repeat his TV and/or radio success on the big screen. This virtually silent comedy was politely considered "ahead of its time" on its release, but, over 30 years later, this euphemism for "not very good" still applies. The cast is all-star, but the film's few pleasures come from Bentine's often inspired mime as he wanders the streets of London with his sandwich board."
