= Turkey Time (1970 film) =

1970 English television film

- Based on: Turkey Time by Ben Travers
- Screenplay by: Ben Travers
- Starring: Richard Briers; Arthur Lowe
- Country of origin: England
- Original language: English

Production
- Producer: Eric Fawcett

Original release
- Network: BBC
- Release: 3 October 1970

Turkey Time is a 1970 British television production by the BBC.

== Cast ==
- Richard Briers as David Winterton
- Arthur Lowe as Edwin Stoatt
- Eunice Gayson as Louise Stoatt
- Mollie Sugden as Mrs. Pike
- Elizabeth Knight as Rose Adair
- Gladys Henson as Mrs. Gather
- Terence Alexander as Max Wheeler
- Toke Townley as Luke Meate
- Margot Field as Ernestine Stoatt
- Betty Hare as Mrs. Ratchett
- Derek Sydney as Warwick Westbourne
- Keith Ashley as Man in the shelter
- Alec Ross as PC Tidball

== Adaptation ==
The BBC's production was based on the play Turkey Time, one of the Aldwych farces, by Ben Travers.

== Release ==
First transmitted by the BBC on 3 October 1970, Turkey Time was made in colour on 2" videotape, but survives only as a monochrome 16mm film print.
