= It's Awfully Bad for Your Eyes, Darling =

1971 British television series

- Genre: Sitcom
- Written by: Jilly Cooper; Christopher Bond
- Directed by: Leon Thau
- Country of origin: United Kingdom
- Original language: English
- No. of series: 1
- No. of episodes: 7

Production
- Producer: Leon Thau
- Running time: 30 minutes

Original release
- Network: BBC1
- Release: 15 April – 30 December 1971

It's Awfully Bad for Your Eyes, Darling is a BBC television sitcom which ran for a single series of six episodes in November–December 1971, after a pilot in April 1971 shown in Comedy Playhouse.

Written by Jilly Cooper and Christopher Bond, it was about four posh young women sharing a flat in London. They were played by Jane Carr ("Pudding"), Joanna Lumley ("Samantha"), Elizabeth Knight ("Clover") and Jennifer Croxton ("Virginia"); Jeremy Lloyd played a boyfriend. The series producer was Leon Thau.

Only the first episode of the series ("A New Lease") exists in the archives; the pilot and the rest of the series are missing.
