= Tension meter =

Device for quantifying the strength of tension of a string or wire

A tension meter is a device used to measure tension in wires, cables, textiles, Mechanical belts and more. Meters commonly use a 3 roller system where the material travels through the rollers causing deflection in the center roller that is connected to an analog indicator or load cell on digital models. Single roll tension sensors and sonic tension meters are other types of tension meters. Tension may also be inferred from the frequency of vibration of the material under stress by solving the "Vibrating String Equation". Tension meters are available as handheld devices or as equipment for fixed installations. These are basically necessary to build up a tension-controlled closed loop.
