= Sound TV =

History
- Launched: 26 February 2005
- Closed: Autumn 2005
- Former names: The Great British Television Channel (pre-launch)

Sound TV was a free-to-air television channel following the tradition of the variety show, which has not been popular in Britain since the 1980s. It aspired to give television exposure to acts (young and old) unable to acquire airtime on other channels.

The managing director of the channel was comedian and folk singer Richard Digance. Chris Tarrant and Mike Osman were executives and associates and Cornish comedian Jethro was a director.

The channel was managed by Information TV, a factual channel which broadcast on the same frequency between midnight and 16:00. Sound TV's launch was delayed several times under its working title of The Great British Television Channel.

== Opening night ==
19:00 Mike Osman, Richard Digance and Jethro discussed the vision for the new channel, such as an opportunity to give television exposure and breaks to new talent. Digance commented that they could not financially compete with ITV, and therefore could not afford lavish productions such as Live at Her Majesty's. They contrasted themselves to other television executives: if the turn acts didn't turn up, they said, then they themselves could do the gig.
19:30 Golden Moments
20:00 The New Variety Show — From Jethro's club in Devon
22:00 Inside the Comedy Mind — Alan King meets Robin Williams
23:00 Classic Concert — Johnny Dickinson

== Closure ==
Richard Digance resigned from the board of directors in August following creative differences and the station went off air soon after (because of cashflow problems).

Administrators Portland Business Solutions were called in on 3 October 2005. The slot reverted to Information TV.
