= It's a Square World =

British comedy television series

The LP (1962)

It's a Square World is a British comedy television series starring Michael Bentine and produced by the BBC. It ran from 1960 until 1964, each episode being of 30 minutes duration. The series gained Bentine a BAFTA award in 1962 for Light Entertainment, while a compilation show, screened by the BBC in 1963, won that year's Press Prize at the Rose d'Or Festival in Montreux. The shows were devised and written by Bentine and John Law. Some sketches were released on an LP.

== Concept ==
Using scale models, Bentine sank the Woolwich Ferry, sent a Chinese junk to attack the House of Commons (a sketch that was temporarily banned by the BBC as it was considered too political coming up to election time), and planted a forty-foot whale trying to enter the Natural History Museum. This stunt required 25 men standing inside the whale to move it along, which caused traffic delays. He also sent the BBC Television Centre into orbit with rockets in the basement. Best loved by many were his miniature plays on tiny sets without characters. Bentine stood over the sets and narrated as special effects and noises portrayed the movements and adventures of an imaginary tiny cast in what could be a western town one week and a haunted house the next. This feature was revived in the later series Michael Bentine's Potty Time.

The programme also collected fictitious news reports from the eight corners of the world (hence its name), read by Michael Bentine as a newsman or commentator and had many madcap sketches. In one sketch Bentine and other explorers trek through forests to find the source of the River Thames. Having reached an end point, all they find is a leaking tap. Disappointed, they start to backtrack and Bentine before leaving turns off the tap which results in the River Thames disappearing and boats ending up sunk into the mud. (This idea was also revived for Potty Time as the source of the Amazon.)

Another show included a short sketch where a detonator plunger was pushed down and a factory chimney fell in the wrong direction, demolishing a terraced house. The plunger was then pulled back up, and the house was restored as the chimney rose back into its original position (that is, the film was reversed).

Another sketch described an expedition to find mysterious beasts known only by components such as wheels and cogs. This turns into a parody of The Lost World where the explorers encounter monstrous cranes and excavators rampaging through a jungle, using sped-up film footage of real machinery. The sketch ends with the explorers producing a captured specimen, a full-size excavator, in the studio. The logistics of placing this in front of a studio audience taxed the production crew to the limit.

The show anticipated Monty Python's Flying Circus in its concepts and sketches, including Bentine's newsreader device for continuity and officialdom was mocked via a Ministry of Holes instead of a Ministry of Silly Walks. In cartoon sequences, the characters interacted with real people. These inserts were produced by Biographic Cartoon Films Ltd. The actors were seen in many different disguises and Dick Emery began to develop some of his characters in the series, like the old codger, and developed his funny voices.

=== Episodes ===
The series was revived for one colour episode in 1977 for BBC 1 called Michael Bentine's Square World. In total, 57 black and white episodes (including the pilot) were produced by the BBC. Of this total, 11 episodes are thought to no longer exist.

== Cast ==
The cast included:

- Michael Bentine
- Ronnie Barker
- Clive Dunn
- Dick Emery
- Frank Thornton
- Deryck Guyler
- John Bluthal
- Bob Todd
- Benny Lee
- Andria Lawrence
- Louis Mansi
- Leon Thau
- Freddie Earlle
- Joe Gibbons
- Len Lowe
- Janette Rowsell
- Anthea Wyndham

== Other versions ==
Professional ratings
Review scores
Source	Rating
New Record Mirror	4/5 stars

An LP was released by Parlophone in 1962 (produced by George Martin) of sketches including "Football Results", in which the newsreader gets increasingly excited as he appears to be about to win a fortune on the football pools.

There was a follow-up series in 1966 for ATV called All Square which tried to repeat the former series' success. For this series, Bentine was located in the capital city, Filthnik, in the fictitious country of Ozonia. In the 8 October 1966 episode, Bentine tries to turn Ozonia into a Mecca for tourists. This episode also featured the Jack Parnell Orchestra.
