= Cathedral (TV series) =

Educational television miniseries

Cathedral is an educational television miniseries of five episodes first broadcast in 2005 by the BBC. It describes the construction of five cathedrals in the United Kingdom: Canterbury Cathedral, Lincoln Cathedral, Winchester Cathedral, St. Giles' Cathedral, and York Minster.

The show features historical re-enactments using actors and CGI.
