= Elizabeth Knight =

British television and film actress (1944–2005)

- Born: Elizabeth Helen Knight; 1 November 1944; Oxford, Oxfordshire, England
- Died: 22 August 2005 (aged 60); Hammersmith, London, England
- Occupation: Actress
- Years active: 1958–1995
- Notable work: Carry On Camping (1969); Carry On Again Doctor (1969)

Elizabeth Knight (1 November 1944 – 22 August 2005) was a British actress known for her work in film and television.

== Life and career ==
Elizabeth Knight was born on 1 November 1944 in Oxford, Oxfordshire. She made her first film appearance in the 1968 musical Oliver! as Charlotte, maid to Mr. Sowerberry (played by Leonard Rossiter), and also appeared in the Richard Burton gangster film Villain in 1971. Her last film was the 1979 feature-length version of popular British sitcom Porridge.

Her appearances in two of the much-loved Carry On film series won her lasting recognition. She played Jane, part of Barbara Windsor's Chayste Place troupe, in Carry On Camping (May 1969). She played Nurse Willing, who assists patient Wilfrid Brambell, in Carry On Again Doctor (August 1969).

She made numerous television appearances. Her first was in a 1965 production of Charley's Aunt; her last dramatic role was in the 1980 BBC production of Pride and Prejudice. She starred alongside Joanna Lumley in 1971 Jilly Cooper-penned sitcom It's Awfully Bad for Your Eyes, Darling.

== Death ==
Elizabeth Knight died on 22 August 2005 in Hammersmith, London. She died of heart disease.

== Filmography ==
Year	Title	Role	Notes
1968	Oliver!	Charlotte	
1969	The Assassination Bureau	Nursemaid	Uncredited
1969	Carry On Camping	Jane	
1969	Carry On Again Doctor	Nurse Willing	
1971	Villain	Patti	
1979	Porridge	Sheila	

== TV credits ==
Year	Title	Role
1965	Summer Comedy Hour; Episode: Charley's Aunt	Ela Delahay
1965	Cluff (TV series); Episode: 'The Daughters'	Robina Leigh
1965	The Flying Swan (TV series); Episode: 'A Chapter of Accidents'	Frances Grainger
1965	Hereward the Wake; Episodes: 'The Broken Promise'; 'Death of a King'	Constance
1966	The Liars (TV series); Episode: 1.10	Sophia
1966	The Man in Room 17 (TV series); Episode: 'Where There's a Will'	Angela Hendy
1966	This Man Craig (TV series); Episode: 'A Question of Biology'	Sally Scott
1966	No Hiding Place (TV series); Episode: 'The Night Walker'	Pansy Tusker
1966	Mystery and Imagination (TV series); Episode: 'The Beckoning Shadow'	Ann
1966	Call My Bluff (Game show); Episode: 1.36	Herself
1967	Armchair Theatre (TV series); Episode: 'In the Name of the Law'	Conny
1967	Sam and Janet (TV series); Episode: 1.3	Patsy Marshall
1967	The Fellows (TV series); Episode: 'The Straight Way'	Girl
1967	Sorry I'm Single (TV series); Nine episodes	Karen
1967	Call My Bluff (Game show); Episode: 2.22	Herself
1968	Ooh La La! (TV series); Episodes: 'Call Me Maestro'; 'Making a Pass'	Lucille
1969	Scene (TV series/documentary); Episode: 'Terry'	Janie
1968	ITV Playhouse; Episode: 'Star Quality'	Barbara
1969	ITV Playhouse; Episode: 'Justice is a Woman'	Valeria Gowan
1969	ITV Sunday Night Theatre; Episode: 'Murder: The Blood Relation'	Nancy Tyler
1969	Call My Bluff (Game show); Episode: 4.13	Herself
1970	Rookery Nook (TV film)	Rhoda Marley
1970	Turkey Time (TV film)	Rose Adair
1971	It's Awfully Bad for Your Eyes, Darling (Sitcom); Six episodes	Clover Mason
1976	Within These Walls (TV series); Episode: Islands in the Heartline	Josie
1977	Mr Big (Sitcom); Episode: 'Vote for Rocksburgh'	Traffic warden
1980	Pride and Prejudice (Miniseries|TV serial); Episode: 1.5	First Lady Guest
1981	Call My Bluff (Game show); Episode: 16.9	Herself
1981	Call My Bluff (Game show); Episode: 16.10	Herself
