= Faze TV (TV channel) =

Faze TV was a planned television channel in the United Kingdom that aimed to be the first channel in the country specifically targeted towards gay men. It was expected to start broadcasting on 1 September 2005 on Sky Digital. However, on 8 September, the channel was scrapped due to insufficient funding, after Sky would not provide it with encrypted carriage in its then basic package, which was then called "the Family Pack". Sky does not accept any adult-themed channels for this package, along with other excluded genres including shopping and religious channels.

The channel was planned to be the first to be specifically targeted at gay men in England. The channel was the brainchild of David Bouchier, who had been the head of British Sky Broadcasting before spending time as the programming managing director for SKY Italia. The plan was to offer original programming covering news, community and health issues, fashion, clubbing and travel. Existing comedy and cult series would be purchased for broadcast. Adult programs would be offered late night. The 1 September 2005 launch was to have been promoted with an advertising campaign designed to coincide with Pride festivals during the preceding summer in London and elsewhere in the UK. As part of his plans, Bouchier expressed his disappointment at the lack of positive portrayals of gays on television and indicated in an interview that a gay channel like Faze TV was "long overdue in Britain" and that he was disappointed that positive images of gays are still missing from TV. He stressed that "The channel is gay-owned and run and will reflect how 'real' gay men live in Britain today".

As of August 2005, the developers of Faze TV reached out to prospective viewers by email asking them to make phone calls or to send emails to Sky Broadcasting asking that they add the gay-oriented channel to their basic package, noting that the company did not offer any magazine or lifestyle shows, movies or documentaries with gay-specific content.

In September 2005, Faze TV announced that they would be scrapping their planned launch, following their inability to reach agreement on carriage terms with Sky. The company stated that they had obtained adequate funding to launch the channel but that after eight months of negotiations with Sky they were unable to obtain license fees from Sky for airing the channel. The company stated that they would need the fees from Sky to cover their operating costs, which could not be covered by advertising revenues alone. The developers of the proposed channel announced that "We really wanted to deliver the quality channel which you deserve reflecting the lives and interests of gay men today in the UK. Anything less would be a mistake, and this is why with considerable sadness we have decided not to go ahead."
