= Michael Bentine's Potty Time =

1970s children's TV series

Michael Bentine's Potty Time is a British children's show, written by and starring Michael Bentine, and directed and produced by Leon Thau for Thames Television on ITV. It ran from 1973 to 1980. Bentine had introduced The Potties on a BBC show Michael Bentine Time a year earlier. The episodes consisted largely of bearded puppets (called "Potties"), comically re-enacting famous historical situations. The Potties' faces were always obscured by facial hair, with only their noses protruding. They were operated from beneath and had two distinct sizes - approximately two feet (60 cm) and one foot (30 cm) tall. All of the Potty characters were designed by Bentine, who also provided all of their voices. Their operators were from The Barry Smith Theatre of Puppets.

In 2001, it was voted into 71st place in Channel 4's 100 Greatest Kids' TV shows poll.

In the 1970s and early 80s it was broadcast in Australia on Channel 7. The series was also broadcast in New Zealand first on South Pacific Television and later on Television One.

== Other media ==
Several Region 2 DVDs of the three series have been released by Network Releasing.

This was also a title of a comic strip run in Look-in magazine featuring Bentine and the Potties, drawn by Arthur Ranson.
