= Dick Emery =

English comedian and actor (1915–1983)

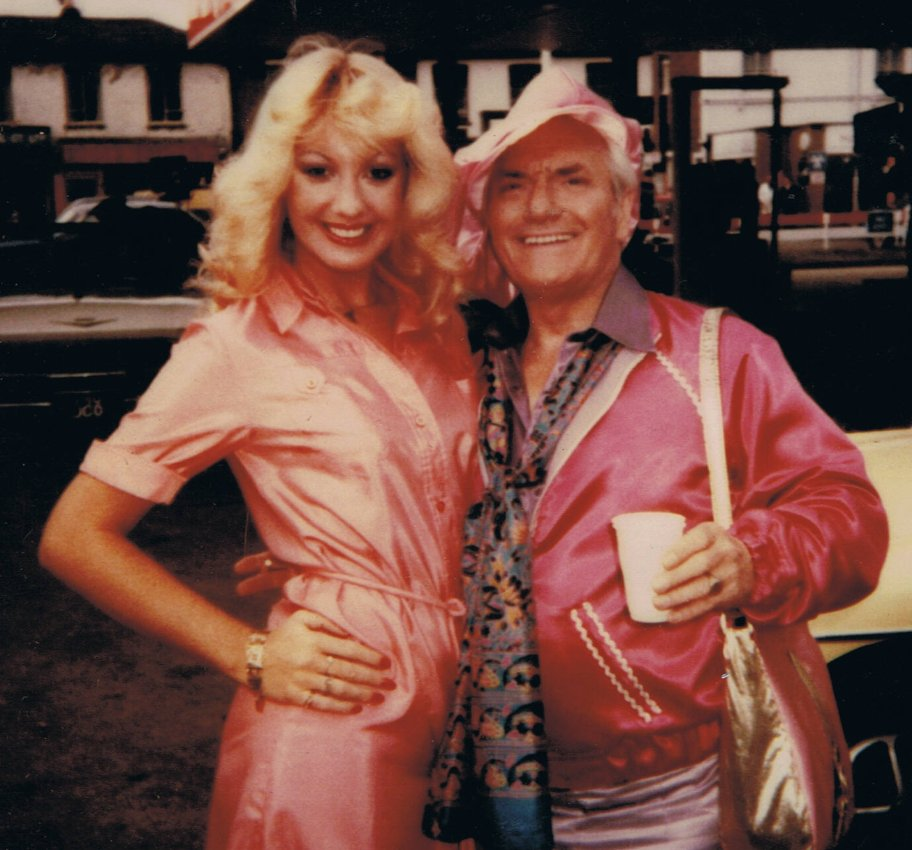
- Emery with actress and dancer Susie Silvey, filming in the 1980s
- Born: Richard Gilbert Emery; 19 February 1915; Bloomsbury, London, England
- Died: 2 January 1983 (aged 67); Denmark Hill, London, England
- Resting place: Mortlake Crematorium, Mortlake, London, England
- Years active: 1946–1983
- Spouses: Joan Salisbury (m. 1940; div. 1943) Irene Ansell (m. 1946; div. 1947) Iris Tully (m. 1955; div. 1964) Victoria Chambers (m. 1964; div. 1968) Josephine Blake (m. 1969)
- Children: Four
- Relatives: Ann Emery (half-sister)

Richard Gilbert Emery (19 February 1915 – 2 January 1983) was an English comedian and comic actor. Best known for this catchphrase, "Ooh You Are Awful... But I Like You!", his broadcasting career began on radio in the 1950s, and his self-titled television series ran from 1963 to 1981.

== Life and career ==
Richard Gilbert Emery was born 19 February 1915, in University College Hospital, Bloomsbury, London. His parents were the comedy double act Callan and Emery. They took him on tour when he was only three weeks old and gave him the occasional turn on the stage during his childhood, which was always on the move and disrupted, creating problems for the future but setting the scene for eventually going into showbusiness himself. His parents split up when he was eight and he chose to stay with his mother, who gave up showbusiness. He tried a variety of jobs before the stage: mechanic, office boy, farm hand and driving instructor.

During the Second World War he was called up to the RAF and rose to the rank of corporal. However, because of family problems, he returned to London, joining the chorus line of The Merry Widow at the Majestic Theatre, although he was subsequently recognised, arrested and imprisoned. He was recruited by Ralph Reader into the RAF Gang Show to entertain air and ground crew at bases in Great Britain.

At this time he created Vera Thin (the Forces' Sweetheart), loosely based on Vera Lynn, later saying, "I was better in drag than combat gear". After D-Day, his unit toured forward airbases.

On leaving the RAF, he returned to the theatre as a comedian. He worked at the Windmill Theatre, though his name does not appear on the plaque commemorating the acts that played there. He toured his fledgling act around the United Kingdom.

He also auditioned for various parts and in 1952 he starred in a role in a 15-minute Radio Luxembourg series on Saturdays at 7.00pm called Chance of a Lifetime. This was a quiz sponsored by Marshall Ward in which merchandise to the value of £30 was awarded to contestants. Other radio work around this time included several appearances on Workers' Playtime on the BBC, a morale-boosting show that had started during the war to entertain factory workers in their canteens. Emery also made a guest appearance on the popular BBC radio programme The Goon Show, replacing regular cast member Harry Secombe for one episode in 1957.

During 1953 he briefly formed a double act with Charlie Drake. His television debut came in 1950 on The Centre Show on the BBC. He appeared on TV programmes including Round the Bend (BBC, 1955–56) and Educating Archie (ITV, 1958–59) and appeared with his friend Tony Hancock in several episodes of The Tony Hancock Show (ITV, 1956) and Hancock's Half Hour (BBC, 1957).

He enhanced his reputation on two series with former Goon Michael Bentine: After Hours (ITV, 1958–59) and It's a Square World (BBC, 1960–64). His role as Private Chubby Catchpole in the final series of The Army Game, (ITV 1960) led to an exclusive BBC contract, and the long-running The Dick Emery Show (BBC, 1963–81) began. The show involved Emery dressing up as various characters, lasted 18 series totalling 166 episodes aired between 1963 and 1981.

In a sporadic film career he made his debut in the Goons' The Case of the Mukkinese Battle Horn (directed by Joseph Sterling, 1954). He also played bungling bank robber Booky Binns in The Big Job (directed by Gerald Thomas, 1965) and was known for vocal talents as an array of characters including "The Nowhere Man" Jeremy Hillary Boob, the Mayor of Pepperland and Max, one of the Blue Meanies in the Beatles' Yellow Submarine directed by George Dunning, in 1968.

Emery appeared in films as Shingler in The Fast Lady (1962), as an amorous man in The Wrong Arm Of The Law, as Harry in Baby Love (1968), as Mr Bateman in Loot (1970) and Ooh… You Are Awful (1972), in which he played many of the characters he had portrayed in his TV series. The plot of this comedy centred on Emery hunting down a bank account number. The digits of the number are tattooed on the bottoms of four young women. Emery has to see the girls naked, which requires disguises. One of the women is played by Liza Goddard.

Emery also recorded several novelty records, most notably "If You Love Her", which reached number 32 in 1969, and "You Are Awful", which just missed the top 40 in 1973. Other singles included "A Cockney Christmas" (1962), "You're The Only One" (1974) and "Rocking Horse Cowboy" (1979). In 1979, Emery moved to ITV for three specials before returning to the BBC in 1980 and resuming The Dick Emery Show.

By 1982, Emery was tiring of the format for his BBC series and wanted to do something different. Using a new format and character, Jewish private detective Bernie Weinstock, Emery had a new outlet – two series of comedy thrillers under the banner Emery Presents (BBC, 1982–83), Legacy of Murder and Jack of Diamonds.

== Personal life ==
Emery had a very difficult childhood initially, but things settled down following the departure of his father, Laurie Howe. He was devoted to his mother for most of his life and helped support her once he was able to work. This devotion caused problems in his marriages.

He was in six long-term relationships, marrying five times, and also had numerous affairs. He often appeared in tabloid newspapers with beautiful women.

At the beginning of the Second World War he married Joan (sometimes known as Zelda) Sainsbury and had one son, Gilbert Richard. After the failure of that marriage, he married Irene (Pip) Ansell but the marriage barely lasted six months. While working in summer season in 1950, at the Winter Gardens in Ventnor on the Isle of Wight, he met Iris Margaret Tully, who was also in the show. At the end of the season, they returned to London and set up home together in Iris' flat in Shaftesbury Avenue. Iris changed her name to Emery by deed poll until 1955, a year after she had given birth to his second son, Nicholas William. Emery and she married in 1955.

The marriage was a rocky one because Emery had several affairs while away on tour. He met the woman who became his fourth wife, Victoria Chambers, in the mid-1950s. He was torn between the two women, but in late 1958 he left Iris and moved to Thames Ditton in Surrey to set up home.

In 1960, however, he returned to Iris and his son and moved them to Thames Ditton, but he could never settle, and in 1962 he left Iris for Victoria. Iris divorced him in 1964. By this time, he had set up home in Esher. Vickie had a son Michael and a daughter Eliza with him. His last wife was Josephine Blake to whom he was still married at the time of his death, although he had left her to live with Fay Hillier, an actress 30 years his junior.

Outside showbusiness, he enjoyed flying, and held a pilot's licence from 1961 onwards. He also liked fast cars and motorcycles. He was a keen maker of scale models, and was president of the Airfix Modellers' Club. He also wrote a review feature for Meccano Magazine during 1971.

While the public took him to heart, voting him BBC TV Personality of the Year in 1972, Emery suffered from severe stage fright and low self-esteem. He underwent psychoanalysis and hypnosis, and took sedatives to try to cure the problems.

He had four children, Gilbert, Nicholas, Michael and Eliza, and was the half-brother of actress Ann Emery.

== Death ==
In December 1982, Emery was taken to a London hospital with severe chest pains. He died at the hospital from cardiorespiratory failure on 2 January 1983 at the age of 67.

== Selected filmography ==
Film

- The Super Secret Service (short) (1953) – Pules
- The Case of the Mukkinese Battle Horn (short) (1956) – Mr. Nodule / Mr.Crimp / Maurice Ponke
- Follow a Star (1959) – Inebriated Party Guest (uncredited)
- Light Up the Sky! (1960) – Harry
- A Taste of Money (1960) – Morrissey
- Mrs. Gibbons' Boys (1962) – Woodrow
- Crooks Anonymous (1962) – Reginald Cundell
- The Fast Lady (1962) – Shingler
- Just for Fun (1963) – Juke Box Jury Members
- The Wrong Arm of the Law (1963) – Man in Flat 307 (uncredited)
- The Knack...and How to Get It (1965) – uncredited voiceover
- The Big Job (1965) – Frederick 'Booky' Binns
- River Rivals (1967)
- Yellow Submarine (1968) – Jeremy Hilary Boob, Ph.D. / Lord Mayor / Max (voice)
- Baby Love (1969) – Harry Pearson
- Loot (1970) – Mr. Bateman
- Ooh... You Are Awful (1972) – Charlie Tully
- Find the Lady (1976) – Leo

Television

- The Adventures of Aggie (1956–57)
- Faces of Jim (1961–63)
- The Dick Emery Show (1963–1981) 19 series – 162 episodes – Various Characters
  - The Dick Emery Christmas Show: For Whom the Jingle Bells Toll (1980) – Various Characters
- The Dick Emery Hour (1979) 3 episodes – Himself / Various Characters
- Legacy of Murder (1982) – Bernie Weinstock / Lord Algrave / Joe Galleano / Monica Danvers-Crichton
- Jack of Diamonds (1983) – Bernie Weinstock / Cyril Blackman / Det. Insp. Dearlove / Lady Holtye / Gen. von Klaus (Last appearance)
