= Eric Guillon =

French character designer

- Occupations: Character Designer; Director
- Years active: 1994-present
- Employer(s): Fantôme Animation (1994-99); Illumination (2010-present)
- Known for: Despicable Me; The Secret Life of Pets; Sing; Not Alone

Eric Guillon is a French character designer, mainly responsible for creating the characters from Despicable Me, an animated franchise produced from Illumination Entertainment, including the studio's iconic mascots, The Minions.

Besides designing the characters for the studio's own films, including some from The Secret Life of Pets and Sing franchises, he also co-directed Despicable Me 3 (2017) and is set to direct his first original film Not Alone (2027).

== Career ==
=== Fantôme Animation ===
Guillon started out studying application arts and worked in advertising for five years. He began working as a designer with Fantôme Animation for six years, on the series Insektors as well as the other projects.

=== Passion Paris ===
Guillon worked on a few commercials with Pierre Coffin around at Passion Pictures in Paris.

=== Illumination ===
In 2011, Guillon was nominated with Yarrow Cheney for Outstanding Achievement for Production Design in an Animated Feature Production for his first film Despicable Me (2010) at the 38th Annie Awards, but was lost to How to Train Your Dragon (2010) by Pierre-Olivier Vincent. In 2013, Guillon was nominated with Cherey and Colin Stimpson for Outstanding Achievement for Character Design in a Feature Production at the 40th Annie Awards on the film The Lorax (2012), but was lost to ParaNorman (2012) by Heidi Smith. In 2014, Guillon was nominated for two awards on Despicable Me 2 (2013) at the 41st Annie Awards, but lost to Frozen (2013) and The Croods (2013). In 2016, Guillon was nominated for two awards at the 43rd Annie Awards on Minions (2015), but both lost to Pixar's Inside Out (2015). He later got nominated for Character Design in a Feature Production on The Secret Life of Pets (2016) at the 44th Annie Awards and Despicable Me 3 (2017) at the 45th Annie Awards, but lost to Zootopia (2016) by Cory Loftis and Coco (2017) by Daniel Arriaga, Daniela Strijleva, Greg Dykstra, Alonso Martinez and Zaruhi Galstyan.

On June 2026, it was announced that Guillon will direct his first original film from Illumination called Not Alone (2027), following his co-direction from Despicable Me 3 (2017).

== Filmography ==
=== Film ===
Year	Film	Role	Company
2010	Despicable Me	Art Director/Character Designer	Illumination Entertainment
2012	The Lorax	Art Director/Character Designer	Illumination Entertainment
2013	Despicable Me 2	Production Designer/Character Designer	Illumination Entertainment
2015	Minions	Production Designer/Character Designer	Illumination Entertainment
2016	The Secret Life of Pets	Production Designer/Character Designer	Illumination Entertainment
2016	Sing	Production Designer/Character Designer	Illumination Entertainment
2017	Despicable Me 3	Co-Director/Character Designer	Illumination Entertainment
2018	The Grinch	Character Designer	Illumination Entertainment
2019	The Secret Life of Pets 2	Character Designer	Illumination Entertainment
2021	Sing 2	Character Designer	Illumination Entertainment
2022	Minions: The Rise of Gru	Character Designer	Illumination Entertainment
2024	Despicable Me 4	Character Designer	Illumination Entertainment
2026	Minions & Monsters	Character Designer	Illumination Entertainment
2027	Not Alone	Director	Illumination Entertainment

=== Television ===
Year	Show	Role	Company
1994–1995	Insektors	Designer/Layout Management	Fantôme Animation
