= Andy Secombe =

Welsh actor

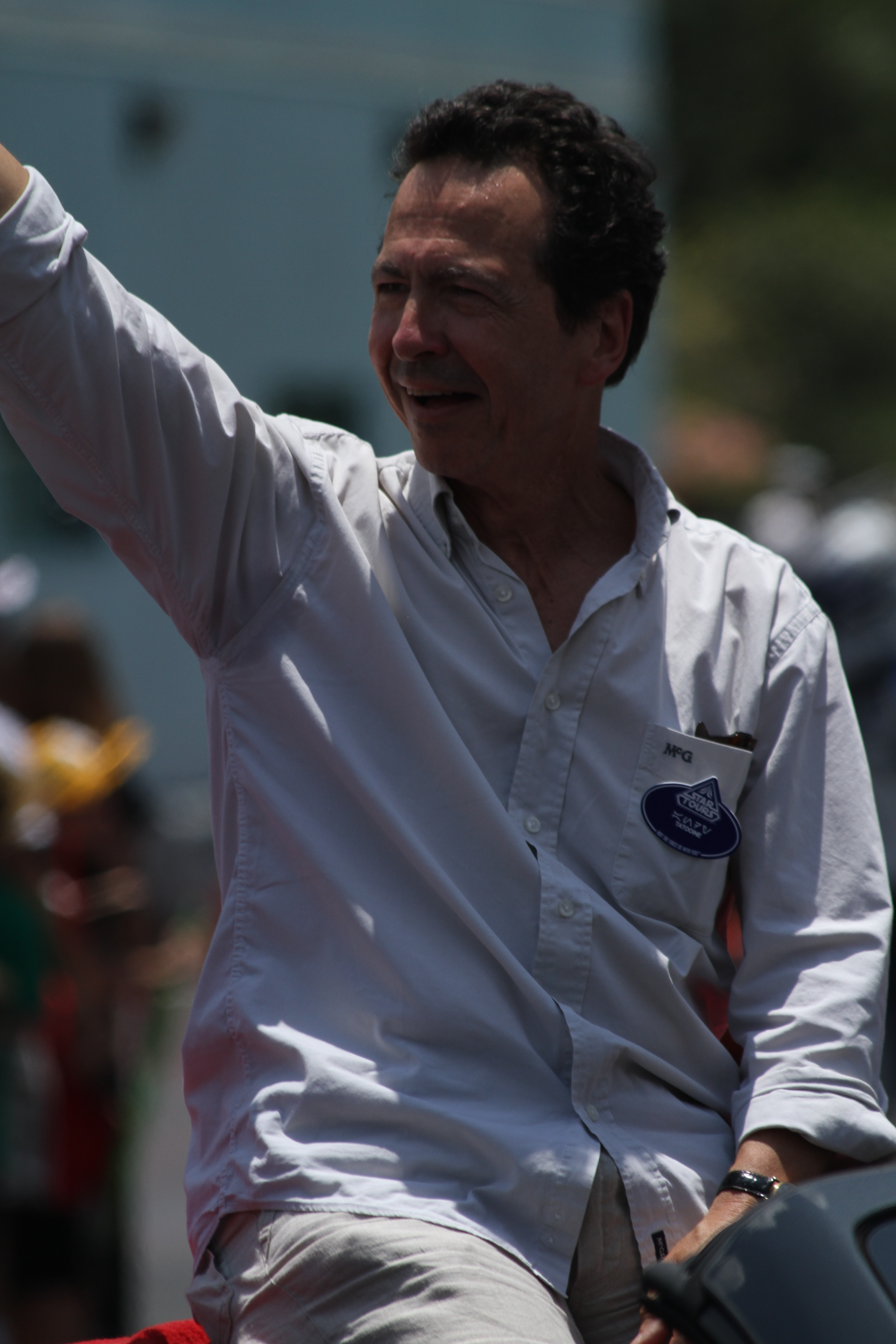
- Secombe in 2012
- Born: Andrew James Secombe; 26 April 1953 (age 73); Mumbles, Wales
- Education: Central School of Speech and Drama
- Occupations: Actor; author
- Years active: 1975–present
- Spouse: Caroline Bliss (m. 1995)
- Father: Harry Secombe
- Relatives: Fred Secombe (uncle)

Andrew James Secombe (born 26 April 1953) is a Welsh actor and author.

== Early life and education ==
Born in Mumbles, in south Wales, Secombe is son of comedian/singer Harry Secombe (whom he later impersonated in a Goon Show special). He attended the City of London Freemen's School in Ashtead, Surrey.

== Career ==
=== Acting ===
Andy Secombe is an award-nominated stage, screen and radio actor. He trained at the Central School of Speech and Drama after which he spent several years criss-crossing the country both touring and in rep. His early career included seasons at both the Old Vic (King Lear, The Rivals) and the Young Vic (Hamlet, Stags and Hens, Coriolanus and What a Way to Run a Revolution). Other theatrical performances includes Godspell, Guys and Dolls, Around the World in Eighty Days, Long Days' Journey into Night, Benjamin Britten's A Midsummer Night's Dream, The Hitchhiker's Guide to the Galaxy Live! tour and The Invisible Man in the West End. He was recently Offie-nominated for playing Mr Gillie in the play of the same name at the Finborough Theatre.

On television he was a regular on both Playschool and Playaway and also appeared in the BBC TV children's sketch show Fast Forward and played Rover the Dog in Chips' Comic. He was one of the five in Five Alive and a regular on The Brian Conley Show. Other television appearances include Star Cops, Amnesty Beausire, Executive Stress, The Legend of Robin Hood, The Bill, Casualty, The Detectives, Unreported Incident, Britannia and Killing Eve.

In film, he is best known for providing the voice of Watto in the Star Wars prequels and in tie-in media relating to the Star Wars franchise. He also voiced Quello, another Toydarian, in Star Wars: Knights of the Old Republic II: The Sith Lords.

He has contributed vocals to a number of video games, including Nelly Cootalot: The Fowl Fleet and two entries in the Broken Sword series of games. For Penguin Audiobooks, he has recorded four novels by Mexican author Oscar de Muriel: The Strings of Murder, A Fever of the Blood, A Mask of Shadows and Loch of the Dead. He also regularly reads books for the Royal National Institute of Blind People (RNIB) and has also performed in radio productions, recently playing Reverend Wavering in the internet radio series Wooden Overcoats.

In March 2017, he starred in four episodes of the third series of The Missing Hancocks for BBC Radio 4; episodes that were originally aired in 1955 in the second series of Hancock's Half Hour starring his father Harry, after Tony Hancock had disappeared.

=== Writing ===
In the 2000s, Secombe focused on writing. He has penned five fantasy novels, including Limbo, Limbo Two: The Final Chapter and The Last House in the Galaxy. Looking for Mr Piggy-Wig (2008), about a post-nuclear Britain after the 'New Battle of Britain' is described by The Guardian as "best taken as a spoof on the genre". Endgame (2009) was criticised by Publishers Weekly for its "two-dimensional, clichéd characters and the tiresomely predictable story line".

In 2010 he published the book Growing Up with the Goons which is a memoir about growing up in the shadow of his father.

== Personal life ==
Secombe is married to actress Caroline Bliss, and as of 2013, the couple were living in Goonbell, Cornwall, with their two children.

== Filmography ==
=== Film ===
Year	Title	Role	Notes
1975	I Don't Want to Be Born	Delivery Boy	
1976	Adventures of a Taxi Driver	Third Kidnapper	
1999	Star Wars: Episode I – The Phantom Menace	Watto (voice)	
2002	Star Wars: Episode II – Attack of the Clones	Watto (voice)	
2016	The Hitchhiker's Guide to the Galaxy Radio Show Live	Max Quordlepleen / Benjy Mouse (voice)	

=== Television ===
Year	Title	Role	Notes
1975	The Legend of Robin Hood	Brett	Part 3
1980	Fox	Don	Episode: "The Perfect Scapegoat Syndrome"
1981	Prisoners of Conscience	DINA man	Episode: "William Beausire"
1983	Chips' Comic		
1984	Aladdin and the Forty Thieves	Thief	TV film
1984–1986	Fast Forward	Himself / Various characters	
1986	What a Way to Run a Revolution		TV film
1986	Five Alive	Various characters	13 episodes
1987	Star Cops	Brian Lincoln	Episode: "An Instinct for Murder"
1988	The Play on One	Simon	Episode: "Unreported Incident"
1988	The Bill	D.S. Dougan	Episode: "Light Duties"
1988	Executive Stress	Pierre de Savarin	Series 3 Episode 3
1989-1990	This Way Up		13 episodes
1994–1995	Insektors	Godfrey / Bentley / Fugg / Queen Katheter (voices)	
1996	Casualty	Ray Hyams	Episode: "Relative Valueso"
1997	Peak Practice	Alan Stark	
2010	The Unforgettable Harry Secombe	Himself	TV movie documentary
2014	Spike Milligan: Love, Light and Peace	Himself	TV movie documentary
2015	Supreme Tweeter	Gerald	Episode: "#TheRedScare"
2019	Killing Eve	Eric	Episode: "Smell Ya Later"
2019	Britannia	Tribal Elder	Season 2 Episode 1
2020	Coronation Street	Judge	Episodes: 9970, 9971
2022	Kate & Koji	Twitcher 4	Episode: "Memories"

=== Short films ===
Year	Title	Role	Notes
1978	Twenty Times More Likely		
2012	Lego Star Wars: The Empire Strikes Out	Watto (voice)	TV Short
2015	The Roaring	Frank	
2017	Captain Baylety's Heir	Himself / John Tall	

=== Video games ===
Year	Title	Role	Notes
1999	Star Wars: Episode I - Racer	Watto (voice)	
1999	Star Wars: Episode I - The Phantom Menace	Watto (voice)	
2002	Star Wars: Racer Revenge	Watto (voice)	
2003	Broken Sword: The Sleeping Dragon	Flap / Alphonse (voices)	
2004	Star Wars: Knights of the Old Republic II - The Sith Lords	Quello (voice)	
2005	Lego Star Wars: The Video Game	Watto (voice)	Uncredited, archival audio
2006	Broken Sword: The Angel of Death	(voice)	
2007	Lego Star Wars: The Complete Saga	Watto (voice)	Uncredited, archival audio
2012	Kinect Star Wars	Watto (voice)	
2016	Nelly Cootalot: The Fowl Fleet	Dr Periwig (voice)	
2022	Lego Star Wars: The Skywalker Saga	Watto (voice)	

=== Writing credits ===
Year	Title	Notes
1999	The Three Friends... and Jerry	Episode: "Dirty Älgers/Överlevnadslägret" (storyline)
2000–2002	Bob the Builder	2 episodes: "Spud and Squawk" & "Bob and the Bandstand"
