= Caroline Bliss =

English actress (born 1961)

- Born: 7 July 1961 (age 65); England
- Years active: 1982–1996
- Notable credit(s): Miss Moneypenny in The Living Daylights and Licence to Kill
- Spouse: Andy Secombe (m. 1995)
- Children: 2

Caroline Bliss (born 7 July 1961) is an English former actress who trained at the Bristol Old Vic Theatre School. She played M's secretary, Miss Moneypenny, in the James Bond films of the Timothy Dalton era, The Living Daylights and Licence to Kill. The character had previously been played by Lois Maxwell. Her first role was as Princess Diana in Charles & Diana: A Royal Love Story (1982).

== Personal life ==
Bliss is the granddaughter of composer Sir Arthur Bliss, former Master of the Queen's Music. She is married to author and actor Andy Secombe, son of singer Harry Secombe, and as of 2013, the couple were living in Goonbell, Cornwall, with their two children.

She now describes herself as an emotional intuitive and teacher of enlightenment. She is also a regular teacher with Alternatives in London.

== Filmography ==
Bliss's film and television work includes appearances in:

=== Television ===
Year	Name	Role	Reference
1982	Charles & Diana: A Royal Love Story	Princess Diana	
1984	Killer Contract	Rosa Kossack	
1985	My Brother Jonathan	Edie Martyn	
1987	The Moneymen	Sarah	
1990	The Paradise Club	DI Sarah Turnbull	
1994	Insektors	Aelia	
1996	Ruth Rendell – A Case of Coincidence	Sarah Quin	

=== Film ===
Year	Name	Role
1987	The Living Daylights	Miss Moneypenny
1989	Licence to Kill	Miss Moneypenny
1989	Braxton	Vanessa Rawlings
1996	Blitzlicht	

== Theatre ==
Her theatre work includes:

- Blood Brothers
- Blue Remembered Hills
- Eve
- Faust (Lyric Hammersmith)
- Fuente Ovejuna
- Good
- Particular Friendships
- Romeo and Juliet
- Rough Justice
- The Invisible Man
- The Night They Raided Minsky's

Acting roles
Preceded by Lois Maxwell	Miss Moneypenny actress 1987 – '89	Succeeded by Samantha Bond
