= Portrait of Mary Gainsborough =

1777 painting by Thomas Gainsborough

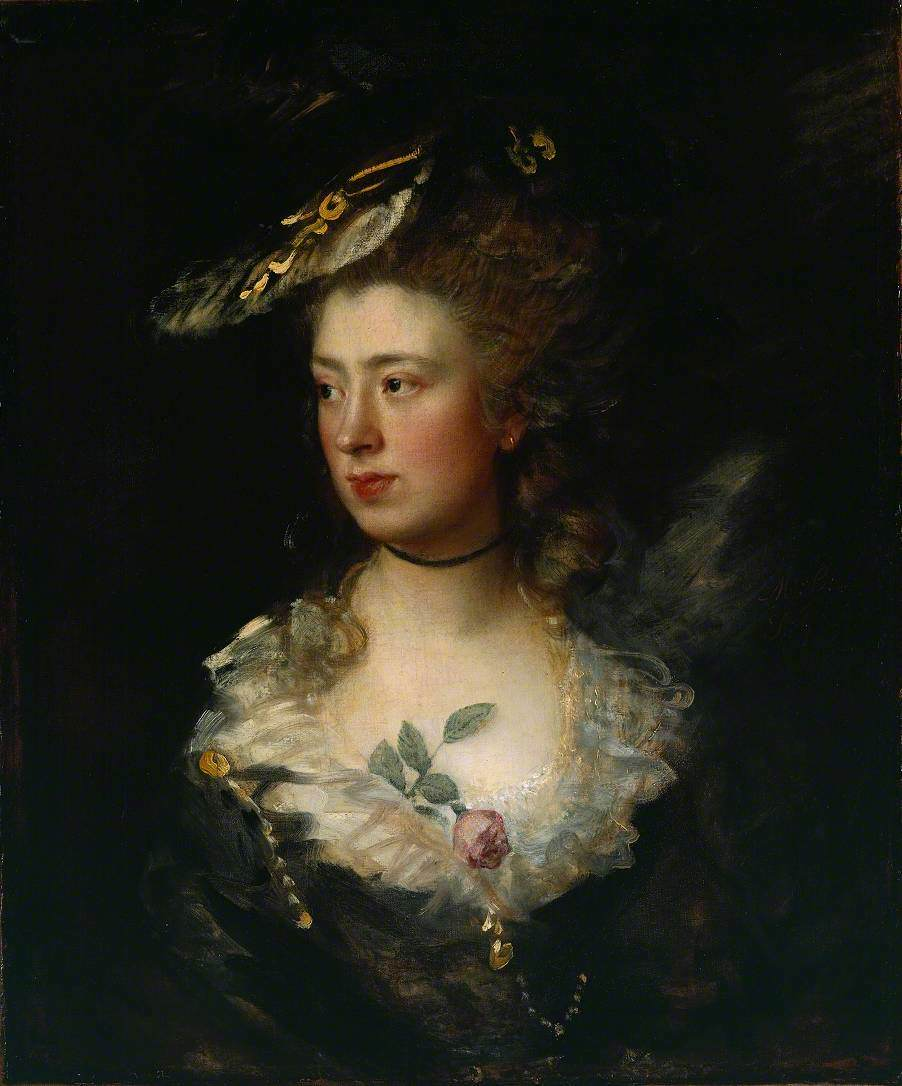
- Artist: Thomas Gainsborough
- Year: 1777
- Type: Oil on canvas, portrait painting
- Dimensions: 77.5 cm × 64.8 cm (30.5 in × 25.5 in)
- Location: National Gallery; London

Portrait of Mary Gainsborough is an oil on canvas portrait painting by the British artist Thomas Gainsborough, from 1777. It depicts his elder daughter Mary Gainsborough. In 1780, she married the German musician Johann Christian Fischer but the relationship quickly ended in separation. Gainsborough admired the Old Masters, and the painting resembles the Flemish artist Peter Paul Rubens's portrait of his wife.

At the time he produced the work, Gainsborough was a leading portraitist of London high society having moved there from the fashionable spa resort of Bath. Around the same time he produced Margaret Gainsborough, holding a Theorbo, a portrait of her younger sister. The works remained in the family for many years. Today the painting of Mary is in the collection of the Tate Britain, having been acquired in 1945. In 2025, it went on display at the National Gallery, in London.

== See also ==
- The Painter's Daughters Chasing a Butterfly, a 1756 painting featuring Gainsborough's daughters as children

== Bibliography ==
- Belsey, Hugh. Gainsborough's Family. Gainsborough's House Society, 1988.
- Brophy, John. The Face in Western Art. Harrap, 1963.
- Hamilton, James. Gainsborough: A Portrait. Hachette UK, 2017.
- Sloman, Susan. Gainsborough in London. Modern Art Press, 2021.
