= Johann Christian Fischer =

German composer and oboist

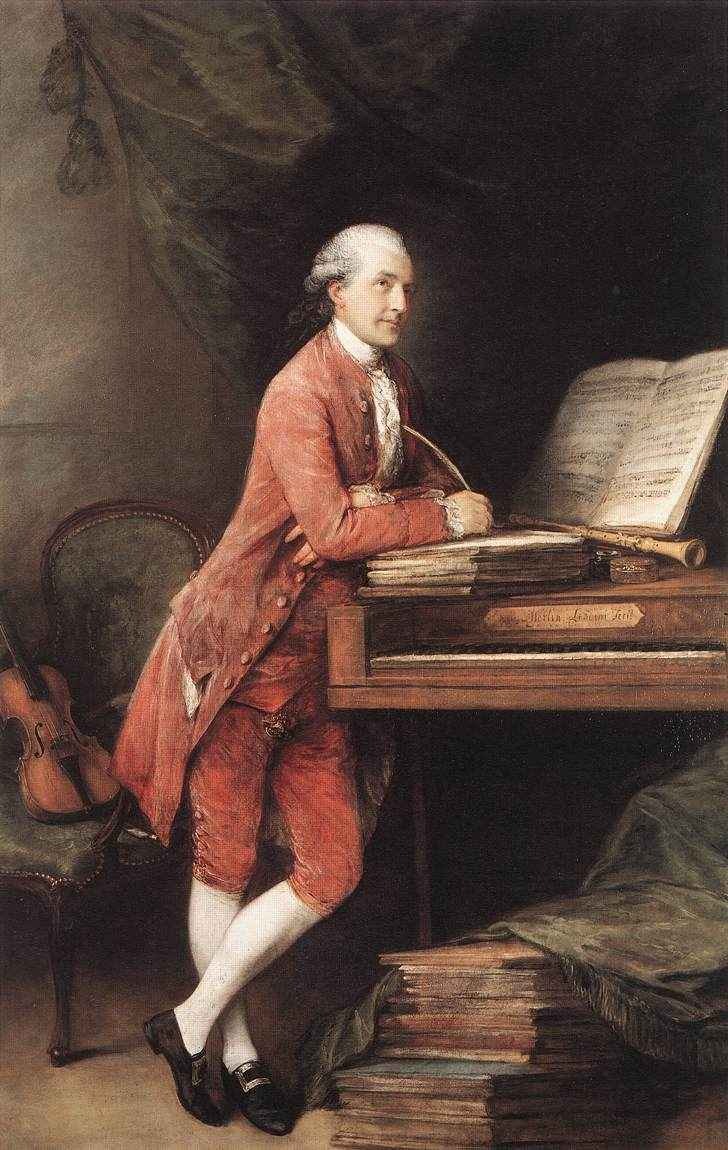
Portrait, by Thomas Gainsborough, Fischer's father-in-law, 1780, the year he married Mary Gainsborough (Royal Collection)

Johann Christian Fischer (c. 1733 – 29 April 1800) was a German composer and oboist, one of the best-known oboe soloists in Europe during the 1770s.

Employed as a music copyist and theatre director for the Duke of Mecklenburg-Schwerin at Ludwigslust, Fischer is now credited with the unique Symphony with Eight Obbligato Timpani, formerly attributed to Johann Wilhelm Hertel, court composer at Schwerin. He spent some time in Dresden, but left after the Prussian occupation in the Seven Years' War for extensive concertizing tours, ending in London, where he was active as a performer, composer, and a teacher, and introduced the Continental narrow-bore model of oboe that replaced the bright and penetrating straight-topped English type. In London Fischer joined the largely German "Queen's Band" of George III's German Queen, Charlotte of Mecklenburg-Strelitz.

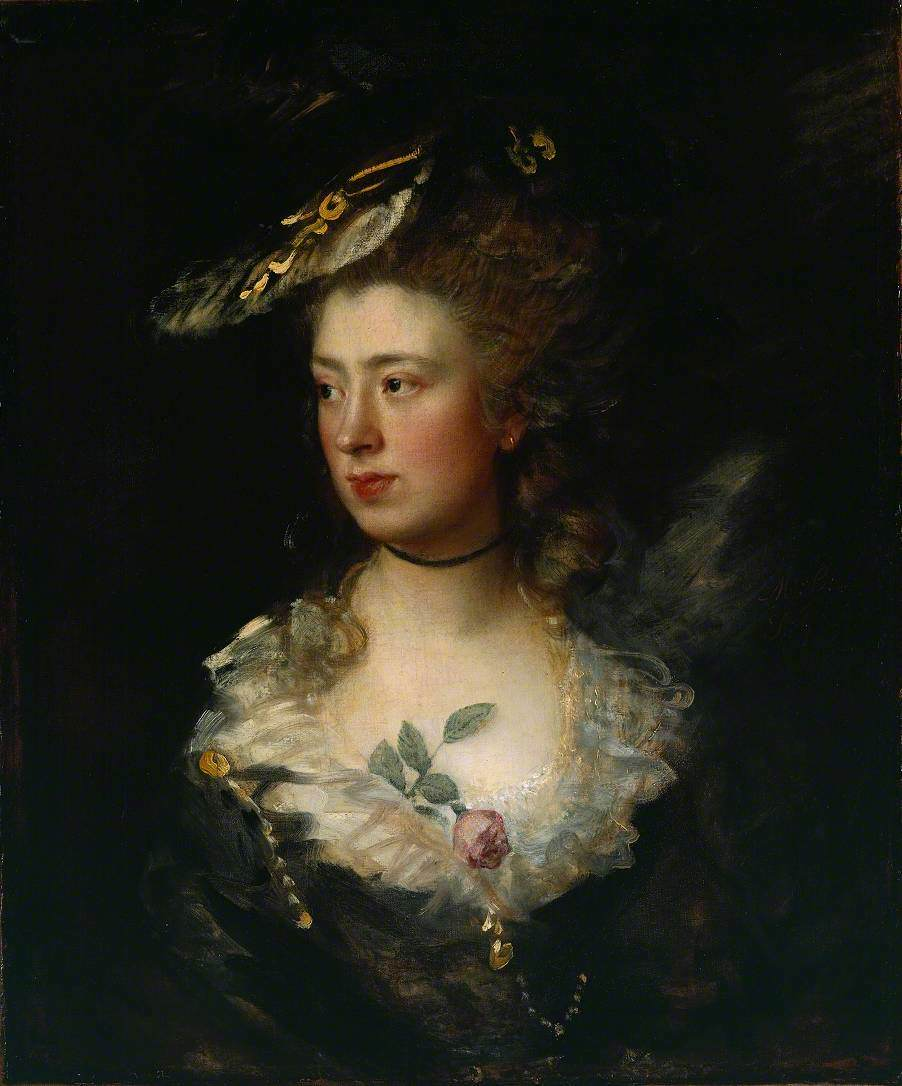
Portrait of Mary Gainsborough, 1777. Fisher's marriage to Mary, daughter of the artist ended within a year

Fischer was a contemporary of Thomas Gainsborough, and in fact, they were friends. Fischer formed an attachment with Gainsborough's daughter Mary ("Molly") while he carried on flirtation with Gainsborough's other daughter Margaret ("Peggy"). In February 1780, Fischer married Mary, but the marriage only lasted 8 months due to their discord and Fischer's deceit.

Fischer published several teaching manuals for the oboe, with varying titles: The Compleat Tutor for the Hautboy (ca 1770), New and Complete Instructions for the Oboe or Hoboy (ca 1780) and The Hoboy Preceptor (1800). Among his students was composer and oboist Charles J. Suck.

An etching/aquatint A Sunday concert by Charles Loraine Smith, published 4 June 1782, shows a distinguished musical group gathered round a harpsichord, with Fischer and Charles Burney among them.

Mozart composed a set of Twelve Variations in C on a Menuett of Johann Christian Fischer (K.179 [189a]).
