= Twice Brightly =

1974 novel by Harry Secombe

- First edition
- Author: Harry Secombe
- Language: English
- Genre: Comic novel
- Publisher: Robson Books
- Publication date: 1974
- Publication place: United Kingdom
- Media type: Print (Hardback & Paperback)
- Pages: 224 pp
- ISBN: 0-903895-23-4
- OCLC: 3074314
- Dewey Decimal: 823/.9/14
- LC Class: PZ4.S4448 Tw PR6069.E25

Twice Brightly is a comic novel by Harry Secombe, fictionalising his experiences as a recently demobbed Welsh serviceman and army comic returning from the battlefields of North Africa and Italy and struggling to make a living in the British Variety Theatres after the Second World War. The lead character is a Welsh comic called Larry Gower, Secombe's alter ego. The title is a pun on the phrase "twice nightly". Upon release in 1974 the book was the first novel of his to be published.

== Plot summary ==
For young servicemen who had spent six years fighting fascism, postwar Britain was a drab, oppressive place. For a young and untried army comic keen on the Marx brothers and Jimmy Cagney, a Yorkshire Variety theatre in February was a vision of Hell itself.

== Film, TV or theatrical adaptations ==
It was dramatised as a 60-minute Radio 4 radio play by Harry's son David Secombe in 2006, first broadcast that year and repeated on Saturday 19 May 2007. This ended with Gower as a success, leaving for London to take part in "Crazy People", a play by his fellow ex-soldier and comic Jim Moriarty - this is a fictionalisation of the initial stages of the Goon Show, and Moriarty (deriving his name from the Goon character Count Jim Moriarty) is a fictionalised Spike Milligan.

=== Cast ===
- Larry Gower (Secombe's alter ego)...... Christian Patterson
- Wally ...... Dominic Frisby
- Tom ...... Philip Jackson
- Julie ...... Becky Hindley
- April ...... Katy Secombe (Harry's daughter)
- June ...... Ella Smith
- Joe ...... Gerard McDermott
- Jim ...... John Cummins
- Mrs Ma Rogers, landlady ...... Carolyn Pickles
- Hubert ...... Geoffrey Beevers
- Director Steven Canny

== Reviews ==
The novel became the first ever known book be reviewed in print by a member of the British royal family, with the then Prince Charles giving the work a positive review in the weekly comic magazine Punch in 1974.
