= Mary Gainsborough =

Daughter of Thomas Gainsborough (1750–1826)

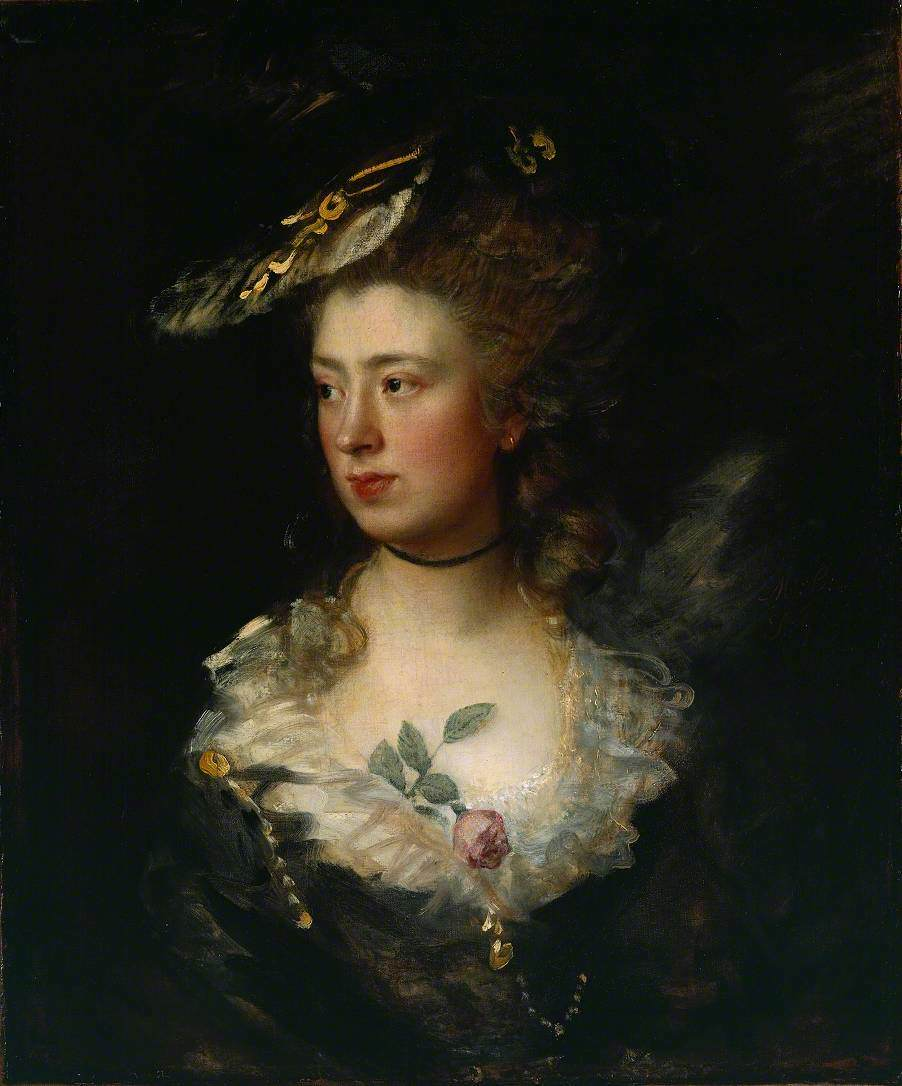
- Portrait of Mary Gainsborough by Thomas Gainsborough, 1777
- Born: 31 January 1750; Sudbury, Suffolk, England
- Died: 2 July 1826 (aged 76); London, England
- Burial place: St Mary's Church, Hanwell
- Spouse: Johann Christian Fischer (m. 1780; div. 1780)
- Father: Thomas Gainsborough
- Relatives: Margaret Gainsborough (sister)

Mary "Molly" Gainsborough Fischer (/ˈɡeɪnzbərə/; 31 January 1750 – 2 July 1826) was the eldest surviving daughter of English painter Thomas Gainsborough and his wife, Margaret Burr (1728–1797). In her later years, Mary suffered from a mental disorder; it is often speculated that she experienced depression or early-onset dementia.

== Biography ==
=== Birth and background ===
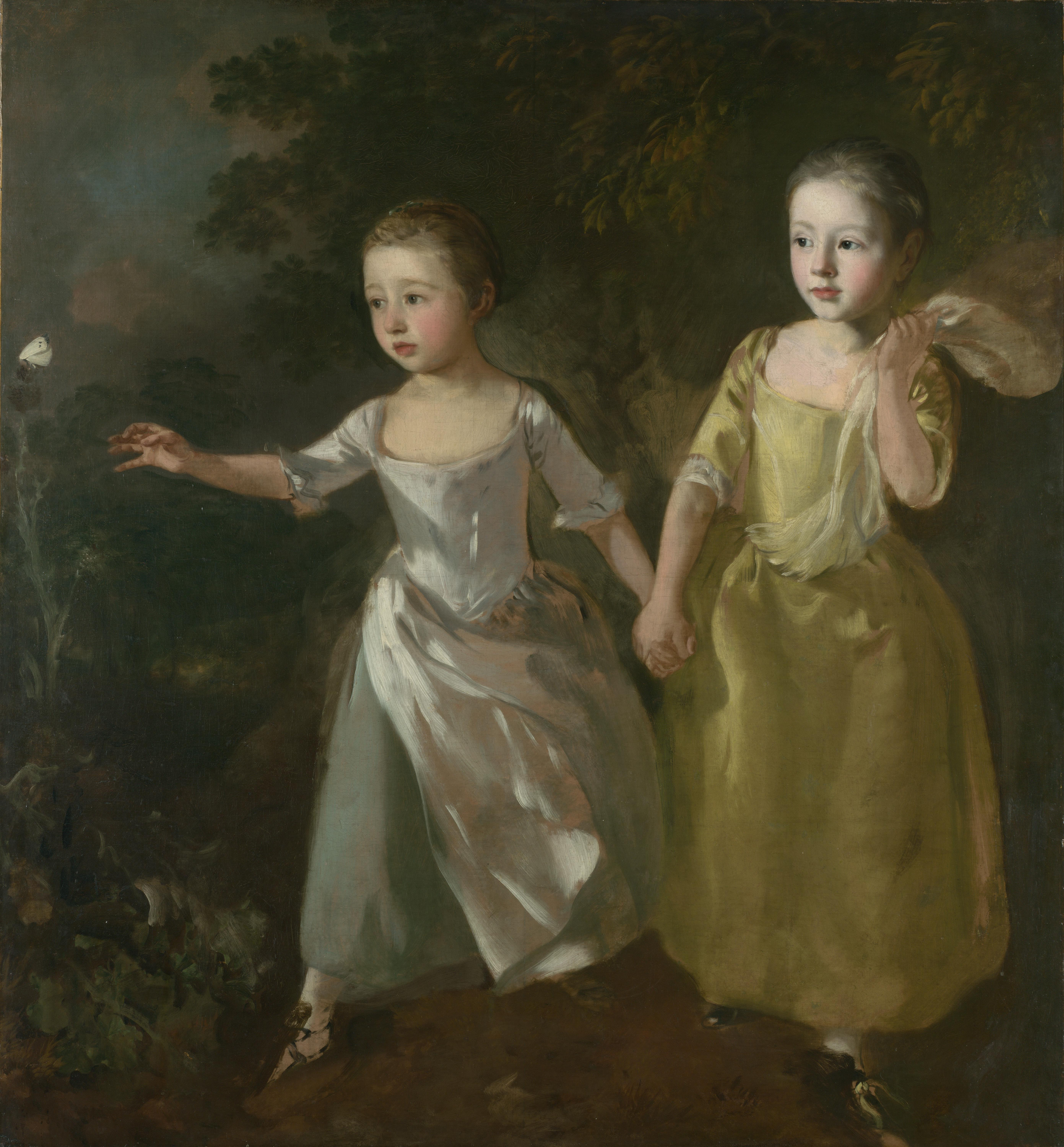
Portrait of Mary (right) and her sister Margaret (left) by their father Thomas, 1756

Mary was born on 31 January 1750 in Sudbury, Suffolk. Before her birth, her mother had given birth to a daughter of the same name, Mary (died 1748). She had a younger sister Margaret ("Peggy").

Her father Thomas Gainsborough, an accomplished English painter and her mother Margaret Burr, the illegitimate daughter of the Duke of Beaufort, married in 1746.

=== Childhood ===
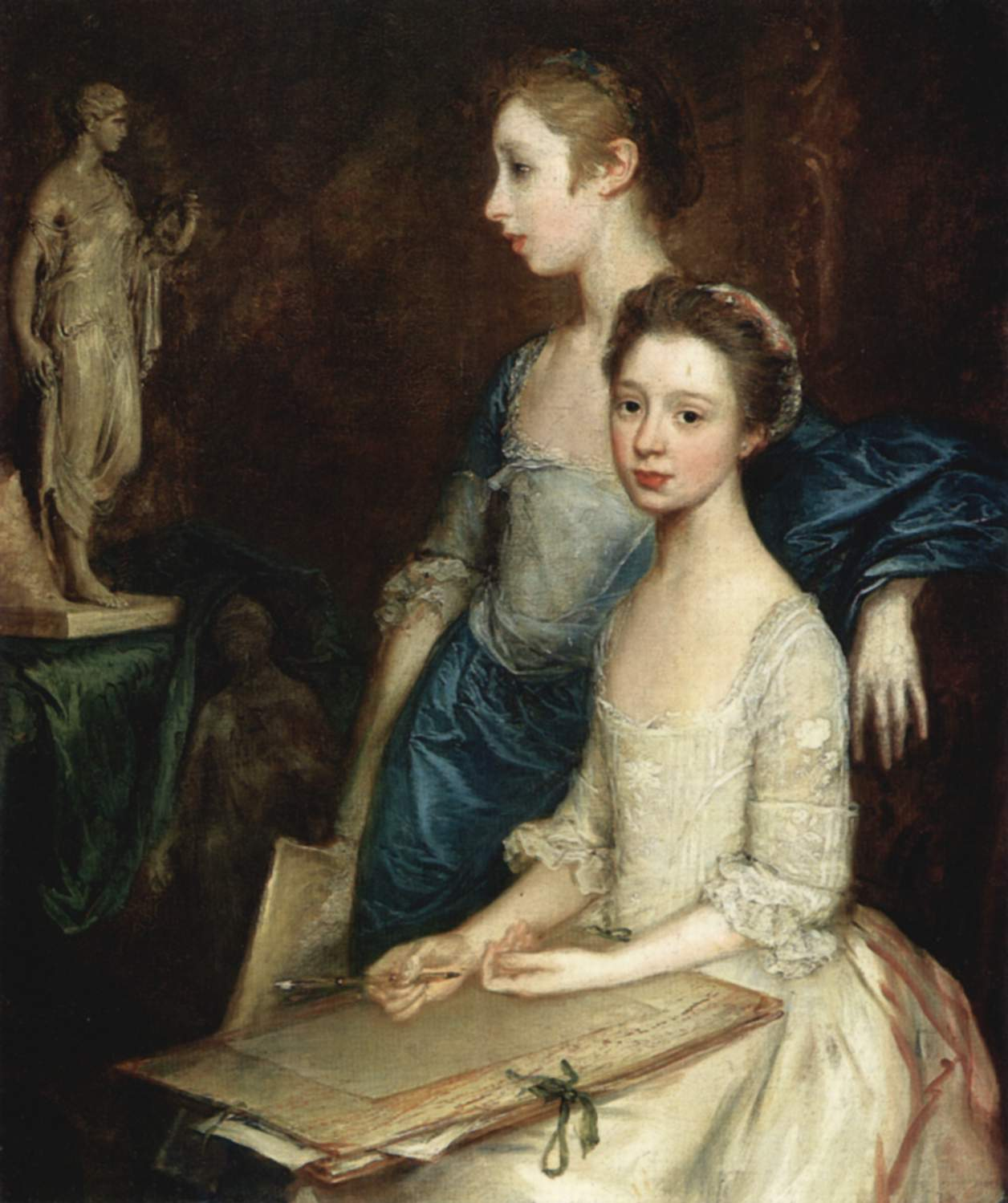
Portrait of the Artist's Daughters, c. 1763–4

By 1752, at the age of two, Mary and her family had settled in Ipswich. Although the numbers of commissions for her father's portraiture increased, his clientele was primarily made up of local merchants and squires.

In 1759, her family moved within England again to Bath, living at number 17 The Circus. There, her father was capable of attracting fashionable clients. A year later, Mary was baptized on 3 February 1760.

=== London ===
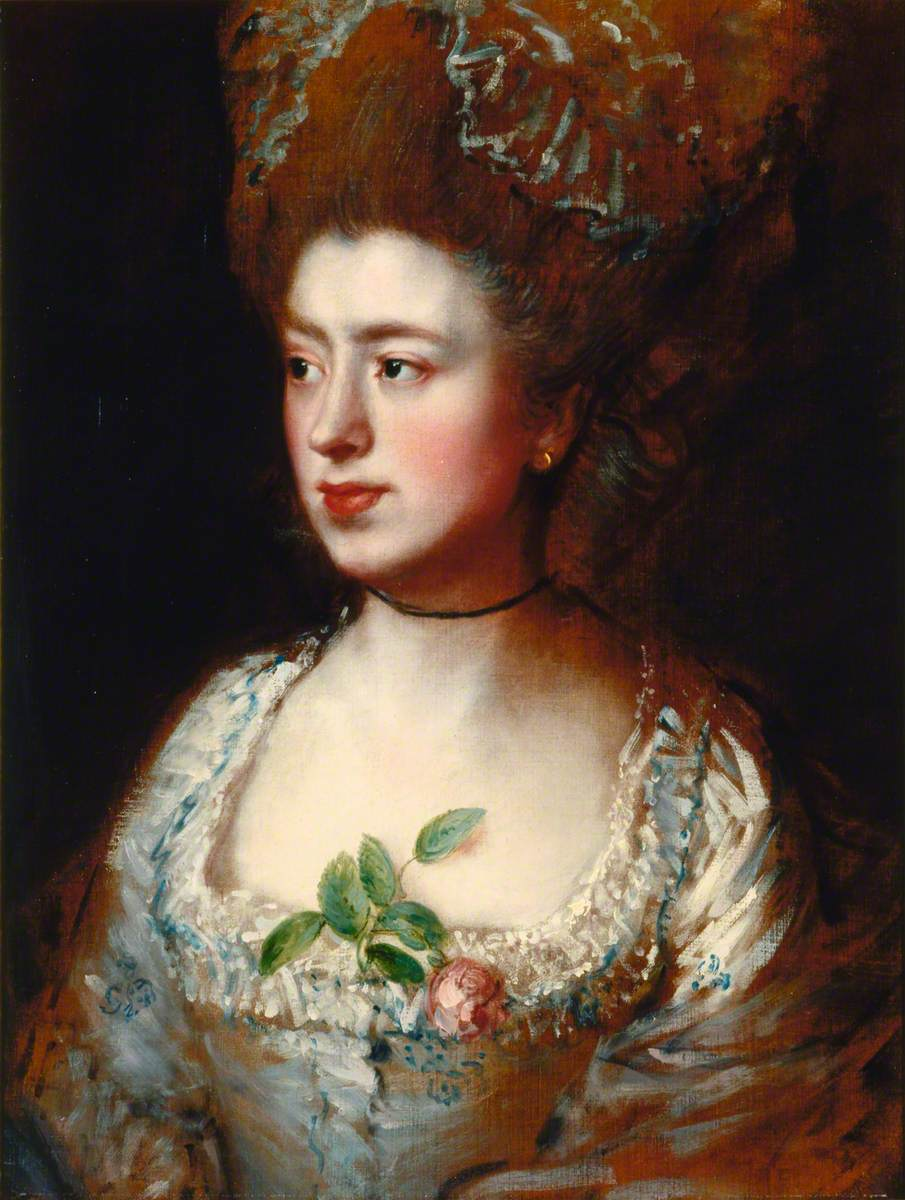
1770 portrait

In 1774, Mary and her family moved to London to live in Schomberg House at Pall Mall. A commemorative blue plaque was established on the house in 1951. In February 1780, Mary married Johann Christian Fischer, a contemporary of her father and German composer. She was thirty years old and he was seventeen years her senior.

Mary and her husband soon formed an attachment. However, to her father's dismay, Fischer continued his flirtation with Peggy. In October 1780, the couple divorced; the marriage between them lasted only eight months, owing to Fischer's discord and deceit.

=== Later life and death ===
After her divorce and her father's death, the sisters reconciled and soon returned to their parents' house. They lived together with their mother in Schomberg House until 1793. Peggy became the nurse and protector of Mary, now suffering from mental health issues. They stayed together until Peggy's death in 1820. Less than a decade later, Mary died on 2 July 1826 at the age of 76. She is interred in the St Mary's Church in Hanwell.
