= Charles J. Suck =

18th-century composer in London

Charles J. Suck was an 18th-century composer, oboist, and flutist who was active in London during the 1780s. The European Magazine described him as "proficient on both the oboe and the German flute." He is particularly remembered for his Trio no. 1 in C major.

== Biography ==
Not much is known about Suck's background, with his date and place of birth currently unknown. Some evidence suggests that he may have been of Central European descent. One of the earliest mentions of Suck was a notice for a benefit concert given by Johann Christian Fischer on 16 May 1781 which described Suck as a "scholar" of Fischer. Suck and Fischer played in several more London concerts together during the 1780s.

In 1784 Suck performed a double concerto with fellow oboist Friedrich Ramm and in May and June of that year performed in the Handel Commemoration at Westminster Abbey and the Pantheon. It was also the year that his set of six trios was published; two each for oboe, flute and violin, with violin and cello. Melodious and well crafted, the trios, particularly the first one, became popular chamber performance pieces during the latter part of the 18th century. George IV, then the Prince of Wales, was notably an exponent of the pieces.

The last known correspondence surrounding Suck is a May 1789 article in the Public Advertiser which stated that Suck was unable to appear at a concert (18 May 1789) at the Hanover Square Rooms where he was supposed to premiere an overture. He had broken his right arm at a gentleman's musical party earlier that month and was unable to perform. After this point, no accounts of performances by Suck or compositions by Suck have been found. Scholars have speculated that he may have moved away from London or that his accident had something to do with the end of his career.
