= St Mary's Church, Hanwell =

Church in Ealing, London

Saint Mary
- St Mary’s Church Hanwell
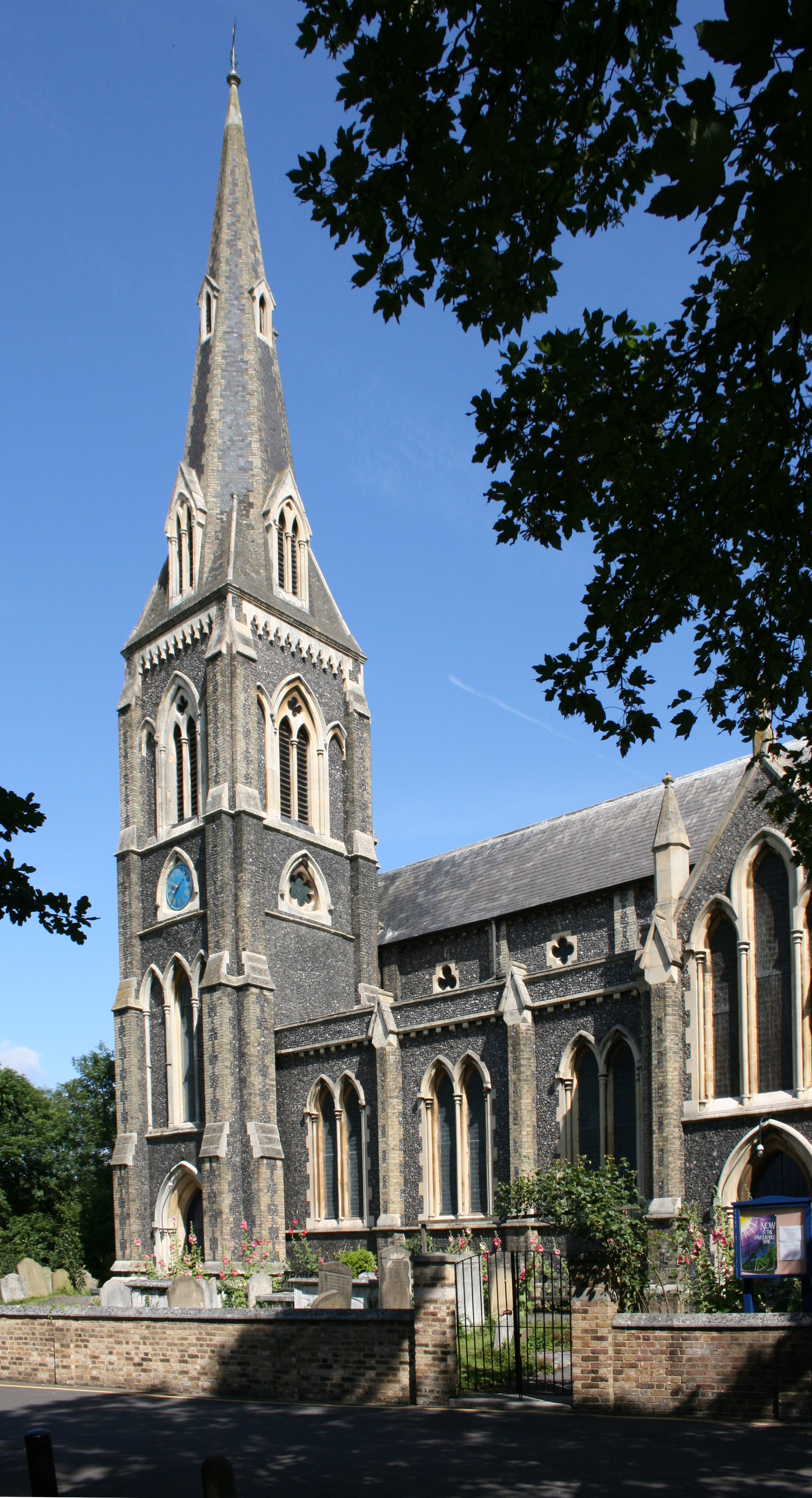

- Location within Greater London
- 51°30′49.51″N 0°20′51.4″W
- OS grid reference: TQ 147 807
- Country: England
- Denomination: Church of England
- Website: http://www.stmaryshanwell.org.uk/index.php

History
- Status: Parish church
- Founded: approx. 954 AD ?
- Founder: St. Dunstan?
- Consecrated: Present building: 27 April 1842

Architecture
- Functional status: Active
- Heritage designation: Grade II*
- Architect: George Gilbert Scott with W.B. Moffatt
- Style: Mainly Gothic Revival with some interior Georgian elements.
- Construction cost: £2,369 (Two thousand, three hundred and sixty-nine Pounds sterling)

Specifications
- Capacity: 400
- Materials: Flint-rubble and mortar, white brick quioning and stone dressings.

Administration
- Diocese: Diocese of London
- Deanery: Ealing (West)
- Parish: Hanwell

Clergy
- Rector: Andrew Dand
- Vicar: Susy Dand

St Mary's Parish Church is a Church of England church situated at the western end of Church Road in Hanwell, West London. It dates back to at least the 12th century.

== History ==
Built upon the highest point in Hanwell and providing a commanding view out over the River Brent valley, it is the perfect site for a parish church. No 'hard' archaeological evidence has been found so far, to show that any church existed here earlier than shown in written records. However, due to its commanding topographical position, which enables the distinctive broach spire to be seen from many miles away, it has been suggested that this may have been a pagan place of worship long before Christianity reached this part of the world. There is however, no evidence to support this theory. An early supporter of this hypothesis was Sir Montagu Sharpe KC DL, a local historian and a member of the Society of Antiquaries. In nearby Northolt, the parish church of St. Mary, which is also on high ground, has had much evidence found around it of past occupation by the Beaker people. Historians have further suggested that a Roman villa may have once occupied the site of that church. These two elevated sites along with nearby St. Mary's, Harrow on the Hill and Castle Bar, all being clearly visible to each other, would have been natural places for people to congregate, whatever their beliefs.

Sharpe also pointed out, other possible evidence of the parishes pre-Christian origins. The field boundaries of Hanwell, (the hedges of which, have since been mostly grubbed out), were roughly of the same measurements and orientation of the Roman 'limes' or land divisions. Even more tantalizing he observed: that at exactly the north east corner stood the gate and path of Perivale's parish church of St. Mary's. Had these hedges still been in existence today, it would have been possible to perform an accurate statistical analysis of the field lines to determine the probability against pure chance that these fields were laid out by Roman surveyors.

It is possible that the first church to be built at this place in Hanwell was in the time of St. Dunstan around 954 AD but records are sparse and inconclusive. The first firm evidence of a church here, is for the mid 12th century when it was the mother church for the ancient parish, of these parts, which in those days extended further south, down to the river Thames at what is now called New Brentford.

=== The Victorian Church ===
Despite a gallery being built in 1823 the old Georgian building became too small for the growing population. Therefore, a decision was made to replace it with a new and larger church. Architect George Gilbert Scott won the commission for the design. The Gothic style of architecture was enjoying a revival and so Scott used Gothic arches and flint walls with white bricks quoins. A notable and widely visible landmark from its high elevation, the bell tower, at the south west end, is topped with a broach spire. It was consecrated by Charles James Blomfield the Bishop of London on 27 April 1842.

This was one of Scott's early attempts at designing churches and one that he came not to be happy with; describing it later as a mass of horrors. He came to realise that it was something of a mistake not to have a chancel. However, a chancel and a second vestry (by W. Pywell) were added in 1898.

The famous painter William Frederick Yeames, who at one time was this building's churchwarden, is thought to have done the wall paintings in the chancel.

== Notable features ==
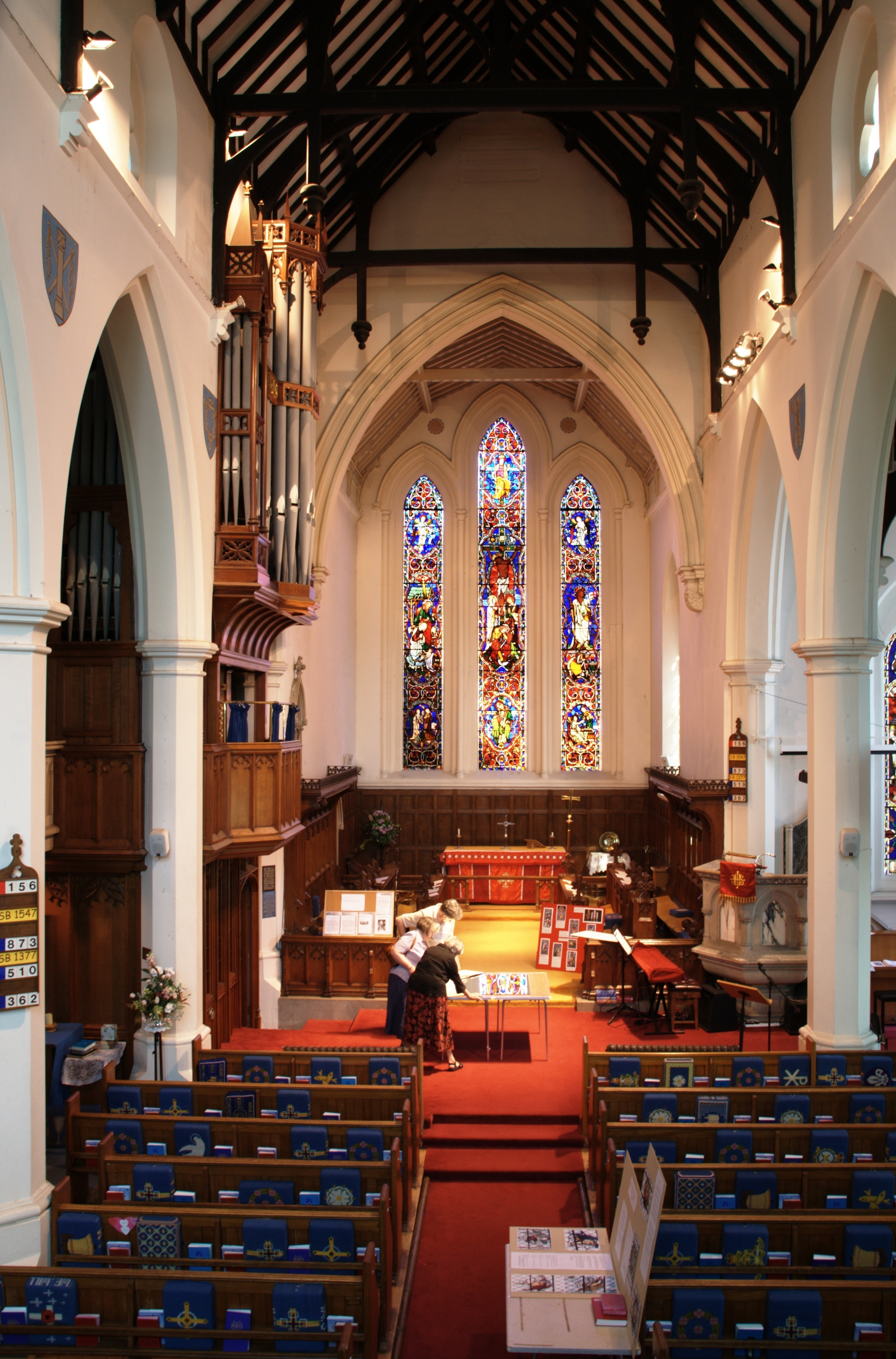
The east window

The east stained glass lancet windows are notable for their early use of very vivid, hard, bright colours. The design depicts the Nativity, Crucifixion and Resurrection.

== Monuments ==
In the graveyard is a monument to the Glasse family. English Heritage has given it a Grade II listing.

The great reformer Jonas Hanway who was buried here in the crypt on 13 September 1786 has his memorial plaque in Westminster Abbey instead.

Behind the pulpit there is a fine memorial to Margaret Emma Orde, wife to Sir John Orde, 1st Baronet. It is sculptured by van Gilder who often worked with Robert Adam.

At the western end on the south side is a bronze bust of the missionary Rev. Alec Field. He was killed on the steamship Falaba, which U-28 torpedoed in 1915. Alice Wait, a fellow missionary, has given an account of the warning, attack and sinking and of the last time she saw Rev. Fields.

Inside the church in the north east corner is a plaque to commemorate Bombardier Billy Wells. He was an English heavyweight boxer but remembered today as the man striking the gong at the start of each film released by the Rank Organisation. He was often to be seen on the local golf course and his ashes now rest in the crypt.

== Notable rectors ==
Perhaps the most famous rector was Dr. George H. Glasse. Son of the previous rector Rev. Samuel Glasse, D.D. Oxon., F.R.S., George was a great Greek and Latin scholar, writer and a man of social influence. Still surviving is the home he had built in 1809 which lies 500 ft west of the church along Church Road. It is executed in the style of cottage orné and named The Hermitage (Grade II). Nikolaus Pevsner described it thus: “a peach of an early c19 Gothic thatched cottage with two pointed windows, a quatrefoil, and an ogee arched door, all on a minute scale. Inside, an octagonal hall and reception room”. Tragically, four years after his second marriage, he found himself in dire financial straits. These troubles were thought to have weighed so heavily upon him, that whilst his mind was deranged with worry, he hanged himself at an inn in London on 30 October 1809.

Rev. Derwent Coleridge (instituted 7 March 1864) was also a distinguished scholar and author. His father was Samuel Taylor Coleridge who was one of the Lake poets. In order to meet the spiritual needs of the growing population of the parish he established St. Mark's Church on the corner of Green Lane and the Lower Boston Road. This building still stands but has since been converted into flats.

In latter years another well-known rector was Fred Secombe (brother of Harry Secombe). He arrived 9 March 1969. By the time of his departure he had already been mentioned on several national news reports. After leaving and moving back to Wales, he became a prolific author. John Weeks was then here in the 1980s.

In more recent times, Matthew Grayshon served as the rector for 23 years before becoming the vicar of St Mary's Church Amport in Winchester.

The current incumbent rector is Rev. Andrew Dand who joined St Mary's in June 2017.

== Film location ==
St Mary's has the advantage of having no passing traffic which allows filming uninterrupted by traffic noise. The following have been filmed there:

- Staggered (1994): Starred Martin Clunes as a man late for his own wedding. St Mary's was used for most of the church shots.
- Shine on Harvey Moon (1993) for ITV television: This was a period drama series set in the 1940s. The funeral sequences were also filmed at St Mary's.
- Peep Show (2007): In the sixth episode of Season 4 of this British show, two of the main characters celebrate their marriage in St Mary's.
- Not Going Out (2009, 2014): Two weddings in this programme were filmed at St. Mary's.
- Carry On Constable (1960): Comedy film
