= Charles & Diana: A Royal Love Story =

1982 American made-for-TV film

- Genre: Drama; romance
- Based on: Wedding of Prince Charles and Lady Diana Spencer
- Written by: John McGreevy
- Directed by: James Goldstone
- Starring: David Robb; Caroline Bliss
- Music by: John Addison
- Country of origin: United States
- Original language: English

Production
- Executive producer: Edward S. Feldman
- Producer: Clyde Phillips
- Cinematography: Ted Moore
- Editors: Edward A. Biery; John Troppeler
- Running time: 95 minutes
- Production companies: Edward S. Feldman Company; St. Lorraine Productions

Original release
- Network: ABC
- Release: September 17, 1982

Charles & Diana: A Royal Love Story is a 1982 American made-for-television biographical drama film that depicts the wedding of Prince Charles and Lady Diana Spencer. The film was directed by James Goldstone and starred David Robb, Caroline Bliss, Christopher Lee, Rod Taylor, Margaret Tyzack and Mona Washbourne. It originally aired September 17, 1982, on ABC.

== Plot ==
The film is about the courtship of Prince Charles and Lady Diana Spencer. Charles is shown to be under intense pressure by his family and the press to find a suitable bride. Before his death in a bomb explosion, Charles' granduncle, Lord Mountbatten, tells him that he should find a wife. Lady Diana Spencer, who is already in love with Charles, starts to share a flat with her friends in London and begins working at a kindergarten. Due to her friendship with Charles' brother, Prince Andrew, Diana enjoys a close relationship with the Royal Family. She soon catches Charles' eye and the two become romantically involved. Despite constant intrusion by the press, Diana appears to be unbothered and the courtship progresses. Charles eventually proposes, and Diana accepts his proposal. The two get married in a royal wedding ceremony.

== Cast ==
- David Robb - Charles, Prince of Wales
- Caroline Bliss - Lady Diana Spencer
- Christopher Lee - Prince Philip, Duke of Edinburgh
- Rod Taylor - Edward Adeane
- Margaret Tyzack - Queen Elizabeth II
- Mona Washbourne - Queen Elizabeth the Queen Mother
- Charles Gray - John Spencer, 8th Earl Spencer
- David Langton - Louis Mountbatten, 1st Earl Mountbatten of Burma
- Susan Spencer - Lady Sarah Spencer
- Jeremy Clyde - Andrew Parker Bowles
- Jo Ross - Camilla Parker Bowles
- Daniel Chatto - Prince Andrew
- Patrick Bailey - Prince Edward
- Shelagh MacLeod - Carolyn Pride
- Jenifer Landor - Virginia Pitman
- Caroline Goodall - Ann Bolton
- Shirley Cassedy - Amanda Knatchbull
- Julia St John - Jane Ward

== Reception ==
The movie debuted on United States television on the ABC network on Friday, September 17, 1982, and was the 28th most watched show in America in that week. It was beaten by CBS's The Royal Romance of Charles and Diana, which became the most watched prime-time television show of the next week, with a 24.0 Nielsen rating and 37 share.

== Production ==
The movie was filmed in Kensington and Westminster.

The fact that the ABC and CBS films debuted three days apart was not a coincidence. CBS had planned to show Royal Romance in December as a Hallmark-sponsored pre-Christmas film, but then moved the air date back to September, even before the official start of the new ratings season. ABC then jumped their movie ahead of CBS, so late in the game that TV Guide did not list it. When one reviewer asked to get a preview of either movie, he was told in one case "Are you kidding? They're still gluing the tape together."
