= List of Insektors episodes =

This is a list of Insektors episodes.

== Season 1 (1994) ==
#	Episode name in French	Episode name in North America	Episode name in UK	Description
1	La guitare à Kouleurs	The Kolor Guitar	The MusiKal Kolour Gun	The Kruds/Yuks have stolen Flynn's/Fulgor's amazing Musical Colour Gun and he needs it for the Verigreen's/Joyce's rock concerts. He sets out for Krud City to find it.
2	Des fleurs pour BaKraKra	Flowers for Bakrakra	Flowers for Katheter	It is Queen Katheter's/Bakrakra's birthday and her son Prince Max/Acylius's has bought her a bunch of flowers. What they do not realise is that they are Verigreen's/Joyce's fastest growing flowers and threaten to overgrow the whole Krud/Yuk city.
3	Koa la grenouille	Koa the Frog	FrogbuKket	The Verigreens/Joyce's Great Prism is sick, and only pollen from the rare Prismaflora can save it. That is when efforts to find some pollen are hampered by a plague of giant mechanical frogs.
4	Au feu les jonKilles	Daffodil Kraze	The ResKue	The Kruds/Yuks have launched Operation Daffodil to steal wood for their boiler and during the raid Flynn/Fulgor is captured. Alex/Aeila sets out to rescue him and blow up the Krud/Yuk boiler.
5	EsKapade	The Eskape	The EsKape	Prince Max/Acylius is trying to escape the dark world again and crashes near the flowered city. Alex/Aeila finds him and mistakes him for a Verigreen/Joyce.
6	Planète Karbone	Planet Karbon	The BlaKk Planet	The Queen thinks that Max/Acylius has been kidnapped by the Verigreens/Joyces and sends in the army to get him back.
7	Koléoptère	The Koleopter	The Daffodil Kollector	Synapse/Teknocratus has invented a flying fortress to collect daffodil wood out of the reach of the Verigreens/Joyces.
8	Katerpilar	Katerpillar	The MeKhanical Digger	Synapse/Teknocratus has invented a tunnelling machine to steal daffodil wood and conquer the flowered city. Flynn/Fulgor decides to stop his dastardly plan, but he is armed with magnet.
9	Troglodyte Rock	Troglodyte Rock	The Prince of RoKk	The Verigreens/Joyces are playing loud music. Wasabi/Lukanus and Fugg/Kretinus overhear, and like true Kruds/Yuks, kidnapped the Verigreens/Joyces to keep them quiet. Prince Max/Acylius decides to help them to escape the dungeon.
10	Les Detrakeurs du Ciel	The Sky Breakers	The Weather ForeKast	In another attempt to keep the Queen warm, Synapse/Teknocratus invents a machine that melts clouds, but it causes a drought and snow, Meanwhile Godfrey/Pyro takes up the rain and sun dancing.
11	La Nuit Elektrik	Electrik Night	Klose EnKounters	The Verigreens/Joyces always enjoy the annual night of the fireflies. The Kruds/Yuks see the glow above The Flower city and investigate. They kidnap Elmo/Spotty and suggest a little technological research into his glowing body.
12	Le Pont de la Konkorde	Konkord Bridge	The DiplomatiK Bridge	Draffsack/Krabo seemingly wants to make peace with the Verigreens/Joyces by building a bridge between the two cities, but it is a trick in which he wants to build a bridge for his invading army, However, Fylnn/Fulgor was too clever for Draffsack/Krabo's scheme and sets up a counter plot for it.
13	Les Sekrets du Grand Artificier	Great Pyro's Sekrets	Godfrey's SeKret	To everyone's surprise Godfrey/Pyro reveals that Peg/Gallopus is a Krud/Yuk invention. Flynn/Fulgor and Max/Acylius breaks into the Krud/Yuk Central Library to find Peg's/Gallopus's instruction manual. In it, they also find a page from a diary which reveals more about Flynn's/Fulgor's past that he wants to know.

== Season 2 (1995) ==
#	Episode name in French	Episode name in North America	Episode name in UK	Description
14	Grosse Kolere	Fulgor's Kwest	Krud Konfessions	Flynn/Fulgor travels to the Krud/Yuk city in search of his long lost father and manages to find his old laboratory. Desperate for more information he chases Draffsack/Krabo.
15	Koup de Kafard	Krabo's Kase	SiKk at Heart	Draffsack/Krabo is down in the dumps and even insults from Fugg/Kretinus can't shake him out of it. In the flower City, Flynn/Fulgor is also unhappy and nothing Godfrey/Pyro and the others can do will cheer him up.
16	Kui-Kui	Bird Kalls	If ChiKkens Kould Fly	Synapse/Teknocractus invents the Bifocal, Avian Ornithoper and with Greeb/Kaboche and Drumsturdy/Krabouic the plan seemingly goes well.
17	Le Kadeau	Lukanus' Koncert	The Kage	Wasabi/Lukanus sets out on a butterfly hunt to impress the Queen and catches an unimpressed Alex/Aeila.
18	La Kourse	Katch Me If You Kan	AthletiKs	Flynn/Fulgor becomes a prisoner by the Kruds/Yuks. However, He challenges Drumsturdy/Krabouic to a race. The first prize is freedom while the runner-up gets a week in the Krud-O-Pod/The Dark Box.
19	Kataklysme	Kataklysm	Komet	Most of The Kruds/Yuks are not happy as they are forced to work with the Verigreens/Joyces in order to destroy a comet which is threatening to smash into the Black Planet/Planet Karbon.
20	Suksession	Sukcession	Ruling Klasses	Draffsack/Krabo decides to educate Prince Max/Acylius in the arts of ruling: tyranny, lying and generally not being nice. Max/Acylius however is not too keen and renounces his claim to the throne.
21	Koupable	Kourt Kase	AKKused	A courtroom drama unfolds when Flynn/Fulgor is charged with colouring one Corporal Stanley Churchill Elvis Greeb/Kaboche. Meanwhile, Prince Max/Acylius and Alex/Aeila investigate the mystery behind the incident in order to clear Flynn's/Fulgor's name.
22	Kontagion	It's Katching	EpidemiK	The Verigreens/Joyces are dropping like flies, brought low by a disease which affects their wing muscles. Draffsack/Krabo, seizing his chance, marches into the Flowered City unchallenged, but soon the Kruds/Yuks begins to notice strange things happening to their voices.
23	Rekolte	The Kure	The Kure	The Kruds/Yuks begins a desperate search for a cure for their embarrassing vocal problem. Meanwhile, Prince Max/Acylius and Fulgor are trying to turn a Krud war machine into a pollen harvester and Alex/Aeila is working on the medicine for The Verigreens/Joyces and Kruds/Yuks.
24	Kalkulator	Kalkulator	Sparkie and Ko	Synapse/Teknocratus computerized Krud/Yuk City and automated the collection of flower wood. Flynn/Fulgor must enter Krud/Yuk City to try and stop this devastation.
25	Spektre	Spektre	A SpeKtre Kalls	The Krud/Yuk City is sent into a panic by the appearance of a ghost. Draffsack/Krabo, who has a terrible bout of hiccups, accuses Max/Acylius of being the saboteur of the Krud/Yuk machines. So, Max/Acylius and Fugg/Kretinus searched for the real saboteur behind these incidents.
26	Katakombs	Katakombs	The Kave	Max/Acylius informs Flynn/Fulgor that his father is alive. He takes him to a cave far beneath the city in the hopes of reuniting them. Draffsack/Krabo has other plans and sends the troops after them.

== Specials ==
#	Episode name in French	Episode name in North America	Episode name in UK	Description
SP	Pas De Kadeaux Pour Noel	No Presents for Khristmas (name translation only)	No Presents for Khristmas (name translation only)	Prince Max/Acylius discovered a book about Christmas in the archives and thought up an idea that Kruds/Yuks & Verigreens/Joyces should celebrate this special event together. However, Draffsack/Krabo made a dastardly plot to surprise the Verigreens/Joyces with the presents. But, once more Fylnn/Fulgor made sure that his scheme backfired.
SP	Insektors: The Making Of	Insektors: The Making Of (French only)	Insektors: The Making Of (French only)	Fantôme animation studio sets up a tour of behind the scenes with their TV show.
SP	Insektors The Game	Insektors The Game	Insektors The Game	Jérémy prefers to play "Insektor the game" rather than do his homework, but his mom watches.
