= Not Alone (film) =

Upcoming animated film

- Teaser poster
- Directed by: Eric Guillon; Claire Dodgson; Jonathan del Val
- Produced by: Chris Meledandri
- Starring: Timothée Chalamet; Selena Gomez; Brett Goldstein; Rob Brydon; Jamie Demetriou; Diane Morgan; Allison Janney; Lamorne Morris
- Production companies: Universal Pictures; Illumination
- Distributed by: Universal Pictures
- Release date: April 16, 2027
- Country: United States
- Language: English

Not Alone is an upcoming American animated science fiction romantic comedy film directed by Eric Guillon, Claire Dodgson (in her directorial debut), and Jonathan del Val. Produced by Universal Pictures and Illumination, the film will star the voices of Timothée Chalamet and Selena Gomez as two clueless romantics making the world's very first-ever plant-powered rocket, only to encounter three tiny aliens stranded on Earth who seek a way back home while evading an intergalactic officer. Among the supporting cast are Brett Goldstein, Rob Brydon, Jamie Demetriou, Diane Morgan, Allison Janney, and Lamorne Morris.

Not Alone was announced at the 2026 Annecy International Animation Film Festival, with the cast and crew attached, and will be Illumination's first original film since Migration (2023), as Chris Meledandri describes this film made by "a homegrown directing team" from Guillon, Dodgson, and Del Val, in an effort to expand into original properties beyond a catalogue of mostly established ones.

Not Alone will be theatrically released in the United States on April 16, 2027, by Universal Pictures.

== Premise ==
An introverted rocket mechanic, Joe, and a smart astro-botanist, Fran, are tasked at Space Burst with devising the very first-ever plant-fueled rocket. They develop immediate chemistry, though both lack romantic competence. Joe, who lives a secluded, solitary lifestyle, finds himself sheltering three small, unruly, adorable aliens known as the fugitives from Planet Kleb: Dunk, Welly, and Shirm. The alien trio is on an interstellar escape from the overzealous Officer Zandro, and deduce that the rocket will safely get them home from the Earth. Now, Joe must struggle to get the alien trio home to Planet Kleb and to win the emotions of Fran before it's far too late.

== Voice cast ==
- Timothée Chalamet as Joe
- Selena Gomez as Fran
- Brett Goldstein as Officer Zandro
- Rob Brydon as Dunk
- Jamie Demetriou as Shirm
- Diane Morgan as Welly

Additionally, Allison Janney and Lamorne Morris have been cast in undisclosed roles.

== Production ==
=== Development ===
On June 21, 2026, Timothée Chalamet was reported to be voicing the main character of the then-untitled production; described as a "high-brow" romantic comedy with emotional depth, the tone was compared to Pixar's Up (2009), and would explore "prestige-driven" storytelling while still maintaining a family audience from Illumination. Chalamet had teased a film announcement that day on his Instagram story, hinting at it with a rocket emoji, and that the news would drop the following day, June 22, where the film's title, synopsis, and teaser poster were officially unveiled at the 2026 Annecy International Animation Film Festival, while Chalamet's involvement and role were officially confirmed.

Illumination veterans Eric Guillon, Claire Dodgson, and Jonathan Del Val were announced as directors as Chris Meledandri, founder and CEO of Illumination, who also will produce the original film, described the trio as "a homegrown directing team". As alumni of the studio, each director spent years working in their respective fields of design, editing, and animation. Additionally, Guillon co-directed Despicable Me 3 (2017), while Del Val co-directed The Secret Life of Pets 2 (2019) and Minions: The Rise of Gru (2022), and directed the short film, Mooned (2023). Joy Poirel, co-president of production at Illumination Studios Paris and executive producer on Migration (2023), alongside Richard Curtis and David Distenfeld serve as executive producers.

=== Casting ===
Along with the film's unveiling at Annecy and Chalamet's involvement, Selena Gomez, Brett Goldstein, Rob Brydon, Jamie Demetriou, and Diane Morgan were also announced in their respective roles, with the additions of Allison Janney and Lamorne Morris. Gomez previously voiced Helga in Blue Sky Studios' Horton Hears a Who! (2008), which Meledandri executive-produced. The film also marks Janney's fourth collaboration with Illumination, having already voiced Madge Nelson in Minions and the short film Binky Nelson Unpacified (both 2015), as well as Olivia in Minions & Monsters (2026); due to Meledandri and Janney being friends while attending the Hotchkiss School.

== Marketing ==
The first teaser trailer was released on June 30, 2026, but in contrast on using David Bowie's "Space Oddity", Drew Taylor of TheWrap found the teaser "really dreamy and charming" and compared the choice of music to that of Pixar's Lightyear (2022), whose teaser utilized another Bowie song; "Starman".

== Release ==
On January 10, 2025, Universal Pictures first disclosed the project's then-nameless existence while announcing its delay from March 19, 2027, then to June 30, 2027. The slot was initially filled by Minions & Monsters, which was subsequently moved to July 1, 2026. (Note: Following the release of Despicable Me 4 (2024), the series surpassed $5 billion worldwide to become the highest-grossing animated franchise of all time. Universal subsequently pushed up Minions & Monsters from its original summer slot to July 1, 2026, swapping positions with DreamWorks Animation's Shrek 5 to capitalize on the franchise's traditional holiday and anniversary windows.) On August 11, 2025, Not Alone was pushed forward to its current release, April 16, 2027, which Universal originally scheduled for another Illumination film. DreamWorks Animation's Shrek 5 would take over the June 30 slot to further capitalize on the traditional summer window of the studio's Shrek franchise.

As part of Universal's long-term deal with Netflix for its animated films, Not Alone will stream in the United States on Peacock for the first four months of its pay-TV window. It will then move to Netflix for the next ten months, before returning to Peacock for an additional four months.
