= Highway (TV series) =

British television religious series

- Presented by: Harry Secombe
- Country of origin: United Kingdom
- Original language: English
- No. of series: 12

Production
- Executive producer: Bill Ward
- Running time: 30-35 mins

Original release
- Network: ITV
- Release: 23 October 1983 – 1 August 1993

Highway was a religious British television series, broadcast from 23 October 1983 until 1 August 1993. Presented by Harry Secombe, the show was a mixture of hymns and chat from various locations across Britain, produced by their respective regional ITV franchise holders. The programme was administered by Tyne Tees Television in Newcastle upon Tyne. Unusually, no regional ident was used at the beginning of the programme, a generic "ITV Presents" caption being used instead.

Guests sang religious songs, gave readings or talked about their lifestyles and spiritual feelings.

The series was broadcast on Sunday evenings. The final series was moved to Sunday afternoons. Highway was replaced by Sunday Morning with Secombe in which he would broadcast from the venue of the following Morning Worship service.

In the late 1990s, Secombe often presented the BBC programme Songs of Praise, which until 1992 competed directly against Highway in the Sunday evening slot.
