= The Painter's Daughters Chasing a Butterfly =

1756 painting by Thomas Gainsborough

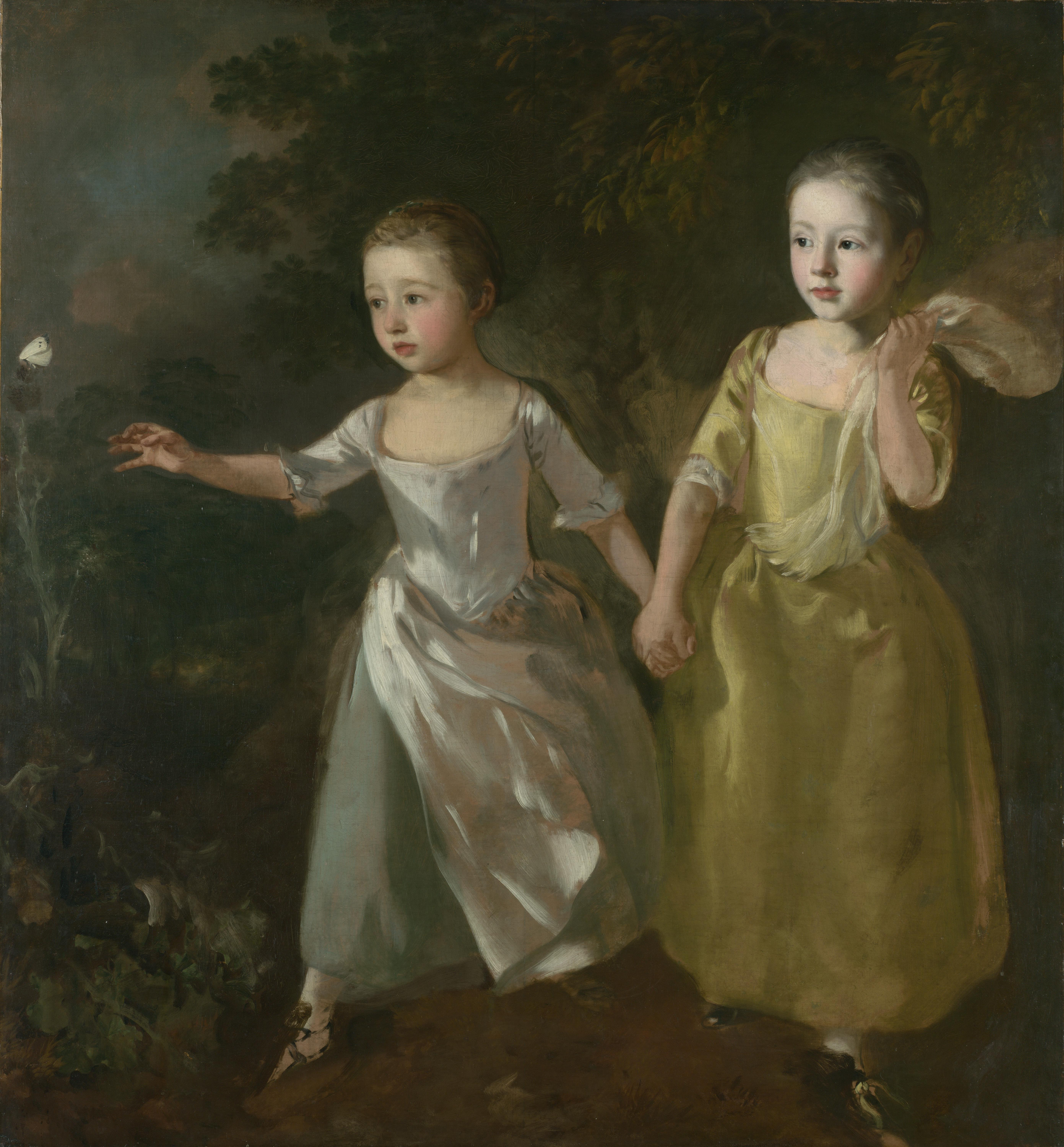
- Artist: Thomas Gainsborough
- Year: 1756
- Medium: Oil on canvas
- Dimensions: 113.5 cm × 105 cm (44.7 in × 41 in)
- Location: National Gallery, London

The Painter's Daughters Chasing a Butterfly is an oil on canvas painting by Thomas Gainsborough, from 1756. It is held in the National Gallery, in London.

== Analysis ==
The painting depicts the artists daughters, Mary ("Molly", 31 January 1750 - 2 July 1826) and Margaret ("Peggy", 19 August 1751 - 18 December 1820) Gainsborough, engaging in the titular activity.

The two girls are depicted during a butterfly hunt, standing hand in hand in a forest. The composition shows Margaret, the younger sister, extending her right arm towards a small white butterfly that has landed on a thistle. In the other half of the painting, on the right, her sister Mary holds the apron of her dress closed over her shoulder, like a makeshift net.

The younger daughter reaching to grab the butterfly represents the fragility of life while the elder daughter's apprehensive facial expression reveals her edging towards maturity.

The Painter's Daughters Chasing a Butterfly proved to be a pivotal moment in Gainsborough's artistry as Jonathan Jones writes that "[it] was one of the first works in which Gainsborough developed from his early, Dutch-realist manner to the exuberant scale of his later portraits".
