= Fred Secombe =

British writer (1918–2016)

Rev. Frederick Thomas Secombe (31 December 1918 – 9 December 2016) was a Welsh Anglican clergyman and author, best known as the older brother of Harry Secombe.

Born in Swansea, Secombe was named after his father, and was a graduate of St David's College, Lampeter. An ordained deacon and priest in The Church in Wales, he served his first assistant curacy in South Wales, later as a vicar. He later moved to St. Mary's Church, Hanwell, as rector, in West London and was appointed prebendary of St Paul's Cathedral, London. He was the author of ten humorous books based on his experiences as a vicar in South Wales. Secombe encouraged Michael Bentine to create Potty Time, as therapy after the death of Bentine's son in an aeroplane crash.

Secombe died on 9 December 2016, aged 97.

== Novels ==
- How Green was my Curate (1989)
- A Curate for all Seasons (1990)
- Goodbye Curate (1992)
- Hello Vicar! (1994)
- A Comedy of Clerical Errors (1995)
- The Crowning Glory (1996)
- Pastures New (1997)
- The Changing Scenes of Life (1998)
- Mr. Rural Dean (2000)
- Two Vandals and a Wedding (2001)
