= Fantôme (studio) =

French animation studio

- Founded: 1985
- Founders: Georges Lacroix
- Defunct: 1999
- Fate: Acquired and folded into Neurones
- Website: awn.com/fantome/ (archived 12/01/1998)

Fantôme was a French animation studio which produced arguably the first regular CG animated TV series, Insektors in 1994. The company shut down in late 1999.

== Programs ==
=== TV shows ===
- Insektors
- Tales from the Cryptkeeper (season 3)
