= Insektors =

- The front cover to an Insektors DVD
- Genre: Family comedy
- Created by: Studio Fantome
- Written by: Eric Rondeaux; Véronique Herbaut
- Directed by: Georges LaCroix; Renato LaCroix
- Country of origin: France
- Original language: French
- No. of seasons: 2
- No. of episodes: 26 (list of episodes)

Production
- Running time: 12 minutes
- Production companies: Fantome Animation; Ellipse Programme; Medialab Studio D.A. Neurones; Erasmus+ Creative Europe Media

Original release
- Network: Canal+ France 3 RTBF 1
- Release: 15 January 1994 – 30 December 1995

Insektors (stylized as InseKtorS) is a 1994 French animated television series set on a planet inhabited by two factions of anthropomorphic insects: one colorful and peace-loving, the other monochromatic and aggressive.

Made by a small studio, Fantôme in France, it was one of the earliest computer-animated series alongside VeggieTales and ReBoot. The series won 30 awards, including a 1994 "Children and Young People" Emmy Award.

In 2023, Piko Interactive acquired rights to the show.

== Production and dubbing ==
Fantôme was formed by Renato, Georges Lacroix and Jean-Yves Grall in 1985. It released Les fables géométriques (Geometric Fables), the first computer-animated television series. Renato came up with the idea for Insektors in 1991, when Les fables géométriques was almost done airing. Animation director Gilbert Louet said that the team wanted to make something more ambitious, with a more serious story and larger scope. A pilot and making of documentary was released in 1992.

Fantôme hired script writer Eric Rondeaux at the recommendation of animation studio Ellipse Programme, with whom Rondeaux had worked on a 1991 adaptation of The Adventures of Tintin. Marc Perrier and Veronique Herbaut were later hired as additional script writers. The studio used Silicon Graphics hardware for its animations. Crew recalled the animation process as grueling; the studio wanted two to five seconds of animation to be done per person each day. For the second season, the series used motion capture on the direction of Canal+, who had just bought a production company that specialized in the technique.

A pilot episode was shot, and there were two 13-episode seasons and a few special episodes including a 1996 Christmas episode. The series was dubbed into two English language releases; one for North America, and one for the UK. The North American version was recorded in Paris. It was first aired on Canadian television on YTV. For the UK version, the script was re-written; characters had different names and different dialogue was used. Jokes and references specific to British/English culture were also incorporated.

== Setting ==
The series takes place on the planet Karbon/Krud, though the UK dub does include references to locations on Earth. The episode "Planet Karbon/The Black Planet" reveals that Karbon/Krud was originally a dark, colorless rock inhabited by a single race of insects called the Yuks/Kruds, who survived the planet's hostile environment by burrowing deep into it for coal. At one point, a prism-shaped meteor hit the planet and nourished the site on which it landed with color and energy, resulting in a flower-filled paradise.

A few of the Yuks/Kruds colonized the area and evolved colors of their own, renaming themselves Joyces/Verigreens. They venerated the Prism and built a high altar upon it. The Yuks/Kruds who chose to stick to their original lives continued mining for coal till they gradually exhausted their supplies. The animosity between the two insect civilizations began when a violent Yuk/Krud known as King Bakrako/Katheter I came up with the solution of using the Joyce's/Verigreen's flower stalks as substitute fuel sources. Gradually, all memory of the two civilizations once being the same people was lost, and they have been enemies ever since.

== Characters ==
The French name is given first followed by the British name in brackets, and if there is an alternate North American name, this is indicated by a slash.

=== Joyces ===
Joyces (Verigreens) are colorful, cheerful insects and offshoots of the Yuk/Krud civilization who broke away from their dark cousins upon the arrival of the Great Prism which nourished the site where it landed, resulting in the creation of Flower City. They are peaceful people who devote their lives to merrymaking and protecting the Great Prism from harm. Joyce citizens who are not main characters resemble bees.

Fulgor (Flynn)

Original voice: Daniel Lafourcade
David Gasman (US dub)
Teddy Kempner (UK dub)
A walking stick born a Yuk/Krud, but adopted by the Joyces/Verigreens from a young age. Armed with the mighty Kolour Guitar/Musical Colour Gun - an electric guitar that fires blasts of colorful pollen - he is the brave, and sometimes reckless, champion in the fight against the Yuks/Kruds.

Aelia (Alex)

Original voice: Raphaële Moutier
Karen Strassman (US dub)
Caroline Bliss (UK dub)
A butterfly, she is the daughter of the Joyce/Verigreen leader and adopted sister of Fulgor/Flynn. She tends to the Great Prism and assists her father in his scientific explorations. She has romantic feelings for Acylius/Max.

Le Grand Artificier/The Great Pyro (Godfrey)

Original Voice: Christian Alers
Christian Erickson (US dub)
Andy Secombe (UK dub)
A butterfly, he is the slightly eccentric leader of the Joyces/Verigreens, the biological father of Aelia/Alex and adoptive father of Fulgor/Flynn. He is talented as a scientist and mystic.

Daltonio (Bentley)

A greenfly and the Great Pyro's/Godfrey's main assistant, he is enthusiastic about colourful and musical festivities, but is colour blind and he can't tell the difference between blue and red.

Gallopus (Peg)

A mechanical horse-like robot, he was originally created by Eurekas/Magus. He is Fulgor's/Flynn's steed and close confidante, but unable to speak outside of honks and squeaks. In the UK dub, Peg is female.

Spotty (Elmo)

Another machine like Gallopus/Peg, he is a small flier. He has a large spotlight in his stomach to illuminate dark areas.

=== Beurks/Yuks ===
Beurks/Yuks (Kruds) are monochromatic insects that live in a rotting tree stump in a swamp - they continually try to conquer the Flower City in the name of their Queen, namely for the fuel source the flowers provide. Exposure to brightly colored substances (pollen, juices from mushrooms) causes them to enter states of uninhibited laughter. Yuk soldiers that are not main characters resemble crickets, whereas Yuk citizens that are not main characters are beetles.

Reine/Queen Bakrakra (Queen Katheter III)

Original voice: Lucienne Troka
Andy Secombe (UK dub)
A praying mantis, Queen Bakrakra/Katheter the Third is the fearsome ruler of the Yuks/Kruds, and a descendant of the tyrannical King Bakrakro/Katheter the First. She is so cold-hearted that she must spend much of her time in a massive warming furnace.

Prince Acylius (Prince Maximillian)

Original voice: Alexandre Gillet
Voiced by: Teddy Kempner (UK dub)
A mantis, he is the son of Queen Bakrakra/Katheter, and heir to the Yuk/Krud throne. He has romantic feelings for Aelia/Alex. Unlike the others, he likes flowers.

Lord Krabo (Lord Draffsack)

Original voice: Daniel Lafourcade
Paul Bandey (US dub)
Neil McCaul (UK dub)
A cockroach, Krabo is grouchy, stressed, power-hungry, egotistical and something of a coward, and the Prime Minister of the Yuks/Kruds.

Lord Teknocratus (Lord Synapse)

Voiced by: Neil McCaul (UK dub)
A weevil, he is a chief engineer of the Yuks/Kruds who tirelessly creates contraptions to further their cause, or reverses the unfortunate effects of Joyce/Verigreen counter-attacks. Krabo/Draffsack is always blaming him when his inventions fail to deliver the desired results.

Lord Kretinus (Corporal Fugg)

Original voice: Jean-Claude Sachot
David Gasman (US dub)
Andy Secombe (UK dub)
A weevil, he is Lord Krabo/Draffsack and General Lukanus's/Wasabi's clumsy and slow-witted assistant, constantly trying to please his superiors.

General Lukanus (General Wasabi)

Original voice: Jean-Claude Sachot
Edward Marcus (US dub)
Neil McCaul (UK dub)
A stag beetle, he is the arrogant commander of the Yuk/Krud army, carrying out the schemes of Krabo/Draffsack and Teknocratus/Synapse, although his greatest loyalty is to Queen Bakrakra/Katheter.

Captain Krabouic and Lieutenant Kaboche (Captain Roderick Drumsturdy and Corporal Stanley Greeb)

A pair of grasshoppers that act as twin heads of security, test pilots, and commandos, Krabouic/Drumsturdy is taller and more headstrong, while Kaboche/Greeb is shorter, and more bumbling and cowardly.

The Guards (The Methane Brothers)

The two rhinoceros beetles who guard the main entrance into the Yuk/Krud castle, they are generally slow-witted, easily distracted, and quite eccentric.

Eric

A rhinoceros beetle who serves as a prison guard for Yuk/Krud City.

Protokol (Kopius)

Original voice: Christian Alers
David Gasman (US dub)
Teddy Kempner (UK dub)
A cockchafer, he is the aloof Yuk/Krud herald who announces each character's entrance (often unnecessarily). He uses what limited chances to speak he has to throw barbs at his superiors.

Eurekas (Magus)

A walking stick and introduced in the last episode of the first season, he is the biological father of Fulgor/Flynn and formerly Teknocratus's/Synapse's predecessor/colleague.

== Technology ==
The French name is given first followed by the British name in brackets, and if there is an alternate North American name, this is indicated by a slash.

=== Joyces ===
The Great Prism (The Great Prism)

A glowing multicolored cube that resides in a high tower, The Great Prism is the energy source of the Joyces/Verigreens which keeps their flower city alive. The Prism seems to be a living organism that can communicate vocally and through image projections. It is kept functioning by bathing it in the nectar of a water plant that grows in Yuk/Krud territory. It can die if it is not maintained properly.

Kolour Guitar (Musical Colour Gun)

Kolour Guitar is a handheld contraption that is used by Fulgor/Flynn. Though outwardly it resembles and plays like a guitar, violent plucking of its strings will cause it to fire blasts of colored pollen. The blasts have no effect on Joyces/Verigreens, though they entice Yuks/Kruds into fits of laughter. Strangely, a few Yuks/Kruds - such as Acylius/Maximillian, Krabo/Draffsack and probably Queen Bakrakra/Katheter - are not affected by them.

Dragonfly Squadron

The Joyce's main line of defense, these mechanical dragonflies fire blasts of pollen similar to those of the Kolour Guitar from their abdomens.

Flower Konnons

The Joyce's new weapons that only appeared in "No Presents for Khristmas" and shoot like the Kolour Guitar.

Kolour Dynamites

Kolour Dynamites are colourful explosions used by Fulgor/Flynn. When the Yuks/Kruds are harvesting flowers for heat, the dynamite explodes with multiple colors that make the Yuks/Kruds laugh.

=== Yuks ===
The Hotsy Totsy (Hypertherm)

The Hotsy Totsy is a fireplace that keeps the queen warm when the Yuks/Kruds cut down the flowers and made logs or carry sticks for heat. It also keeps the water from flooding the city and powers up The Dark Box.

The Dark Box (Krud'o'Pod)

The Krud'o'Pod is a machine that undoes the effect of the Kolour Guitar/Musical Colour Gun, reverting affected Yuks/Kruds back to their normal selves. It is implied by Lord Krabo that the Dark Box may turn Joyces into Yuks. More info about the Krud'o'Pod was in "Ruling Classes".

Hoverbikes (Bikes/Krudmobile)

Hoverbikes are mostly used by Krabouic/Drumsturdy and Kaboche/Greeb.

Kreatur

A robot-mechanic of the engineer Teknocratus, it serves as an elevator, robot welder, electro-mechanics and 'vulture of function' to the scientist. His intellectual quotient is 0.5.

Kat-Kat

Off-road vehicle, able to cross deserts, mountains, and a marsh in the summer, it is intended for the transport of Yuk/Krud troops and the invasion missions of the Joyce territory.

Koa (Frogbuckets)

Giant frog-like war machines, the Koa/Frogbuckets act as both the Yuks'/Kruds' heavy fighting forces and as material collectors. Usually controlled by two pilots, they are fully amphibious and their hulls are completely immune to Joyce/Verigreen pollen blasts. Teknocratus/Synapse insists the proper name for the machines is 'Hydroscopic Amphibious Personal Relocation Units'.

The Koleopter (The Hovermower)

Resembling a giant flying beetle, it is a two-pilot airborne resource gathering machine with a rotating blade for cutting flower stems. It has 'Fightermites' for defense against the 'Dragonflies'. It can load and unload many goods and can also act as a vacuum cleaner when collecting nectar. Teknocratus/Synapse insists its proper name is the 'Anti-Gravity Daffodil Collector'.

Sky Breaker (Cloud Clearer)

A huge laser cannon that is only seen in "The Weather ForeKast" and "No Presents for Khristmas", which was designed to cause drought, but once Teknocratus/Synapse made readjustment on it during rain, it created snow instead of drought. Annoyed, Krabo/Draffsack ended up ripping it apart, even after it created hot snow. A similar Sky Breaker/Cloud Clearer was seen in "Katiklysme/Comet" which is a fusion of Yuk/Krud and Joyce/Verigreen technology. This machine almost destroyed The Flower City.

"Tweet-Tweet" (Chicken)

Only used in "If Chickens Could Fly", the "Chicken" is bird-shaped, and was sent to steal The Great Prism. The Chicken was an airborne war machine controlled by two pilots. The first design, which flew with small propellers, crashed into a moat during a trial run. The second design had bigger propellers, but that too crashed. The third design had a jet engine on top of the fuselage, which landed it safely, though with a broken engine. It was the fourth design with wings that really took off to steal The Great Prism, but after fighting off the Joyces/Verigreens, it was sliced down the middle when it got a hold of The Great Prism. It made other appearances in two episodes, "A Spectre Kalls" and "No Presents for Khristmas".

"Kalkulator" (Sparky)

A supercomputer used in the episode of the same name and built by Synapse, the computer mechanized Krud city, where all inhabitants received a door operating PIN, and Verigreen detectors and automated defenses were placed. Draffsack himself had problems with the design, seeing as he chose the PIN 1,999,999,999. The main feature of the computer was its Auto-mated Lumberjacks. To stop the latter Flynn sneaked into the city and evaded capture as only Synapse knew that a B12 alert meant a Verigreen was in the city. The system was corrupted by a colored data card which had been hit by Flynn's color gun. After Yak/Krud city went mad Krabo/Draffsack ordered the scrapping of Kalkulator/Sparky.

"Auto-mated lumberjacks"

Minions of Sparky, these machines were virtually indestructible to Verigreen technology and able to decimate the flower forest. A unique feature was a color detector which enabled them to home in and attack Verigreen technology. This was exploited by the Verigreens who used color sprays to lure the machines over a cliff, but during the night they righted themselves and resurfaced out of the water. They were ultimately defeated with the downfall of Sparky despite their incredible success. As of the events in "No Presents for Khristmas" they were still seen working on a small scale during Krud raids, mainly to stop Verigreens hiding in their holds.

Koal Juice Guns

Koal Juice Guns are Yuk/Krud counterpart to the Kolour Guitar. Being hit by koal juice causes depression in Joyces, which may be cured by the energies of the prism. Most Yuk soldiers and most vehicles are armed with the weapons. Yuks/Kruds appeared immune to Koal juice, but it still becomes stuck to them, as it does with Joyces. Koal juice itself is a dull green substance.

Vokalizers

A walkie-talkie-like microphone that the Yuks/Kruds used after their voices were affected, it only appeared in a two-parter "It's Katching/Epidemik" and "The Kure". A similar Vokalizer was seen in "Fulgor's Kwest/Krud Konfession", possibly as a prototype.

The Watchtower

A mechanical sentinel tower attached to The Stump used by the Yuks/Kruds to keep watch over the swamp and spy on the neighboring Joyces/Verigreens.

== VHS/DVDs ==
Title	Description	Region
Insektors: The Musical Colour Gun and Other Adventures	Featuring episodes: "The Musical Colour Gun", "Flowers for Katheter", "Frogbucket", "The Rescue", "The Escape", "The Black Planet" and "The Daffodil Collector". Inside cover features information about The Verigreens and some of their technology. Note: This tape was made in the UK.	2
Insektors: The Mechanical Digger and Other Adventures	Featuring episodes: "The Mechanical Digger", "The Prince of Rock", "The Weather Forecast", "Close Encounters", "The Diplomatic Bridge" and "Godfrey's Secret". Inside cover features information about The Kruds and some of their technology. Note: This tape was made in the UK.	2
Insektors: Krud Confession and Other Adventures	Featuring episodes: "Krud Confession", "Sick at Heart", "If Chickens Could Fly", "The Cage", "Athletics", "The Comet" and "Ruling Classes". Inside cover features information about The Kruds and some of their technology. Note: This tape was made in the UK.	2
Insektors: Accused and Other Adventures	Featuring episodes: "Accused", "Epidemic", "The Cure", "Sparkie and Co", "A Spectre Calls" and "The Cave". Inside cover features information about The Verigreens and some of their technology. Note: This tape was made in the UK.	2
Insektors: Bumper Special	Featuring episodes "The Musical Colour Gun", "The Mechanical Digger" and others. Inside cover features information about some of the characters such as Flynn, Draffsack, Alex and others.	2
Insektors: Krud Kaper	Featuring episodes: "The Musical Colour Gun", "The Daffodil Collector", "The Weather Forecast", "The Diplomatic Bridge", "If Chickens Could Fly". Note: This tape was made in the UK.	2
Insektors: The Kolour Guitar	Featuring episodes: "The Kolour Guitar", "Flowers for Bakrakra", "Koa the Frog" and "Daffodil Kraze". Note: This tape was made in Australia.	2
Insektors: The Eskape	Featuring episodes: "The Eskape", "Planet Karbon", "Kolecopter" and "Katerpillar". Note: This tape was made in Australia.	2
Insektors Vol. 1	French only VHS, featuring episodes: "La guitare à kouleurs", "Des fleurs pour Bakrakra", "Koa la grenouille", and "Au feu les jonKilles".	2
Insektors Vol. 2	French only VHS, featuring episodes: "Eskapade", "Planète Karbone", "Koléoptère", "Katerpillar", "Troglodyte Rock", and "Les Detrakeurs du Ciel".	2
Insektors Vol. 3	French only VHS, featuring episodes: "La Nuit Elektrik", "Le Pont de la Konkorde", "Les Sekrets du Grand Artificier", "Grosse Kolere", "Koup de Kafard", and "Kui-Kui".	2
Insektors DVD Vol. 3	This is a French only DVD, featuring episodes: "Le Kadeau", "La Kourse", "Kataklysme", "Suksession", "Koupable", "Kontagion", "Rekolte", "Kalkulator", "Spektre", and "Katakombs". Also includes a behind the scenes video and a Christmas special. Special features include "Characters and Inventions".	2

== Cast ==
=== French version ===
- Christian Alers
- Daniel Lafourcade
- Pierre Baton
- Jacques Brunnet
- Alexandre Gillet
- Raphaelle Moutier
- Jean-Claude Sachot
- Lucienne Troka

=== CA/AU version ===
- David Gasman
- Karen Strassman
- Christian Erickson
- Bela Grushka
- Edouard Marcus
- Paul Bandey

=== UK version ===
- Teddy Kempner
- Caroline Bliss
- Andy Secombe
- Neil McCaul
