= Harry Secombe =

Welsh entertainer (1921–2001)

Sir Harry Secombe CBE
- Born: Harry Donald Secombe; 8 September 1921; St Thomas, Swansea, Wales
- Died: 11 April 2001 (aged 79); Guildford, Surrey, England
- Resting place: Christ Church, Shamley Green, Surrey, England
- Education: Dynevor School, Swansea
- Occupations: Actor; comedian; singer; presenter
- Years active: 1946–2001
- Television: The Goon Show (Radio); The Harry Secombe Show, Secombe and Friends, Highway; Sunday Morning with Secombe
- Spouse: Myra Atherton (m. 1948)
- Children: 4; including Andy
- Relatives: Fred Secombe (brother)

Sir Harry Donald Secombe (/ˈsiːkəm/; 8 September 1921 – 11 April 2001) was a Welsh actor, comedian, singer and television presenter. Secombe was a member of the British radio comedy programme The Goon Show (1951–1960), playing many characters, most notably Neddie Seagoon. An accomplished tenor, he also appeared in musicals and films – notably as Mr Bumble in Oliver! (1968) – and, in his later years, was a presenter of television shows incorporating hymns and other devotional songs.

== Early life ==
Secombe was born in St Thomas, Swansea, the third of four children of Nellie Jane Gladys (née Davies), a shop manageress, and Frederick Ernest Secombe, a travelling salesman and office worker for a Swansea wholesale grocery business. From the age of 11 he attended Dynevor School, a state grammar school in central Swansea.

His family were regular churchgoers, belonging to the congregation of St Thomas Church. A member of the choir, from the age of 12 Secombe would perform a sketch entitled The Welsh Courtship at church socials, acting as "feed" to his sister Carol. His elder brother, Fred Secombe, became the author of several books about his experiences as an Anglican priest and rector.

== Army service ==
After leaving school in 1937, Secombe became a pay clerk at Baldwin's store. With war looming, he decided in 1938 that he would join the Territorial Army. Very short sighted, he got a friend to tell him the sight test, and then learnt it by heart. He served as a Lance Bombardier in No.132 Field Regiment of the Royal Artillery. He referred to the unit in which he served during the Second World War in the North African Campaign, Sicily, and Italy, as "The Five-Mile Snipers". While in North Africa Secombe met Spike Milligan for the first time. In Sicily he joined a concert party and developed his own comedy routines to entertain the troops.

When Secombe visited the Falkland Islands to entertain the troops after the 1982 Falklands War, his old regiment promoted him to the rank of sergeant – 37 years after he had been demobbed.

== As an entertainer ==
He made his first radio broadcast in May 1944 on a variety show aimed at the military services. Following the end of fighting in the war but prior to demobilisation, Secombe joined a pool of entertainers in Naples and formed a comedy duo with Spike Milligan.

Secombe joined the cast of the Windmill Theatre in 1946, using a routine he had developed in Italy about how people shaved. An early review said that Secombe was "an original humorist of the infectious type and is very funny in a series showing how different men shave and in an impression of a vocalist." Secombe always claimed that his ability to sing could always be counted on to save him when he bombed.

Following a regional touring career, his first break came in radio in 1951 when he was chosen as resident comedian for the Welsh series Welsh Rarebit, followed by appearances on Variety Bandbox and a regular role in Educating Archie.

Secombe met Michael Bentine at the Windmill Theatre, and he was introduced to Peter Sellers by his agent Jimmy Grafton. Together with Spike Milligan, the four wrote a comedy radio script, and Those Crazy People was commissioned and first broadcast on 28 May 1951. Produced by Dennis Main Wilson, this soon became The Goon Show and the show remained on the air until 1960. Secombe mainly played Neddie Seagoon, around whom the show's absurd plots developed. In 1955, whilst appearing on The Goon Show, Secombe was approached by the BBC to step in at short notice to take the lead in the radio comedy Hancock's Half Hour. The star of the show, Tony Hancock, had decided to take an unannounced break abroad, on the day before the live airing of the second season. Secombe appeared in the lead for the first three episodes and had a guest role in the fourth after Hancock's return. All four episodes are lost, but following the discovery of the original scripts, the episodes were rerecorded in 2017, with his son, Andrew Secombe performing the role held by his late father.

With the success of The Goon Show, Secombe developed a dual career as both a comedy actor and a singer. At the beginning of his career as an entertainer, his act would end with a joke version of the duet Sweethearts, in which he sang both baritone and falsetto parts. Trained under Italian maestro Manlio di Veroli, he emerged as a tenor and had a long list of best-selling record albums to his credit.

In 1958 he appeared in the film Jet Storm, which starred Dame Sybil Thorndike and Richard Attenborough and in the same year Secombe starred in the title role in Davy, one of Ealing Studios' last films. By this time he was invited to appear on the Royal Command Performance (1958) where he struck up a lifelong friendship with Roy Castle.

The Royal Variety Performance of 29th October 1962 (which took place in the London Palladium) included Secombe amongst its performers. He made his entrance riding a tandem with Norman Vaughan, and sang a duet with Eartha Kitt while uniformed as a Mountie. Secombe and Kitt were described in the Illustrated London News as "perhaps the outstanding performers of the evening." In the show's finale, Secombe sang "God Bless the Prince of Wales"

The power of his voice allowed Secombe to appear in many stage musicals. This included 1963's Pickwick, based on Charles Dickens's The Pickwick Papers, which gave him the no. 18 hit single "If I Ruled the World" – his later signature tune. In 1965 the show was produced on tour in the United States, where, on Broadway, he garnered a nomination for a Tony Award for Best Actor in a Musical. Secombe scored his biggest hit single in 1967 with his version of "This Is My Song", which peaked at no. 2 on the charts in March 1967 while a recording by Petula Clark, which had hit no. 1 in February, was still in the top ten. He also appeared in the musical The Four Musketeers (1967) at Drury Lane, as Mr. Bumble in Carol Reed's film of Oliver! (1968), and in the Envy segment of The Magnificent Seven Deadly Sins (1971).

He went on to star in his own television show, The Harry Secombe Show, which debuted on Christmas Day 1968 on BBC1 and ran for 31 episodes until 1973. A sketch comedy show featuring Julian Orchard as Secombe's regular sidekick, the series also featured guest appearances by fellow Goon Spike Milligan as well as leading performers such as Ronnie Barker and Arthur Lowe. Secombe later starred in similar vehicles such as Sing a Song of Secombe and ITV's Secombe with Music during the 1970s.

== Later career ==
Later in life, Secombe (whose brother Fred Secombe was a priest in the Church in Wales, part of the Anglican Communion) attracted new audiences as a presenter of religious programmes, such as the BBC's Songs of Praise and ITV's Stars on Sunday and Highway. He was also a special programming consultant to Harlech Television and hosted a Thames Television programme in 1979 entitled Cross on the Donkey's Back. In the latter half of the 1980s, Secombe personally sponsored a football team for boys aged 9–11 in the local West Sutton Little League, 'Secombes Knights'.

In 1990, he was one of a few to be honoured by a second appearance on This Is Your Life, when he was surprised by Michael Aspel at a book signing in a London branch of WH Smith. Secombe had been a subject of the show previously in March 1958 when Eamonn Andrews surprised him at the BBC Television Theatre.

== Honours ==
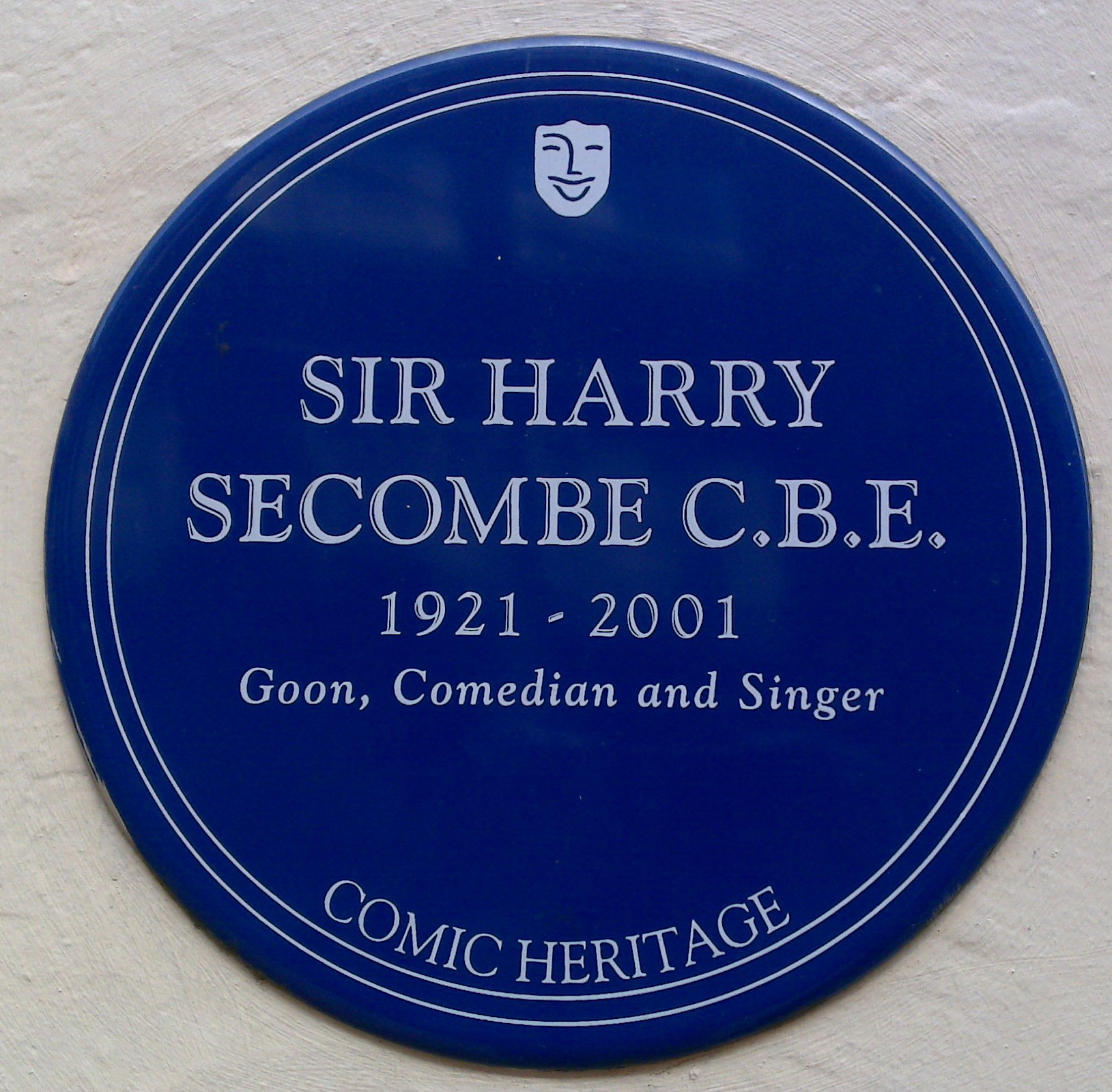
A blue plaque commemorating Secombe.

In 1963 he was appointed a Commander of the Order of the British Empire (CBE).

He was knighted in the 1981 Birthday Honours, and jokingly referred to himself as Sir Cumference (in recognition of his rotund figure). The motto he chose for his coat of arms was "GO ON", a reference to goon.

== Later life and death ==
Secombe had peritonitis in 1980. Within two years, taking advice from doctors, he had lost five stone in weight. He had a stroke in 1997 and his colon burst, from which he made a slow recovery. He was then diagnosed with prostate cancer in September 1998. Following a second stroke in 1999, he was forced to abandon his television career, but made a documentary about his condition in the hope of giving encouragement to others with the condition. Secombe had diabetes in the latter part of his life.

Secombe died on 11 April 2001 at the age of 79, from prostate cancer, in hospital in Guildford, Surrey. His ashes are interred at the parish church of Shamley Green, and a later memorial service to celebrate his life was held at Westminster Abbey on 26 October 2001. As well as family members and friends, the service was attended by Charles, Prince of Wales and representatives of Prince Philip, Duke of Edinburgh, Anne, Princess Royal, Princess Margaret, Countess of Snowdon and Prince Edward, Duke of Kent. On his tombstone is the inscription: "To know him was to love him."

At Peter Sellers's funeral in 1980, Secombe sang a hymn and Spike Milligan joked: "I hope you die before me because I don't want you singing at my funeral." After Milligan's death in 2002, a recording of Secombe singing Guide me, O Thou great Redeemer was played at Milligan's memorial service.

The Secombe Theatre in Sutton, Greater London, was named after him. He is also fondly remembered at the London Welsh Centre, where he opened the bar on St Patrick's Day (17 March) 1971.

== Family ==
Secombe met Myra Joan Atherton at the Mumbles Dance Hall in 1946. The couple were married from 1948 until his death, and had four children:

- Jennifer Secombe (died 2019), widow of actor Alex Giannini. She was her father's agent in his later years.
- Andy Secombe, a voice actor, film actor and author
- David Secombe, a writer and photographer
- Katy Secombe, an actress

Myra, Lady Secombe died on 7 February 2018, aged 93.

== Selected works ==
=== Singles ===
- "On with the Motley" (Vesti la giubba) (1955) UK #6
- "Bless This House"
- "If I Ruled the World" (1963) UK #18
- "This Is My Song" (1967) UK #2

=== Albums ===
- Sacred Songs (1962) UK #16
- Pickwick (Original Cast Album) (1965)
- Secombe's Personal Choice (1967) UK #6
- If I Ruled the World (1971) UK #17
- The Magnificent Voice of Harry Secombe (1972) AUS #14
- With a Song In My Heart (1977) AUS #24
- Captain Beaky and His Band (1977)
- Bless This House: 20 Songs of Joy (1978) UK #8, AUS #28
- This Is My Song (1983) AUS #9
- All Things Bring and Beautiful (1983) AUS #31
- Songs for Everyone (1986) AUS #43
- Highway of Life (1986) UK #45
- Count Your Blessings (1988) AUS #93
- Yours Sincerely (1991) UK #46

=== Books ===
==== Fiction ====
- Twice Brightly (1974) Robson Books ISBN 0903895234
- Welsh Fargo (1981) Robson Books ISBN 0903895870

==== Children's ====
- Katy and the Nurgla (1980) ISBN 0140311890

==== Autobiographical ====
- Goon for Lunch (1975) M. J. Hobbs ISBN 0718112830
- Goon Abroad (1982) Robson Books ISBN 0860511936
- Arias and Raspberries (1989) Robson Books ISBN 0860516245
- Strawberries and Cheam (1998) Robson Books ISBN 1861050488
- An Entertaining Life, Foreword by HRH Charles, Prince of Wales, London: Robson Books, 2001, ISBN 1-86105-471-8 Alternative ISBNs for 2004 publication: ISBN 978-1-86105-811-9; ISBN 1-86105-811-X (paperback).

=== Partial filmography ===
Year	Title	Role	Director	Co-stars	Notes
1949	Helter Skelter	Alf	Ralph Thomas		Uncredited
1951	Penny Points to Paradise	Harry Flakers	Tony Young		
1952	Down Among the Z Men	Harry Jones	Maclean Rogers		
1953	Forces' Sweetheart	Harry Llewellyn	Maclean Rogers		
1954	Svengali	Barizel	Noel Langley	Hildegard Knef, Donald Wolfit, Terence Morgan	
1957	Davy	Davy Morgan	Michael Relph	Ron Randell, Susan Shaw, Alexander Knox	
1959	Jet Storm	Binky Meadows	Cy Endfield	Richard Attenborough, Stanley Baker	
1968	Oliver!	Mr. Bumble	Carol Reed		
1969	The Bed Sitting Room	Shelter Man	Richard Lester		
1969	Pickwick	Mr. Pickwick	Terry Hughes	Roy Castle, Hattie Jacques	
1970	Doctor in Trouble	Llewellyn Wendover	Ralph Thomas		
1970	Song of Norway	Bjørnstjerne Bjørnson	Andrew L. Stone		
1971	The Magnificent Seven Deadly Sins	Stanley	Graham Stark		(segment "Envy")
1972	Sunstruck	Stanley Evans	James Gilbert		
