= Ken (given name) =

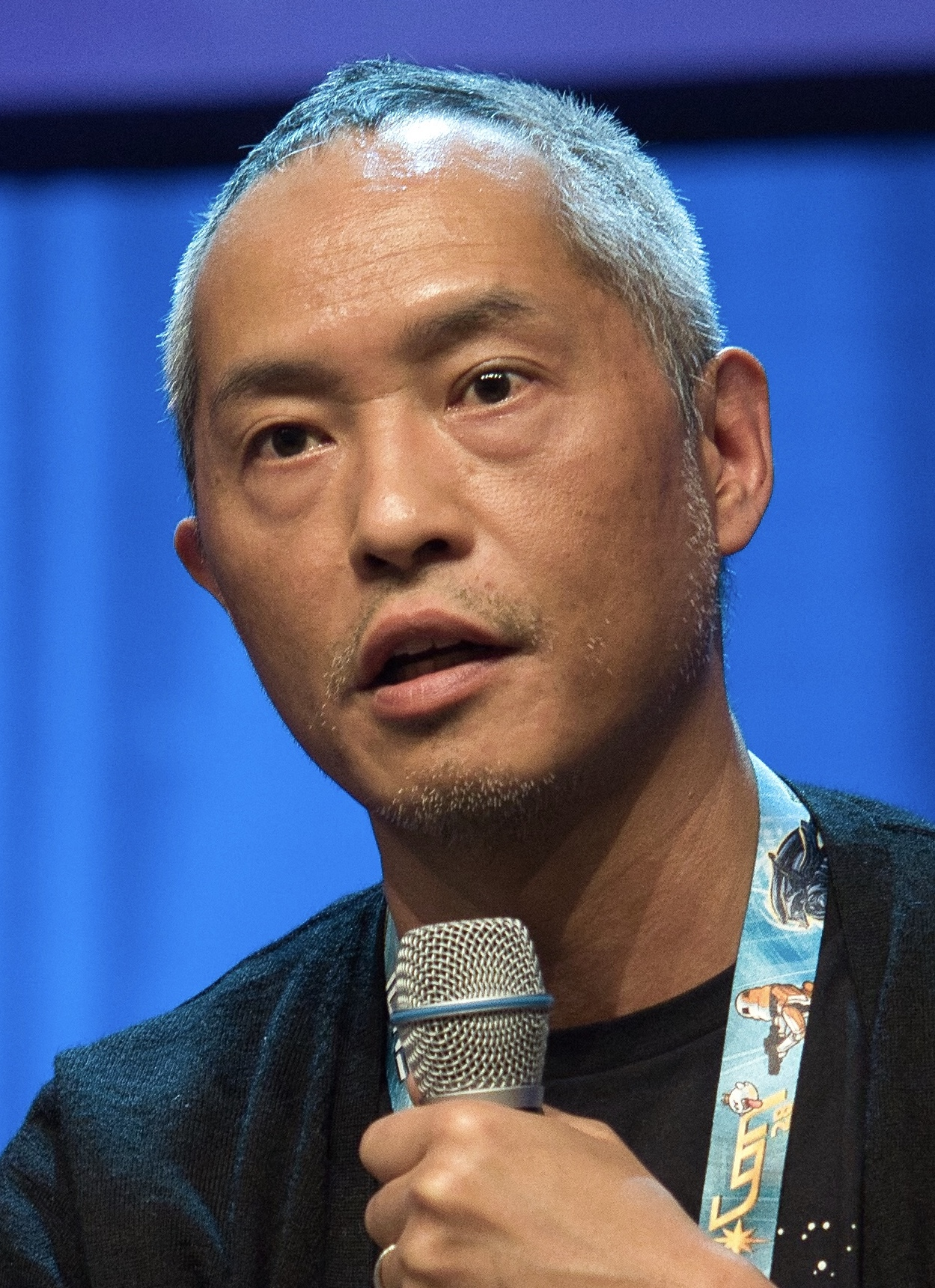
- Ken Leung in 2019
- Gender: Male
- Language: English, Japanese, Chinese

Origin
- Origin: Japanese, Scottish Gaelic, Chinese

Other names
- Nickname: Kenny
- Related names: Kenneth, Kenny, Kendrick, Kendall, Kennedy

Ken is a masculine given name of Japanese, Scottish Gaelic, or Chinese origin.

The Japanese given name is common among males. It can have many different meanings depending on the kanji used.

Ken is also a masculine given name of Scottish / Scottish Gaelic origin. It is used as a given name or as a short form of names with the letters "Ken" (like Kenneth, Kenny, Kendrick, Kendall, or Kennedy).

== People ==
- Ken (musician) (born 1968), Japanese musician and member of the bands L'Arc-en-Ciel and Sons of All Pussys
- Ken Akamatsu (赤松 健; born 1968), Japanese author
- Ken Anderson (quarterback) (born 1949), American quarterback
- Ken Anderson (wrestler) (born 1976), American professional wrestler known under the ring name Mr. Kennedy
- Ken Barrie (1933–2016), English voice actor and singer
- Ken Block (disambiguation), multiple people
- Ken Bowersox (born 1956), American astronaut
- Ken Bruce (born 1951), Scottish DJ
- Ken Bruen (1951–2025), Irish crime fiction writer
- Ken Buesseler (born 1959), American marine radiochemist
- Ken Burns (born 1953), American documentary filmmaker
- Ken Caillat (born 1946), American record producer
- Ken Caminiti (1963–2004), Major League Baseball player
- Ken Campbell (1941–2008), English writer, actor, and director
- Ken Campbell (evangelist) (1934–2006), Canadian evangelist
- Ken Carlson (born 1951), American politician
- Ken Casey, bassist of the Boston Irish punk rock group Dropkick Murphys
- Ken Chambers (1933–2021), Australian rules footballer
- Ken Chan (Filipino actor) (born 1993), Filipino actor
- Ken Christianson, California based artist and musician, with art collective Elephant Empire
- Ken Clark (actor) (1927–2009), American actor
- Ken Clouston, member of the Wyoming House of Representatives
- Ken Croken (born 1950), American politician
- Ken Davitian (born 1953), American film and TV actor
- Deng Ken (1911–2017), Chinese politician
- Ken Dodd (1927–2018), English comedian and singer
- Ken Doherty (born 1969), Irish professional snooker player, commentator and radio presenter
- Ken Dyer (1946–2010), American football player
- Ken Dryden (born 1947), Canadian politician, lawyer, businessman, author, and former NHL goaltender
- Ken Ernst (1918–1985), American cartoonist
- Ken Flax (born 1963), American Olympic hammer thrower
- Ken Follett (born 1949), British author of thrillers and historical novels
- Ken Giles (born 1990), American baseball player
- Ken Griffey Sr. (born 1950), American baseball player
- Ken Griffey Jr. (born 1969), American baseball player
- Ken Ham (born 1951), Australian-born American creationist
- Ken Harrelson (born 1941), Major League Baseball player and broadcaster
- Ken Harris (1898–1982), American animator
- Ken Hendricks (1941–2007), American businessman, president of Hendricks Group
- Ken Hirai (平井 堅; born 1972), J-pop singer known for the hit songs "Hitomi wo Tojite" and "POP STAR"
- Ken Hoang (born 1985), American professional electronic sports player
- Ken Holtzman (born 1945), American Major League Baseball pitcher
- Ken Hon, American geologist and head of Hawaiian Volcano Observatory
- Ken Horiuchi (堀内 健; born 1969), Japanese comedian
- Ken Hughes (1922–2001), British writer and director of films, including Chitty Chitty Bang Bang
- Ken Jacobs (1933–2025), American experimental filmmaker
- Ken Jennings (born 1974), American; contestant, executive producer and host of the game show Jeopardy!
- Ken Jeong (born 1969), American comedian, actor and former physician
- Ken Kelley (American football) (born 1960), American football player
- Ken Kelley (journalist) (1949–2008), American journalist and publisher
- Ken Keltner (1916–1991), American baseball player
- Ken Kesey (1935–2001), American novelist, author of One Flew Over the Cuckoo's Nest
- Ken Kirby, Canadian-born actor and screenwriter
- Ken Klippenstein, American journalist
- Ken Kojima (born 1999), Japanese idol, actor, and fashion model
- Ken Kratz (born 1960–61), American lawyer, former district attorney of Calumet County, Wisconsin
- Ken Kutaragi (born 1950), Japanese businessman, president and CEO, later chairman, of Sony Computer Entertainment
- Ken Kwaku (born 1946), Ghanaian corporate governance expert
- Ken LaCorte (born 1965), American YouTuber and former Fox News executive
- Ken Lay (1942–2006), American business executive, CEO and chairman of Enron
- Ken Labanowski (born 1959), American-Israeli basketball player
- Ken Leung (born 1970), American film and television actor
- Ken Livingstone (born 1945), British politician, former mayor of London
- Ken Lloyd (born 1976), Japanese-British musician, vocalist and songwriter of Fake? and Oblivion Dust
- Ken Loach (born 1936), British film director
- Ken Lutz (born 1965), American football player
- Ken Matthews (disambiguation), multiple people
- Ken McAlister (born 1960), American football player
- Ken McCarthy (born 1959), American activist, educator, entrepreneur and Internet commercialization pioneer
- Ken McCarty (born 1958), American politician
- Ken MacLeod (born 1954), Scottish science fiction writer
- Ken McElroy (1934–1981), American unsolved murder victim and criminal
- Ken Messer (1931–2018), British painter
- Ken Misner (born 1949), American painter and distance runner
- Ken Miyagishima (born 1963), American mayor
- Ken Mizuno (水野 剣; born 1978), Japanese freestyle skier
- Ken Morrish (1919–2006), mayor of the city of Scarborough, Ontario, Canada
- Ken Morrison (1931–2017), English supermarket CEO
- Ken Moran (1925–2009), Australian Paralympic lawn bowler
- Ken Murray (disambiguation), multiple people
- Ken Nomura (born 1965), Japanese member of the drifting motorsport scene and of the D1 Grand Prix series
- Ken Okuyama (ケン・オクヤマ; born 1959), Japanese car designer, creative director of Pininfarina, professor
- Ken Olin (born 1954), American actor, television director, and producer
- Ken Parrish (born 1984), American football player
- Ken Penders, American comic book writer
- Ken Peplowski (1959–2026), American jazz clarinetist
- Ken Pettway (born 1964), American player of gridiron football
- Ken Phares (born 1951), American football player
- Ken Pogue (1934–2015), Canadian actor
- Ken Rees (1944–2020), Welsh television journalist
- Ken Ring (rapper) (born 1979), Swedish rapper
- Ken Robinson (disambiguation), multiple people
- Ken Rosewall (born 1934), Australian Grand Slam tennis champion
- Ken Rush (1931–2011), American NASCAR Cup Series driver
- Ken Russell (1927–2011), British film director and actor
- Ken Rutherford (cricketer) (born 1965), New Zealand cricketer
- Ken Saro-Wiwa (1941–1995), Nigerian writer and political activist
- Ken Schrader (born 1955), American NASCAR driver
- Ken Seals, American college football player
- Ken Shamrock (born 1964), American mixed martial artist and retired professional wrestler
- Ken Shimura (志村 けん; 1950–2020), Japanese comedian, member of the Drifters
- Ken Shimizu (清水 健; born 1979), Japanese male adult video (AV) actor
- Ken Singleton (born 1947), American Major League Baseball player and commentator
- Ken Sio (born 1990), Australian Rugby League player
- Ken Spears (1938–2020), American cartoonist and film producer
- Ken Spikes (1935–2009), American NASCAR Cup Series driver
- Ken Spreitzer, computer programmer, creator of "Uninstaller"
- Ken Starr (1946–2022), American lawyer and judge
- Ken Stott (born 1954), Scottish actor
- Ken Sugimori (杉森 建; born 1966), Japanese illustrator known for his work on the Pokémon video games
- Ken Takakura (高倉 健; 1931–2014), Japanese film actor
- Ken Terrell (1904–1966), American actor and stuntman
- Ken Thaiday Snr (born 1950), Torres Strait Islander/Australian artist
- Ken Thompson (born 1943), American computer scientist and one of the primary creators of Unix
- Ken Todd (born 1945), British businessman
- Ken Tyrrell (1924–2001), British racing driver, founder of the Formula One team Tyrrell Racing
- Ken Uehara (1909–1991), Japanese film actor
- Ken Wahl (born 1954), American actor
- Ken Waldichuk (born 1998), American baseball player
- Ken Watabe (渡部 建; born 1972), Japanese comedian and television presenter
- Ken Watanabe (渡辺 謙; born 1959), Japanese theater, TV, and film actor
- Ken Webster (disambiguation), multiple people
- Ken Whyld (1926–2003), British chess player and author
- Ken Winey (born 1962), Canadian football player
- Ken Zheng (born 1995), Indonesian actor, screenwriter and martial artist

== Fictional characters ==
- Ken Amada (天田 乾), a character in Persona 3
- Ken (Barbie) also known as Ken Carson, toy doll
- Ken Barlow, character in the British TV soap opera Coronation Street
- Ken Cosgrove, a fictional character in the American television series, Mad Men
- Kenshiro (ケンシロウ) or Ken, hero of the manga and anime series Fist of the North Star
- Kenshin Himura (緋村 剣心) or Ken, main character of the manga and anime series Rurouni Kenshin
- Ken Ryūgūji (龍宮寺 堅), a character of the manga and anime series Tokyo Revengers
- Ken Hisatsu (久津 ケン), a character in the Juken Sentai Gekiranger
- Ken Hoshikawa (星川 健), a character in Chikyu Sentai Fiveman
- Ken Ichijouji (一乗寺 賢), a character in the anime series Digimon
- Ken Joshima (城島 犬), a character in the anime series Reborn!
- Ken Kaneki (金木 研), main character of the manga and anime series Tokyo Ghoul
- Ken Kogashiwa (小柏 健), a character in Initial D
- Ken Marks, a character in 1993 action/martial arts movie Showdown
- Ken Masters (ケン・マスターズ), character in the Street Fighter franchise
- Ken Midori or Kensuke Midorikawa (緑川 ケンスケ), a character in the anime series Beyblade Burst
- Ken Minami (美波 ケン), character in the anime series Machine Robo Rescue
- Ken Murphy, a character in the 2009 American romantic comedy-drama movie He's Just Not That Into You, Daphne Zuniga
- Ken Rosenberg, a character in the Grand Theft Auto video games
- Ultraman Ken, better known as Father of Ultra, from the Ultraman Series; true name revealed in the film Mega Monster Battle: Ultra Galaxy Legend
- Ken, a fictional character from an animated web series The Gaslight District

== See also ==
- Ken (disambiguation)
- Kenneth
- Kenny (disambiguation)
