= Kenny =

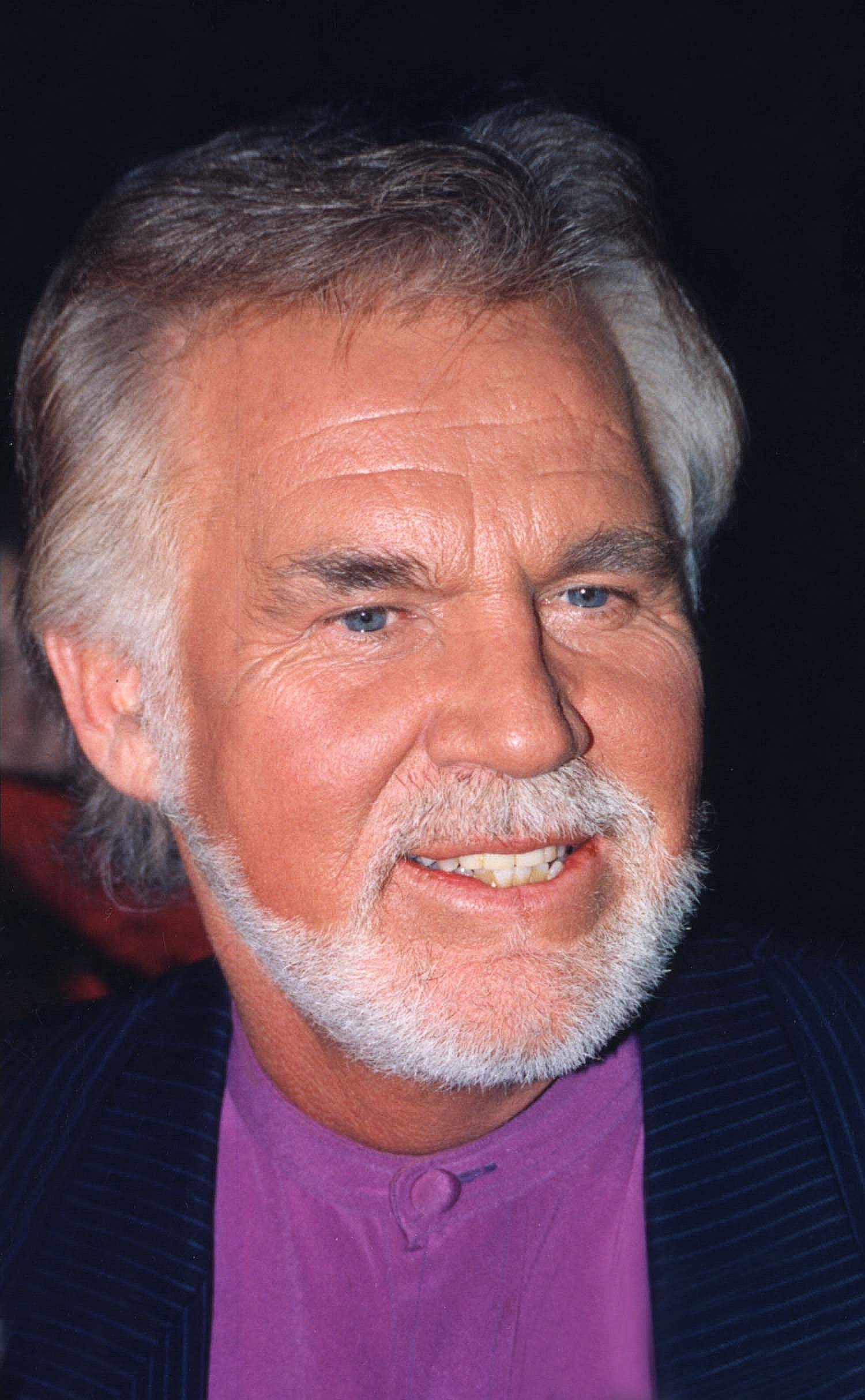
- Kenny Rogers in 1997
- Pronunciation: /ˈkɛni/
- Gender: Male
- Language: Irish

Origin
- Origin: Ó Cionnaith
- Meaning: 'descendant of Cionnaith'
- Region of origin: Ireland

Other names
- Related names: Kenneth, Ken

Kenny is a surname, a given name, and a diminutive of several different given names.

In Ireland, the surname is an Anglicisation of the Irish Ó Cionnaith, also spelt Ó Cionnaoith and Ó Cionaodha, meaning "descendant of Cionnaith". It was once popular in the 16th-century in Leinster, Munster, parts of Connacht and in County Tyrone in Ulster, and was Anglicised as O'Kenna, O'Kenny, O'Kinney, Kenna, Kenney, Kenny, and Kinney amongst other variations.

One bearer of the name was Cainnech of Aghaboe, better known in English as Saint Canice - a sixth-century Irish priest and missionary from near Dungiven, after whom the city and county of Kilkenny is also named. The Irish form Cill Chainnigh means "Church of Canice".

It is thought that the Ó Cionnaith sept was part of the Uí Maine kingdom, based in Connacht. Within this area, the name is associated traditionally with counties Galway and Roscommon.

Kenny is ranked at number 76 in the list of the most common surnames in Ireland. Other spellings include O'Kenny, Kenney, Kennie, Kinnie and Kinny.

The given name, Kenny, is most often used as a short form of the name Kenneth and a diminutive form of Ken.

== Given name ==
- Cainnech of Aghaboe (515/516–600), also known as Saint Kenny, Irish saint, abbot, monastic founder, priest and missionary
- Kenny Adeleke (born 1983), Nigerian basketball player
- Kenny Anderson (basketball) (born 1970), retired basketball player
- Kenny Athiu, association footballer
- Kenny Bailey (born 1974), American football player
- Kenny Baillie, Scottish rugby union player
- Kenny Bain (born 1990), Scottish field hockey player
- Kenny Baker (English actor) (1934–2016), English actor and musician
- Kenny Baker (American performer) (1912–1985), Singer and actor
- Kenny Baker (fiddler) (1926–2011), American fiddle player
- Kenny Baker (trumpeter) (1921–1999), English jazz musician and composer
- Kenny Ball (1930–2013), English jazz musician
- Kenny Banks (1923–1994), English footballer and coach
- Kenny Barron (born 1943), American jazz pianist
- Kenny Bartram (born 1978), American motocross rider
- Kenny Bass (1922–1987), American polka artist
- Kenny Basumatary (born 1980), Indian actor
- Kenny Bates, American stuntman, film producer, and actor
- Kenny Battle (born 1964), American basketball player
- Kenny Bayless (born 1950), American boxing referee
- Kenny Baysmore (born 1961), American boxer
- Kenny Bee (born 1953), Hong Kong singer, musician and actor
- Kenny Bell (born 1992), American football player
- Kenny Bernstein (born 1944), NHRA driver
- Kenny Black (born 1963), Scottish footballer
- Kenny Booker, American basketball player
- Kenny Bräck (born 1966), former Swedish IndyCar driver
- Kenny Chesney (born 1968), American country music singer, songwriter and record producer
- Kenny Chiu (born 1965), Canadian politician
- Kenny Clarke (1914–1985), American jazz drummer and bandleader
- Kenny Dalglish, Scottish soccer player and manager
- Kenny Delmar (1910–1984), American actor and voice artist
- Kenny Dillingham (born 1990), American football coach
- Kenny Dykstra, American professional wrestler
- Kenny Dyson (born 2001), American football player
- Kenny Easley, American football player
- Kenny Easterday (1973–2016), American man with sacral agenesis, known as "Man with half a body"
- Kenny Edwards (rugby league) (born 1989), New Zealand Rugby League player
- Kenny Everett (1944–1995), English disc-jockey and comedian
- Kenny Fields (born 1962), American basketball player
- Kenny Fletcher Jr. (born 2003), American football player
- Kenny Golladay (born 1993), American football player
- Kenny G (born 1956), American saxophonist
- Kenny Habul (born 1973), Australian businessman and racing driver
- Kenny Hagood (1926–1989), American jazz musician
- Kenny Håkansson, Swedish musician
- Kenny Hall (basketball) (born 1990), American basketball player
- Kenny Hall (musician) (1923–2013), American musician
- Kenny Harlock (fl. 1997), New Zealand association football player
- Kenny Harrison (born 1965), American triple jumper and long jumper
- Kenny Harrison (American football) (born 1953), American football player
- Kenny Hasbrouck (born 1986), American basketball player
- Kenny Hashimoto (born 1986), American judoka
- Kenny Havard (born 1971), American politician
- Kenny Hawkes (1968–2011), British DJ
- Kenny Hayes (born 1987), American basketball player
- Kenny Haynes, American basketball player
- Kenny Heitz (1947–2012), American basketball player
- Kenny Hotz, Canadian filmmaker and star of Kenny vs. Spenny
- Kenny Hughes, actor, dancer, director and writer
- Kenny Irwin Jr., former NASCAR driver
- Kenny Jackett, English football player and manager
- Kenny W. James, American voice actor
- Kenny Kadji (born 1988), Cameroonian basketball player in the Israeli Basketball Premier League
- Kenny Kima Beyissa (born 2003), Central African footballer
- Kenny Koplove, American baseball player
- Kenny Lawler (born 1994), American football player
- Kenny Layne (born 1981), American professional wrestler known also by the ring-name Kenny King
- Kenny Lofton, baseball outfielder
- Kenny Loggins (born 1948), American singer and songwriter
- Kenny Lowe, English football manager
- Kenny Mayne, American sports journalist
- Kenny McIntosh (born 2000), American football player
- Kenny Middlemiss (born 1964), Scottish badminton player
- Kenny Miller, Scottish footballer
- Kenny Minchey (born 2005), American football player
- Kenny Moore, American athlete
- Kenny Moore II, American football player
- Kenny O'Dell (1944–2018), American country music singer and songwriter
- Kenny Okoro, American football player
- Kenny Omega (born 1982), ring name of Canadian-born professional wrestler Tyson Smith
- Kenny Ortega (born 1950), film director and producer
- Kenny Perry, American professional golfer
- Kenny Pickett (born 1998), American football player
- Kenny Price (1931–1987), American country music singer-songwriter
- Kenny Roberts (born 1951), American motorcycle racer
- Kenny Roberts Jr. (born 1973), American motorcycle racer
- Kenny Roberts (musician) (1926–2012), American country music singer-songwriter
- Kenny Roberts (swimmer) (born 1978), Seychellois swimmer
- Kenny Robertson (born 1984), American mixed martial arts fighter
- Kenny Robertson (basketball) (born c. 1969), American basketball player
- Kenny Robinson (baseball) (1969–1999), American baseball player
- Kenny Robinson (comedian) (born 1958), Canadian comedian & actor
- Kenny Robinson (American football) (born 1999), American football player
- Kenny Roby, North Carolina-based singer-songwriter
- Kenny Rocha (born 2000), Cape Verdean footballer
- Kenny Rogers (1938–2020), American country singer
- Kenny Rogers (baseball) (born 1964), American baseball player
- Kenny Rollins (1923–2012), American basketball player
- Kenny Rosenberg (born 1995), American baseball player
- Kenny Ross (born 1970), Scottish shanty player
- Kenny Rowe (born 1989), American gridiron football player
- Kenny Saief (born 1993), American-Israeli (of Druze family) professional soccer player
- Kenny Sebastian (born 1990), Indian comedian
- Kenny Stucker (born 1970), American football player
- Kenny Tari (born 1990), Vanuatuan cricketer
- Kenny Tate (born 1990), American gridiron football player
- Kenny Taylor (basketball) (born 1982), American basketball player
- Kenny Tran, a professional Vietnamese American poker player
- Kenny Vaccaro (born 1991), American football player
- Kenny Wallace (born 1974), American NASCAR driver
- Kenny Washington (basketball), American basketball player and coach
- Kenny Willekes (born 1997), American football player
- Kenny Wooten (born 1998), American basketball player
- Kenny Yeboah (born 1998), American football player
- Kenny Young (American football) (born 1994), American football player
- Kenny Youngblood, American motorsports artist

== Surname ==
- Anthony Kenny (born 1931), English philosopher
- Arturo Kenny (born 1888), Argentine polo player
- Bernard Kenny (born 1946), American politician
- Bill Kenny (Australian footballer) (1897–1978), Australian rules footballer
- Bill Kenny (English footballer), played at least one season in the American Soccer League
- Bill Kenny (singer) (1914–1978), African-American singer with The Ink Spots
- Brett Kenny, Australian rugby league footballer
- Brian Kenny (disambiguation)
- Carlos Kenny (born 1950), Argentine field hockey player
- Charles Kenny (1898–1992), American composer and lyricist
- Charles Kenny (cricketer) (1929–1996), English cricketer
- Cindy Kenny-Gilday (born 1954), Sahtu environmentalist and activist for Indigenous rights in Canada
- Clare Kenny (born 1976), British-Swiss artist
- David Kenny (disambiguation)
- Enda Kenny (born 1951), Irish politician, leader of Fine Gael and Taoiseach
- Enda Kenny (singer), Irish-born Australian folksinger and songwriter
- Elizabeth Kenny (1880–1952), unaccredited Australian nurse whose controversial treatment of polio victims became the foundation of physical therapy
- Eoghan Kenny, Irish politician
- Gerard Kenny, British-based American composer, pianist and singer
- Henry Kenny (1913–1975), Irish politician and Gaelic footballer
- Henry Kenny (Australian politician) (1853–1899)
- Henry Edward Kenny (1888–1979), British soldier awarded the Victoria Cross
- J. E. Kenny, Irish politician
- James C. Kenny, former US ambassador to Ireland
- Jason Kenny (born 1988), English cyclist
- Jon Kenny, Irish comedian and actor
- Julie Kenny (1957–2025), English businesswoman
- Laura Kenny (born 1992), British track and road cyclist
- Lawrence Kenny, Catholic priest and exorcist
- Marc Kenny, former Irish footballer
- Matthew Joseph Kenny, Irish politician from Clare
- Maurice Kenny (1929–2016), Mohawk poet
- Mecury Kenny (born 1979), Zimbabwean cricketer
- Michael Kenny (disambiguation), includes some Michaels better known as Mick or Mike
- Mick Kenny (Kilkenny hurler) (1925–2003)
- Mike Kenny (writer), British playwright
- Nick Kenny (poet) (1895–1975), US columnist, lyricist and poet
- Nick Kenny (rugby league), Australian rugby league player
- Paddy Kenny, British-born Irish footballer
- Paddy Kenny (hurler), Irish hurler
- Pat Kenny (born 1948), Irish broadcaster
- Seán Kenny (politician) (born 1942), Irish Labour Party politician
- Sean Kenny (theatre designer), Irish film, theatre and exhibition designer
- Seán Kenny (hurler), Irish hurler
- Stephen Kenny (footballer), Irish football manager
- Tom Kenny (born 1962), American voice actor and comedian best known as the voice of SpongeBob SquarePants
- Tom Kenny (hurler), Irish hurler
- William Kenny (disambiguation)

== Fictional characters ==
- Kenny McCormick, one of the main characters from South Park
- Kenny (Beyblade), in the anime and manga series Beyblade
- Kenny (Tomorrow People), in the 1970s science fiction series The Tomorrow People
- Kenny Powers (character), the protagonist of the HBO series Eastbound and Down
- Kenny Smyth, a corporate bathroom plumber in the 2006 film Kenny
- Kenny Wangler, an African-American drug addict in the HBO drama Oz
- Kenny (Kouji), from Stitch!

== See also ==
- Ken (given name)
- Kenney (disambiguation)
- Kinney (disambiguation)
- List of Irish-language given names
