= List of people from Atlanta =

People from the capital of Georgia, U.S.

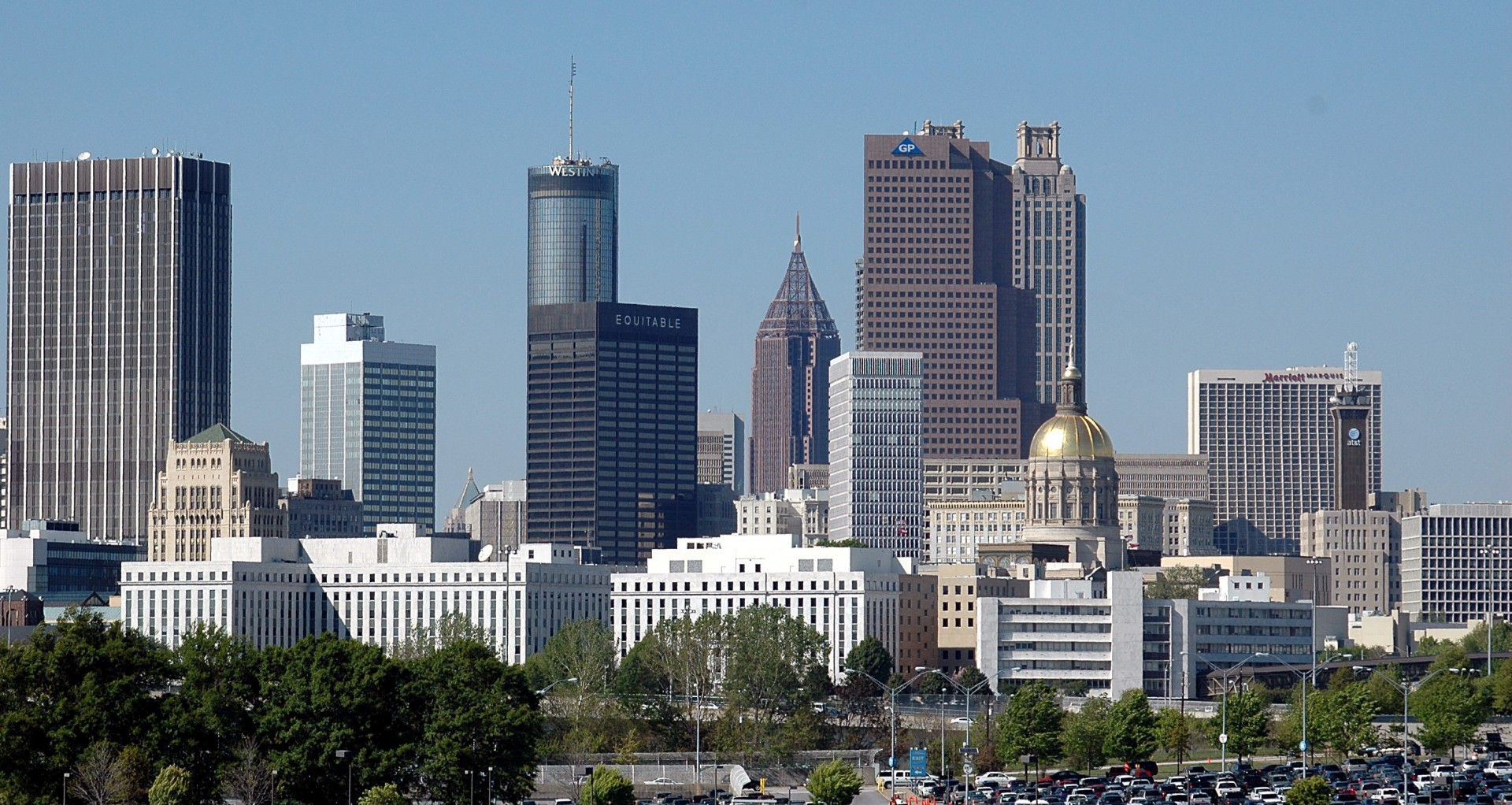
Downtown Atlanta (unknown date)

This is a list of people who were born, raised, or otherwise closely associated with Atlanta, Georgia, United States.

== Academics ==
Name	Known for	Association
Ron Clark	worked with disadvantaged students in rural North Carolina and New York City, and co-founded the Ron Clark Academy in Atlanta; contestant on Survivor: Edge of Extinction	lives in Atlanta
Alfred Gudeman	classical scholar who died during the Holocaust	born in Atlanta
Thomas E. Hill	professor of philosophy at University of North Carolina; fellow of the American Academy of Arts and Sciences	born in Atlanta
Sheryl McCollum	crime analyst, professor, founder and director of the non-profit Cold Case Investigative Research Institute	born in Atlanta
Sharlotte Neely	professor emerita of Anthropology at Northern Kentucky University, author, expert on the Cherokees	lived in Atlanta
Bazoline Estelle Usher	educator and administrator in the Atlanta Public Schools, Georgia Woman of Achievement	lived in Atlanta
Blake Ragsdale Van Leer	former president of Georgia Tech; the first to admit women and make steps towards integration	lived in Atlanta
James W. Wagner	former president of Emory University	lives in Atlanta

== Actors ==
Name	Known for	Association
Isabella Acres	played Rose on the sitcom television series Better Off Ted	born in Atlanta
Mateo Arias	actor, Kickin' It	born in Atlanta
Matt Battaglia	Emmy Award–winning producer; co-produced a two-time Golden Globe Award–nominated film; acted in over 90 films, network pilots, and television shows	grew up in the towns of Tucker and Lithonia, suburbs of Atlanta
Johanna Braddy	actress, The Grudge 3, Paranormal Activity 3 and The Levenger Tapes	born in Atlanta
Toni Braxton	singer, actress and reality-television star of Braxton Family Values	formerly lived in Atlanta
Bruce Bruce	actor and comedian	born in Atlanta
Jahzir Bruno	actor, The Loud House	born in Atlanta
Monica Calhoun	actress, The Players Club, The Best Man, The Salon; graduate of the Los Angeles County High School for the Arts	
Michael Campion	actor, Fuller House	born in Atlanta
Katie Carpenter	actress, costume designer, film producer	lives and works in Atlanta
Barbara Cook	actress and singer	born in Atlanta
C. Martin Croker	voice actor, Zorak and Moltar on Space Ghost: Coast to Coast	born in Atlanta
David Cross	stand-up comedian and actor	born in Atlanta
Stephen Dorff	actor	born in Atlanta
Corri English	actress, in 2006 honored at the International Horror and Sci-Fi Film Festival as Best Actress for Unrest	born in Atlanta
Elle Fanning	actress and model; younger sister of actress Dakota Fanning; known for I Am Sam, Daddy Day Care, The Curious Case of Benjamin Button, We Bought a Zoo, Maleficent	
Priah Ferguson	actress	born in Atlanta
Niles Fitch	actor, known for This Is Us and stage work	born in Atlanta
Hampton Fluker	actor, known for stage work and roles in Shades of Blue and The Terror	raised in Atlanta
Jane Fonda	Academy Award–winning actress, ex-wife of Atlanta television mogul Ted Turner	formerly lived in Atlanta
Jeff Foxworthy	comedian	born in Atlanta
Antonia Gentry	actress, Ginny from Ginny & Georgia	born in Atlanta
Donald Glover	creator, actor, and director of television show Atlanta	attended high school in Atlanta
Jasmine Guy	actress, star of A Different World and film Harlem Nights	grew up and lives in Atlanta
Omari Hardwick		grew up in Atlanta
Oliver Hardy	comedian and actor	studied in Atlanta
Steve Harvey	actor and comedian	resides in Atlanta
Ed Helms	actor, The Office	born in Atlanta
Holly Hunter	Academy Award–winning actress	born in Conyers, outside Atlanta
Dana Ivey	actress	born in Atlanta
DeForest Kelley	actor best known as Dr. McCoy on Star Trek	born in Toccoa, outside Atlanta
Elijah Kelley		
Don Kennedy	voice actor on Space Ghost Coast To Coast; host for many years of The Popeye Club 1956–1970 on WSB-TV; founder of WKLS radio station in Atlanta; syndicated radio broadcaster 1985–2013 (Big Band Jump, The Don Kennedy Show)	lived in Atlanta, died in Atlanta in 2023
Nene Leakes	reality-television star of The Real Housewives of Atlanta	resides in Atlanta
RonReaco Lee		
Chris Lowell	Veronica Mars	born in Atlanta
Christopher Massey	Zoey 101	born in Atlanta
Kyle Massey	That's So Raven	born in Atlanta
China Anne McClain	actress, Tyler Perry's House of Payne, A.N.T. Farm, Descendants and Black Lightning	born in Atlanta
AnnaLynne McCord	actress	born in Atlanta
Chloë Grace Moretz	actress and model, known for roles in Kick-Ass, Hugo, Carrie; winner of two Saturn Awards	born in Atlanta
Brittany Murphy	actress	born in Atlanta
Melissa Ordway	actress and model; known for her roles on Hollywood Heights, The Young and the Restless	born in Atlanta
Kip Pardue	actor	born in Atlanta
Robert Patrick	actor, played "T-1000" in Terminator 2: Judgment Day	
Ty Pennington	television host, artist, carpenter, author, former model and actor	born in Atlanta
Eric Roberts	actor	grew up in Atlanta
Tyler Perry	actor, director, screen and playwright, producer, author, and songwriter; first film Diary of a Mad Black Woman (2005); creator/actor of Madea	moved to Atlanta
Jo Ann Pflug	film and television actress	born in Atlanta
Victoria Principal	actress, Dallas	
Shannon Purser	actress	born in Atlanta
Raven-Symoné	actress, The Cosby Show, Hangin' with Mr. Cooper, That's So Raven, The Cheetah Girls, The View and Raven's Home	born in Atlanta
Storm Reid	actress, Euphoria and A Wrinkle in Time	born in Atlanta
Chandler Riggs	actor, The Walking Dead	born in Atlanta
Julia Roberts	Academy Award–winning actress; films include Pretty Woman and Erin Brockovich	born at Crawford Long Hospital
Faith Salie	actress, comedian, journalist	moved to Atlanta; grew up in Dunwoody
Ryan Seacrest	television and radio personality; host of reality-television series American Idol	attended Dunwoody High School, born in Atlanta
Caroline Sunshine	actress	born in Atlanta
Christopher Tavarez	actor, model and athlete	born in Atlanta
Kenan Thompson	actor and comedian, Saturday Night Live, Fat Albert and Good Burger	moved to Atlanta
Chris Tucker	actor and comedian	born in Atlanta
Barry Van Dyke	actor	born in Atlanta
Danielle Vega	actress	born in Atlanta
George Wallace	actor and comedian	born in Atlanta
Whitney Wegman-Wood	actress	formerly lived in Atlanta
Devon Werkheiser	Ned's Declassified School Survival Guide	born in Atlanta
Porsha Williams	reality-television star of The Real Housewives of Atlanta	born in Atlanta
Scott Wilson	actor, In Cold Blood, The Great Gatsby, The Walking Dead	Atlanta native
Kim Zolciak	reality-television star of The Real Housewives of Atlanta	

== Athletes ==
Name	Known for	Association
Jordan Adams	basketball player	born in Atlanta
Dennis Allen	New Orleans Saints head coach	born in Atlanta
Al-Farouq Aminu	basketball player	born in Atlanta
Conner Antley	soccer player	born in Atlanta
Ian Antley	soccer player	born in Atlanta
Simi Awujo	football player	born in Atlanta
Danny Barbir	soccer player	born in Atlanta
Harris Barton	player of American football	grew up in Atlanta
Malik Beasley	professional basketball player for the Detroit Pistons	born in Atlanta
Gordon Beckham	baseball player	born in Atlanta
Stetson Bennett	player of American football	born in Atlanta
Gunnar Bentz	Olympian	born in Atlanta
Eric Berry	player of American football	born in Atlanta
Ron Blomberg	baseball player	born in Atlanta
Brandon Boykin	player of American football	born in Atlanta
Todd Bramble	soccer player and coach	born in Atlanta
Brett Branan	soccer player	born in Atlanta
Dustin Branan	soccer player	born in Atlanta
Luke Brennan	soccer player	born in Atlanta
Malcolm Brogdon	professional basketball player for the Washington Wizards	born in Atlanta
Jaylen Brown	professional basketball player for the Boston Celtics	born in Atlanta
Nico Brown	soccer player	born in Atlanta
Ricky Byrdsong	college basketball coach and player	born in Atlanta
Wendell Carter Jr.	professional basketball player for the Orlando Magic	born in Atlanta
Rajah Caruth	NASCAR driver	born in Atlanta
Kristi Castlin	track-and-field athlete	born in Atlanta
Kelvin Cato	basketball player	born in Atlanta
Ahmad Caver	basketball player in the Israeli Basketball Premier League	born in Atlanta
Eric Chouinard	ice-hockey player	born in Atlanta
Justin Clark	soccer player	born in Atlanta
Ricardo Clark	soccer player	born in Atlanta
Kenny Coker	soccer player	born in Atlanta
Javaris Crittenton	basketball player	born in Atlanta
Amanda Dennis	goalball player	born in Atlanta
Ben DiNucci	player of American football	born in Atlanta
Amanda Doherty	golfer	born in Atlanta
Cameron Dollar	basketball player	born in Atlanta
Anthony Edwards	professional basketball player for the Minnesota Timberwolves	born in Atlanta
Derrick Favors	basketball player	born in Atlanta
Joseph Forte	basketball player	born in Atlanta
Dexter Fowler	baseball player	born in Atlanta
Jeff Francoeur	baseball player	born in Atlanta
Walt Frazier	basketball player	born in Atlanta
World B. Free	basketball player	born in Atlanta
Coco Gauff	tennis player	born in Atlanta
Mark Gilbert	former baseball player, former U.S. ambassador to New Zealand and former U.S. ambassador to Samoa	born in Atlanta
Maggie Graham	soccer player	born in Atlanta
Jared Harper	basketball player for Hapoel Jerusalem of the Israeli Basketball Premier League	born in Atlanta
JJ Hickson	basketball player	born in Atlanta
Gary Hines	handball player	born in Atlanta
Evander Holyfield	world-champion heavyweight boxer	raised in Atlanta
Dwight Howard	basketball player	born in Atlanta
Tim Hyers	baseball player and coach	born in Atlanta
Bryce Jamison	soccer player	born in Atlanta
Grady Jarrett	player of American football	born in Atlanta
Ernie Johnson Jr.	sportscaster, Turner Sports, TNT	raised in Atlanta, attended University of Georgia
Bobby Jones	golfer	born in Atlanta
Brandon Jones	NASCAR driver	born in Atlanta
Walker Kessler	professional basketball player for the Utah Jazz	born in Atlanta, raised in College Park
Ousman Krubally	American-Gambian basketball player in the Israeli Basketball Premier League	born in Atlanta
DeAngelo Malone	player of American football	born in Atlanta
Robert Mathis	player of American football	born in Atlanta
Erskine Mayer	baseball player	born in Atlanta
Jo Nattawut	Thai-born Muay Thai kickboxer, WBC Muay Thai world champion	raised in Atlanta
Adam Nelson	track-and-field athlete, Olympic champion	born in Atlanta
Cam Newton	player of American football	born in Atlanta
Matt Olson	baseball player	born in Atlanta
Tony Parker	basketball player	born in Atlanta
Jean-Marc Pelletier	ice-hockey player	born in Atlanta
Ben Revere	former baseball player, now a coach for the Atlanta Braves organization	born in Atlanta
Pete Robinson	drag racer	born in Atlanta
Jamaree Salyer	player of American football	born in Atlanta
Ben Shelton	tennis player	born in Atlanta
Kobi Simmons	basketball player for Maccabi Tel Aviv of the Israeli Basketball Premier League	born in Atlanta
Cooper Taylor	former player of American football	born in Atlanta
Jonantan Villal	football player	born in Atlanta
David Villar	baseball player	born in Atlanta
LeRoy T. Walker	former president of the United States Olympic Committee	born in Atlanta
Ibi Watson	basketball player	born in Atlanta
Darius Watts	player of American football	born in Atlanta
Caleb Wiley	soccer player	born in Atlanta
Sam Wyche	player and coach of American football	born in Atlanta

== Business people ==
Name	Field	Known for	Association
F. Duane Ackerman	executive	last CEO of Bellsouth	lived in Atlanta
George Adair	developer	early Atlanta real-estate developer	
Dean Alford	chief executive officer and politician	president and chief executive of Allied Energy Services; member of the Georgia General Assembly	
Ray Anderson	entrepreneur	founder of carpet manufacturer Interface, Inc.	
Charles Brewer	businessman	founder of Internet service provider MindSpring, which later merged with EarthLink	
Asa Griggs Candler	entrepreneur	founder of beverage manufacturer The Coca-Cola Company	
S. Truett Cathy	entrepreneur	founder of the fast-food restaurant chain Chick-fil-A	
Anne Cox Chambers	entrepreneur	co-owner of mass-media company Cox Enterprises	
Joe Francis	entrepreneur and film producer	founder and creator of the Girls Gone Wild franchise	born in Atlanta
Lemuel Grant	businessman and engineer	early-Atlanta railroad man, landowner, engineer and businessman	
James M. Henderson	advertising	born in Atlanta; lived in Greenville, South Carolina, Republican candidate for lieutenant governor of South Carolina in 1970	
Anne T. Hill	fashion designer	founded Taffy's of California	born in Atlanta
Evelyn Greenblatt Howren	aviator	former WASP who founded aviation businesses in Atlanta, lobbied for aviation industry	born in Atlanta
Moss H. Kendrix	public relations	advertising campaigns, including for Coca-Cola	born in Atlanta
Bernard Marcus	entrepreneur	co-founder of home-improvement retailing chain Home Depot; primary funding source for the Georgia Aquarium	
Depelsha Thomas McGruder	executive and activist	chief operating officer of the Ford Foundation	born in Atlanta
Myra Miller	entrepreneur and baker	famous Black food entrepreneur and baker in Atlanta during Reconstruction	worked and buried in Atlanta
John Pemberton	chemist	chemist and inventor of the carbonated soft drink Coca-Cola	
Richard Peters	businessman	early-Atlanta railroad man, landowner and a founder of Atlanta	
John C. Portman Jr.	architect	international architect and developer, designer of the groundbreaking atrium-style hotel	
Neel Reid	architect	student of École des Beaux-Arts; designed various buildings now listed on the National Register of Historic Places	
Ted Turner	media mogul	founder of cable-news channel CNN	
Blake R Van Leer III	entrepreneur and producer	entrepreneur, partner of business mogul Kathy Ireland whose companies generate $3.1B in sales, produced film about his grandfather Blake R Van Leer in a 1956 Sugar Bowl game	born in Atlanta
Robert W. Woodruff	executive	president of beverage manufacturer The Coca-Cola Company	

== Directors ==
Name	Known for	Association
Matt Hullum	director of films, music videos and web series including Lazer Team and Red Vs Blue	born in Atlanta
Spike Lee	director of films including She's Gotta Have It, School Daze, and Do the Right Thing, and several music videos	born in Atlanta
Kenny Leon	director of several Broadway plays and several television episodes	
Tyler Perry	director of films, plays, and television series, including Meet The Browns and Madea plays and movies	moved to Atlanta
Steven Soderbergh	film director, Out of Sight, Erin Brockovich, Traffic, Ocean's Eleven	born in Atlanta

== Journalists ==
Name	Known for	Association
Brooke Baldwin	journalist; formerly for CNN	born in Atlanta
Pat Conroy	educator, journalist, memoirist, novelist	born in 1945 in Atlanta
William Emerson	covered the civil-rights movement as Newsweek's first bureau chief assigned to cover the Southern United States; later editor in chief of The Saturday Evening Post	moved to Atlanta
Bob Jordan	television news journalist, author; former news anchor	born in Atlanta
Frank Stanton	first poet laureate of Georgia	died in Atlanta
Ted Turner	media mogul, TBS and CNN founder; owned Atlanta Braves	moved to Atlanta

== Musicians ==
Name	Known for	Association
Daniela Avanzini	singer, dancer; part of the Grammy-nominated girl group Katseye	born in Atlanta
21 Savage, real name Shayaa Bin Abraham-Joseph	rapper and record producer	born in London, England, raised in Atlanta
6LACK, real name Ricardo Valdez Valentine	rapper, singer, songwriter	moved to Atlanta at very young age
Aliyah's Interlude	rapper and influencer	born in Atlanta
André 3000, real name André Lauren Benjamin	rapper, actor, record producer, singer-songwriter and multi-instrumentalist; half of the rap group OutKast	born and raised in Atlanta
Murray Attaway	singer-songwriter, founding member of Guadalcanal Diary	born in Atlanta
Johntá Austin	singer-songwriter, signed to Jermaine Dupri's So So Def Recordings; won two Grammy Awards for songs "We Belong Together" by Mariah Carey and "Be Without You" by Mary J. Blige	born in Atlanta
B.o.B, real name Bobby Ray Simmons Jr.	rapper	from Atlanta
Bali Baby	rapper	born in Atlanta
Bankroll Fresh, real name Trentavious Zamon White, Sr.	rapper	from Atlanta and died in Atlanta
David Berkeley	singer-songwriter	moved to Atlanta for his wife to finish school
Big Boi, real name Antwan Patton	rapper, actor, record producer, songwriter; half of the rap group Outkast	born in Savannah, Georgia, raised in Atlanta
Big Kuntry King, real name Sean Merrett	rapper	from Atlanta
Bktherula	rapper	born in Atlanta
Bobby V, real name Bobby Wilson	recording artist (nicknamed "Valentino" because he was due to be born on Valentine's Day)	attended North Atlanta High School and Clark Atlanta University
Zac Brown	country singer	born in Atlanta
Peter Buck	lead guitar player and songwriter for R.E.M.	lived in Atlanta
John Burke	solo pianist and composer	born and lives in Atlanta
Kandi Burruss	singer, songwriter, record producer; part of the group Xscape, wrote "No Scrubs" by TLC and "Bills, Bills, Bills" by Destiny's Child	born in College Park, Georgia, resides in Atlanta
K Camp, real name Kristopher Thomas Campbell	rapper	from Atlanta
Ken Carson, real name Kenyatta Lee Frazier Jr.	rapper	born in Atlanta
Ric Cartey, real name Whaley Thomas Cartey	1950s rockabilly singer; songwriter	born in Atlanta
Cash Out, real name John-Michael Hakim Gibson	rapper	from Atlanta
Cat Power, also known as Chan Marshall, real name Charlyn Marshall	singer-songwriter, actress and model	born in Atlanta
Eddie Chamblee	jazz tenor saxophonist	born in Atlanta in 1920
Che	rapper	born and based in Atlanta
Ciara	singer	
Clairo, real name Claire Elizabeth Cottrill	singer-songwriter	born in Atlanta
Kelly Nelon Clark	inspirational Christian and southern gospel vocalist	born in Atlanta
Freddy Cole	jazz singer and pianist	born in Chicago in 1931; resided in Atlanta for over fifty years until his death in 2020
Roscoe Dash, real name Jeffery Lee Johnson Jr.	rapper	from Atlanta
Davido	singer, songwriter, and record producer	born in Atlanta but based in Nigeria
Destroy Lonely, real name Bobby Wardell Sandimanie III	rapper	born in Atlanta
Drumma Boy, real name Christopher James Gholson	record producer, songwriter	lives in Atlanta
Roy Drusky	country singer	born in Atlanta
Sonny Emory	drummer	born and raised in Atlanta
Future, real name Nayvadius DeMun Wilburn	rapper, singer, songwriter, and record producer	born and raised in Atlanta
Sean Garrett	singer and songwriter	born in Atlanta
O.T. Genasis	rapper	born in Atlanta
CeeLo Green, real name Thomas DeCarlo Gallaway	rapper, singer, actor	born and raised in Atlanta
Kristin Hersh	singer and guitarist	born in Atlanta
Keri Hilson	singer-songwriter and actress from Decatur	attended Emory University
iLoveMakonnen, real name Makonnen Kamali Sheran	rapper	from Atlanta
India Arie, real name India Arie Simpson	singer-songwriter and record producer; has sold over 3.3 million records in the U.S.; has won four Grammy Awards, including Best R&B Album	moved to Atlanta
Graham Jackson	theatre organist, pianist and choral conductor	moved to Atlanta in 1923
Trinidad James, real name Nicholas Williams	rapper	from Atlanta
Erika Jayne	singer	born in Atlanta
Jeezy, real name Jay Wayne Jenkins	rapper, entrepreneur, and businessman	born in South Carolina, raised in Atlanta
JID, real name Destin Route	rapper, singer	born in Atlanta
Elton John	singer-songwriter, English-born entertainer whose songs include "Your Song", "Crocodile Rock" and "Candle in the Wind"	lives part-time in Atlanta
Mario Judah	rapper	
Kap G	rapper, actor	born in Long Beach, California, moved to Atlanta
R. Kelly	singer, songwriter, record producer	resided in Atlanta
Khujo, real name Willie Edward Knighton Jr.	rapper	born in Atlanta
Killer Mike, real name Michael Santiago Render	rapper, actor and activist	born and raised in Atlanta
Kaki King	guitarist and composer	born in Atlanta
Gladys Knight	singer-songwriter, actress, businesswoman and author	born in Atlanta
Latto, real name Alyssa Michelle Stephens	rapper	born in Columbus, Ohio, raised in Atlanta
Brenda Lee	performer who sang rockabilly, pop and country music; had 37 US chart hits during the 1960s, known for songs "I'm Sorry" (1960) and "Rockin' Around the Christmas Tree" (1958); recipient of Grammy Lifetime Achievement Award (2009)	born in Atlanta in 1944
Mable Lee	dancer, entertainer, 2008 inductee into the Tap Dance Hall of Fame	born in Atlanta in 1921
Lil Baby, real name Dominique Jones	rapper	born and raised in Atlanta
Lil Gnar, real name Caleb Samuel Shepard	rapper	born in Oakland, California, from Atlanta
Lil Gotit, real name Semaja Zair Render	rapper	born in Atlanta
Lil Jon, real name Jonathan H. Smith	rapper, record producer, songwriter and Grammy Award winner	born and raised in Atlanta
Lil Keed, real name Raqhid Jevon Render	rapper	born in Atlanta and died in Los Angeles
Lil RT	rapper	born in Atlanta
Lil Scrappy, real name Darryl Raynard Richardson III	rapper	from Atlanta
Lil Yachty, real name Miles Parks McCollum	rapper, songwriter	from Atlanta
Baylee Littrell	singer-songwriter and actor; son of Backstreet Boys member Brian Littrell	born and raised in Alpharetta, Georgia
Ludacris, real name Christopher Brian Bridges	rapper	born in Champaign, Illinois; raised in Atlanta
Vivek Maddala	composer, producer, multi-instrumental performer	attended Georgia Tech
MadeinTYO, real name Malcolm Jamaal Davis	rapper	originated in Atlanta
Gucci Mane, real name Radric Davis	rapper, actor	born in Alabama; raised in Atlanta
Mariah the Scientist	singer	born in Atlanta
China Anne McClain	singer-songwriter and actress (Jasmine Payne on television series Tyler Perry's House of Payne, Chyna Parks on A.N.T. Farm)	born in Atlanta
Big Maceo Merriweather	blues singer-pianist, made many recordings in the 1940s for Bluebird and Victor	born in Atlanta in 1905
Migos (Quavo, Offset, Takeoff)	rap group	all born and raised in Atlanta
Money Man	rapper	
Shawn Mullins	singer-songwriter	born in Atlanta
Eric Nam	Korean-American singer-songwriter, television host, entertainer and entrepreneur currently based in South Korea	born in Atlanta
OJ da Juiceman, real name Otis Williams Jr.	rapper	from Atlanta
Pastor Troy	rapper	from Atlanta
Duke Pearson	jazz pianist and composer, noted for work on the Blue Note label	born in Atlanta 1932; died in Atlanta 1980
Scott Phillips	drummer, percussionist, keyboardist, and co-founder of rock band Creed	born in Atlanta
Playboi Carti, real name Jordan Terrell Carter	rapper and songwriter	born in Riverdale, Atlanta
Mac Powell	Christian singer	
Jerry Reed	country-music singer-songwriter, guitarist and actor who appeared in more than a dozen films; signature songs include "Guitar Man", "East Bound and Down", "A Thing Called Love" and "When You're Hot, You're Hot"	born in Atlanta
Rich Homie Quan, real name Dequantes Devontay Lamar	rapper	from Atlanta
Porter Robinson	DJ, record producer, singer-songwriter	born in Atlanta
Chris Robinson	singer-songwriter	born in Atlanta
Rocko	rapper	from Atlanta
Tommy Roe	singer-songwriter	from Atlanta
Rubi Rose	rapper	born in Lexington, Kentucky; based in Atlanta
Kelly Rowland	singer-songwriter with Destiny's Child and as a solo artist; actress and television personality; two-time Grammy Award winner	born in Atlanta
Russ	rapper	from Atlanta
SahBabii, real name Saaheem Valdery	rapper and songwriter	born in Chicago; raised in Atlanta
Troy Sanders	bass player, singer-songwriter of Grammy Award–winning metal band Mastodon	born in Atlanta
Cappriccieo Scates	drummer and record producer; won Phoenix Award in 2011	lives and works in Atlanta
Kodie Shane	rapper	born in Atlanta
Silentó	rapper, singer and songwriter	
Natalie Lauren Sims, also known as Suzy Rock	musician, songwriter, graphic and art designer, and music executive	moved to Atlanta in 2007
Skooly, real name Kazarion Fowler	rapper	from Atlanta
Musiq Soulchild	singer, songwriter	resides in Atlanta
Soulja Boy, real name DeAndre Cortez Way	rapper	from Atlanta
Southside, real name Joshua Howard Luellen	rapper, record producer	from Atlanta
Angie Stone	singer and record producer	moved to Atlanta
T.I., real name Clifford Joseph Harris Jr.	rapper, actor and businessman	born and raised in Atlanta
Rozonda "Chilli" Thomas	singer-songwriter, dancer, and actress from TLC	born in Atlanta
Chris Tomlin	contemporary Christian music artist, worship leader and songwriter; co-founder, Passion Conferences Christian organization	from Grand Saline, Texas; moved to Atlanta
DJ Toomp	record producer, songwriter and Grammy Award winner	born and lives in Atlanta
Trouble, real name Mariel Semonte Orr	rapper	from Atlanta
Unk, real name Anthony Platt	rapper	from Atlanta
Usher, real name Usher Raymond	singer-songwriter, dancer and actor; rose to fame in late 1990s with release of second album My Way	attended North Springs High School
Waka Flocka Flame, real name Juaquin James Malphurs	rapper	
Summer Walker	singer	from Atlanta
Florence Warner	singer-songwriter; best known for her appearance on television commercials and local television image campaigns	born in Atlanta
Tionne "T-Boz" Watkins	singer-songwriter, dancer, and actress from TLC	lived in Atlanta
Faye Webster	singer-songwriter	from Atlanta
Freddy Weller	singer-songwriter	from Atlanta
Kanye West	rapper, singer-songwriter, record producer and fashion designer; one of the best-selling artists of all time	born in Atlanta, raised in Chicago
YC, real name Christopher Daniels Miller	rapper	from Atlanta
YFN Lucci	rapper	born in Atlanta
Young Dro, real name D'Juan Montrel Hart	rapper	from Atlanta
Young Nudy, real name Quantavious Tavario Thomas	rapper	from Atlanta
Young Scooter, real name Kenneth Edward Bailey	rapper	from Atlanta
Young Thug, real name Jeffery Lamar Williams	rapper, songwriter	born and lives in Atlanta
Yung Joc	rapper	born in Atlanta

== Politics and law ==
Name	Known for	Association
Paul V. Applegarth	former chief executive officer, Millennium Challenge Corporation	raised in Atlanta until college
James Earl "Jimmy" Carter Jr.	76th governor of Georgia and 39th president of the United States	lived in Atlanta; attended the Georgia Institute of Technology
Knowa De Baraso	political commentator	lives in Atlanta
Nathan Deal	82nd governor of Georgia	lived in Atlanta
Lawrence Dennis	diplomat, consultant, author, advocate for fascism	born in Atlanta
Andre Dickens	61st mayor of Atlanta	born in Atlanta
John Brown Gordon	Confederate States Army lieutenant general; 53rd governor of Georgia	lived in Atlanta
Kwanza Hall	U.S. representative, Atlanta City Council member	born and lived in Atlanta
Stumpy Harris	eminent-domain lawyer	born in Atlanta
Cora Catherine Calhoun Horne	Black suffragist, civil-rights activist, and Atlanta socialite	born and raised in Atlanta; attended Atlanta University
Maynard Holbrook Jackson Jr.	54th and 56th mayor of Atlanta; first Black mayor of Atlanta	attended college and lived in Atlanta
Martin Luther King Jr.	civil-rights leader, religious leader	born in Atlanta
John Lewis	U.S. representative, Atlanta City Council member, civil-rights activist	lived in Atlanta
Lester Maddox	75th governor of Georgia	born and lived in Atlanta
Michelle Nunn	foreign service, candidate for senator, non-profit chief executive officer	born and lived in Atlanta
Jon Ossoff	U.S. senator from Georgia	born and lived in Atlanta
Kasim Reed	59th mayor of Atlanta	lived in Atlanta
David Scott	U.S. representative, Georgia state senator, Georgia representative	lived in Atlanta
Randolph W. Thrower	former commissioner of Internal Revenue	lived in Atlanta
Conrad Tillard	politician, Baptist minister, radio host, author, and activist	
Raphael Warnock	first African-American U.S. senator from Georgia	lived and pastored in Atlanta
Charline White	first African-American woman to be elected to the Michigan Legislature	born in Atlanta
Nikema Williams	U.S. representative, Georgia state senator, chair of the Georgia Democratic Party	lived in Atlanta
Christopher C. Wimbish	African-American Illinois state senator and lawyer	born and lived in Atlanta

== Religious leaders ==
Name	Known for	Association
Paul S. Morton	founding pastor of Changing a Generation Full Gospel Baptist Church in Atlanta; founder and first presiding bishop of the Full Gospel Baptist Church Fellowship; Grammy Award–nominated gospel recording artist	lives in Atlanta
Andy Stanley	senior pastor of North Point Community Church, Buckhead Church, and other local churches; founded North Point Ministries, a worldwide Christian organization	moved to Atlanta
Charles Stanley	senior pastor of First Baptist Church in Atlanta; founder and president of In Touch Ministries; served as president of the Southern Baptist Convention 1984–1986	moved to Atlanta

== Writers and artists ==
Name	Known for	Association
Bob the Drag Queen	drag queen	born in Atlanta
Paul Darcy Boles	author and advertising writer	long-time resident
Violet Chachki	drag queen	born in Atlanta
Shanequa Gay	visual artist	born in Atlanta
Lewis Grizzard	writer and humorist	lived in Atlanta
Joel Chandler Harris	wrote the Uncle Remus stories	lived in West End of Atlanta
Tayari Jones	author	born and grew up in Atlanta, attended Spelman College, professor at Emory University
Cheryl McKay	wrote The Ultimate Gift screenplay	lives in Atlanta
Margaret Mitchell	wrote novel Gone with the Wind	born, lived, and died in Atlanta
Flannery O'Connor	Southern gothic writer	attended one year of school in Atlanta
Judith Pordon	poet and editor	born in Atlanta
Anne Rivers Siddons	novelist	born in Atlanta
Lucy May Stanton	artist	born in Atlanta
Natasha Tretheway	poet	lived in Atlanta (taught at Emory University)
Isabel Wilkerson	author and journalist	lived in Atlanta (taught at Emory University)

== See also ==
- List of people from Georgia (U.S. state)
