= Kenneth =

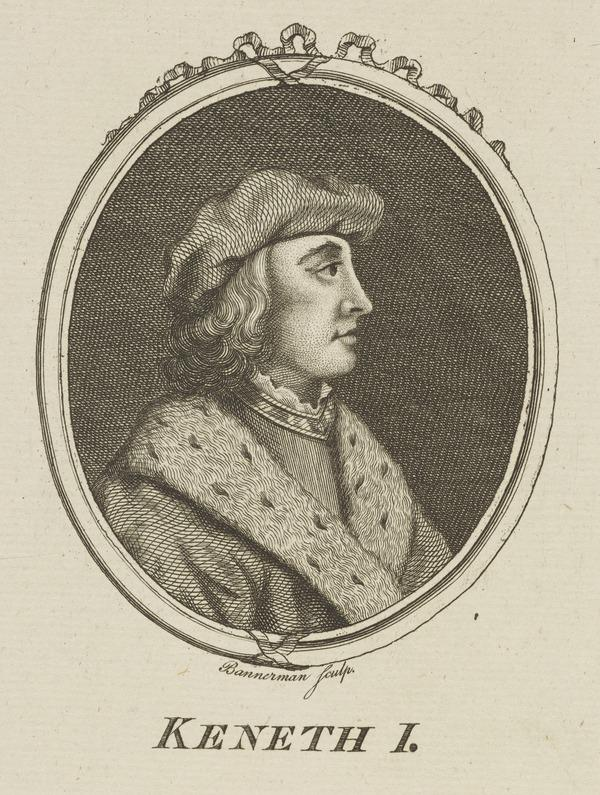
- 18th-century depiction of Kenneth I of Scotland
- Pronunciation: /ˈkɛn.əθ/ KEN-ith
- Gender: Masculine
- Language: English

Origin
- Language: Scottish Gaelic
- Meaning: 'handsome' 'fire-born'
- Region of origin: Scotland

Other names
- Nicknames: Ken, Kenny
- Related names: Cainnech/Coinneach, Cináed

Kenneth is a given name of Gaelic origin. The name is an Anglicised form of two entirely different Gaelic personal names: Cainnech and Cináed. The modern Scottish Gaelic form of Cainnech is Coinneach; the name was derived from a byname meaning "handsome", "comely".

== Etymology ==
The second part of the name Cinaed is derived either from the Celtic *aidhu, meaning "fire", or else Brittonic jʉ:ð meaning "lord".

== People ==
- Kenneth (1927–2013), born Kenneth Battelle, American celebrity hairdresser
- Kenneth MacAlpin, Kenneth I of Scotland
- Kenneth II of Scotland
- Kenneth III of Scotland
- Kenneth J. Alford (1881–1945), English composer
- Kenneth Allen (murderer) (born 1942), American murderer
- Kenneth Allott (1912–1973), Anglo-Irish poet and academic
- Kenneth Alwyn (1925–2020), English conductor and composer
- Kenneth Amis (b. 1970), Bermudian tuba player
- Kenneth Anger (1927–2023), American avant-garde-film director
- Kenneth Arrow (1921–2017), American economist, Nobel Memorial Prize in Economics winner, 1972
- Kenneth Atchity (born 1944), American producer, author, columnist, and book reviewer
- Kenneth Bager (b. 1962), Danish musician and record producer
- Kenneth Bainbridge (1904–1996), American physicist
- Kenneth Baker, Baron Baker of Dorking (b. 1934), UK Home Secretary
- Kenneth Barner, American engineer
- Kenneth Beard (1927–2010), English Cathedral Organist
- Kenneth Benton (1909–1999), British MI6 officer and author
- Kenneth Bianchi (b. 1951), American serial killer, one of the Hillside Stranglers
- Kenneth Bigley (1942–2004), contractor, beheaded on television in Iraq
- Kenneth W. Bilby (1918–1997), American recipient of the Legion of Honour, executive vice president of RCA, and author
- Kenneth Blevins, American drummer and percussionist
- Sir Kenneth Bloomfield (1931–2025), former Head of the Northern Ireland Civil Service
- Kenneth E. Boulding (1910–1993), economist
- Kenneth Bowen (1932–2018), Welsh singer and musical director
- Kenneth Box (1930–2022), British track and field sprinter
- Sir Kenneth Branagh (b. 1960), Irish Shakespearean and film actor
- Kenneth Bressett (b. 1928), American numismatist
- Kenneth Bron (Kenny B) (b. 1961), Surinamese-born singer
- Kenneth Bruffee (1934–2019), Professor emeritus at Brooklyn College
- Kenneth Burke (1897–1993), American literary theorist and philosopher
- Kenneth Calman (1941–2025), English chief medical officer
- Kenneth Carpenter (b. 1949), paleontologist
- Kenneth G. Caulton, inorganic chemist and professor
- Kenneth Chenault (b. 1951), former CEO of American Express
- Kenneth Arnold Chesney (b. 1968), American country singer
- Kenneth Church (1930–2020), Canadian jockey
- Kenneth Clark (1903–1983), English art historian
- Kenneth Clark (psychologist)
- Kenneth Clarke (b. 1940), Chancellor of the Exchequer
- Kenneth Cole (b. 1954), American clothing designer
- Kenneth Colley (1937–2025), English actor
- Kenneth R. Conklin, activist
- Kenneth Connor (1918–1993), British comedic actor
- Kenneth Cope (1931–2024), English actor
- Kenneth Cope (musician) (b. 1961), Mormon music composer
- Kenneth Crosby (1904–1998), British Wesleyan missionary, bible translator and language scholar
- Kenneth Darling (1909–1998), British general
- Kenneth C. Davis, American historian, author
- Kenneth Dougall (b. 1993), Australian association football player
- Kenneth Dover (1920–2010), British academic
- Kenneth "K. K." Downing (b. 1951), guitarist
- Kenneth J. Dunkley (b. 1939), American inventor
- Kenneth Easterday (1973–2016), American man born with the rare disability, sacral agenesis
- Kenneth Edmonds ("Babyface") (b. 1959), American R&B singer
- Kenneth Erskine (b. 1963), serial killer
- Kenneth H. Fake (1895–1963), American politician
- Kenneth Farrow (American football) (b. 1993), American football player
- Kenneth Fearing (1902–1961), American poet
- Kenneth Feinberg (b. 1945), American attorney
- Kenneth Ford (disambiguation), several people
- Kenneth Frampton (b. 1930), British architect and architecture critic
- Kenneth Gainwell (b. 1999), American football player
- John Kenneth Galbraith (1908–2006), Canadian-American economist
- Kenneth Gamble (b. 1943), songwriter and producer
- Kenneth Gasana (b. 1984), Rwandan basketball player
- Kenneth J. Gergen (b. 1935), American psychologist
- Kenneth R. Giddens (1908–1993), broadcaster
- Kenneth Gittens (born 1971), Virgin Islands politician
- Kenneth Goff (1914–1972), American minister
- Kenneth Gorelick (Kenny G) (b. 1956), smooth jazz professional saxophonist
- Kenneth Grahame (1859–1932), British author
- Kenneth C. Griffin (b. 1968), American entrepreneur and billionaire
- Kenneth E. Hagin (1917–2003), Pentecostal minister
- Kenneth L. Hale (1934–2001), American linguist
- Kenneth Halliwell (1926–1967), British actor, lover and murderer of Joe Orton
- Kenneth Ham (b. 1954), American astronaut
- Kenneth "Ken" Holtzman (1945–2024), American Major League Baseball pitcher
- Kenneth "Ken" Hon, American geologist and head of Hawaiian Volcano Observatory.
- Kenneth Horne (1907–1969), English actor and comedian
- Kenneth Gardner Hughes (b. 1954), Canadian politician
- Kenneth Hutchings (1882–1916), English amateur cricketer
- Kenneth Irons, comic book character in Witchblade
- Kenneth E. Iverson (1920–2004), Canadian computer scientist, developed the APL programming language
- Kenneth Jamieson, American politician
- Kenneth Jeyaretnam (Kenneth Andrew Jeyaretnam) (1959–2026), Singaporean hedge fund manager and politician
- Kenneth V. Jones (1924–2020), British composer
- Kenneth Katzner (1930–2003), American linguist
- Kenneth Kaunda (1924–2021), first President of Zambia
- Kenneth Keating (1900–1975), US Senator
- Kenneth Kedi (b. 1971), Marshallese politician
- Kenneth Kendall (1924–2012), British newsreader
- Kenneth Keith Kelley (1901–1991), American chemist
- Kenneth Kennedy (speed skater) (1913–1985), Australian Winter Olympian
- Jonathan King (b. 1944), born Kenneth George King, pop music mogul
- Kenneth Kitchen (1932–2025), British historian, Egyptologist
- Kenneth Klassen (b. 1951), Canadian sex tourist
- Kenneth Koch (1925–2002), American poet
- Kenneth Kraus (b. 1956), former United States Marine
- Kenneth Law (born 1965), Canadian man who assisted suicides
- Kenneth Lawson (b. 1963), law professor and former lawyer
- Kenneth Lay (1942–2006), American businessman, former CEO of Enron
- Kenneth Little (1908–1991), English academic
- Kenneth Livingstone (b. 1945), English politician
- Kenneth Ma (b. 1974), Hong Kong actor
- Kenneth Mackintosh (1875–1957), justice of the Washington Supreme Court
- Kenneth McClintock (b. 1957), former Secretary of State of Puerto Rico
- Kenneth McDavid, American murder victim
- Kenneth McDuff (1946–1998), American serial killer
- Kenneth McKellar (1869–1957), American politician
- Kenneth McKellar (1927–2010), Scottish singer
- Kenneth Meers (1960–1992), American murder victim
- Kenneth Barbour Montgomery (1897–1965), English World War I flying ace
- Kenneth More (1914–1982), English actor (Genevieve, Reach for the Sky)
- Kenneth Murdock (born 1963), Canadian truck driver who was a hitman for the Musitano crime family of Hamilton, Ontario
- Kenneth Murray (disambiguation), multiple people
- Kenneth O'Donnell (1924–1977), American political aide
- Kenneth O'Keefe (b. 1969), American-Irish-Palestinian activist
- Kenneth Roderick O'Neal (1908–1989), African-American architect
- Kenneth Odumegwu (born 2000), Nigerian-American football player
- Kenneth A. Oye (b. 1949), Associate Professor of Political Science and Engineering Systems, MIT
- Kenneth Parnell (1931–2008), American convicted sex offender, child rapist, and kidnapper
- Kenneth Paschal (born 1966), American politician
- Kenneth Perez (b. 1974), Danish footballer
- Kenneth Lee Pike (1912–2000), American linguist and anthropologist
- Kenneth Platts (1946–1989), British composer
- Kenneth Ramchand (b. 1939), Trinidad and Tobago academic and writer
- Kenneth Rexroth (1905–1982), American poet
- Kenneth Robinson (British politician) (1911–1996), British politician and broadcaster
- Kenneth Rose (1924–2014), royal biographer
- Kenneth Ross, Scottish-American screenwriter of the films The Day of the Jackal, The Odessa File, etc.
- Kenneth G. Ross (b. 1941), Australian playwright, and screenwriter of the film Breaker Morant
- Kenneth Schellenberger (b. 1948), Canadian politician
- Kenneth Searight (1883–1957), British writer and linguist
- Kenneth Shaw ("Buzz" Shaw) (b. 1939), American academic, college chancellor
- Kenneth Slessor (1901–1971), Australian poet
- Kenneth Starr (1946–2022), American lawyer, special investigator of U.S. President Bill Clinton
- Kenneth M. Taylor (1919–2006), American WWII pilot
- Kenneth Thomson, 2nd Baron Thomson of Fleet (1923–2006), Canadian businessman, billionaire
- Kenneth Tigar (b. 1942), American actor
- Kenneth Tiong (b. 1989), Singaporean businessman and politician
- Kenneth Tolon II (b. 1981), college football player
- Kenneth Tynan (1927–1980), English theatre critic and writer
- Kenneth Vance, American politician
- Kenneth N. Waltz (1924–2013), American political scientist
- Kenneth Warren (1926–2019), British Conservative Party politician
- Kenneth Welsh (1942–2022), Canadian actor
- Kenneth Williams (1926–1988), English comedian and actor
- Kenneth G. Wilson (1936–2013), American theoretical physicist, winner of the Nobel Prize in Physics, 1982

== Fictional characters ==
- Kenneth Widmerpool, in Anthony Powell's novel sequence A Dance to the Music of Time
- Kenneth Parcell, in the sitcom 30 Rock

== See also ==
- Ken (given name)
- Kenn (name)
- Kenny
