= Kendrick (name) =

Kendrick is a surname, sometimes used as a masculine given name, which may originate from:

- The Welsh name Cynwrig meaning "greatest champion", or
- The Anglo-Saxon name Cyneric meaning cyne (royal, of a king) + rīks (king, ruler).
- The Highland Scots surname Machendrie, frequently anglicized into Kendrick and MacKendrick

The first recorded spelling is that of John Kendrich, which was dated 1279, in the Hundred Rolls of Cambridgeshire, during the reign of King Edward I of England.

Notable people with the name include:

== Surname ==
- Alex Kendrick (born 1970), American pastor, screenwriter, director and actor
- Anna Kendrick (born 1985), American actress
- Asahel C. Kendrick (1809–1895), American classicist, grammarian and exegete
- Brian Kendrick (born 1979), American professional wrestler
- Derion Kendrick (born 2000), American football player
- Donald Kendrick (born 1947), Canadian choirmaster
- Eddie Kendricks (1939–1992), Motown recording artist and founding member of The Temptations
- Ella B. Kendrick (1849–1928), American temperance activist
- Ellie Kendrick (born 1990), British actress
- Fiona Kendrick (born 1955), chairman and CEO of Nestlé UK & Ireland
- Flora Kendrick (1880–1969), British artist
- Frank Kendrick (1950–2024), American basketball player
- Frank Kendrick (footballer) (1914–1995), Australian rules footballer
- George Prentiss Kendrick, American artist
- Graham Kendrick (born 1950), British Christian singer-songwriter
- Helen Kendrick Johnson (1844–1917), American anti-suffragist activist and writer
- Howie Kendrick (born 1983), American baseball player for the Washington Nationals
- John Kendrick (disambiguation), multiple people
- Ken Kendrick (born 1943), American businessman and principal owner/managing general partner of Arizona Diamondbacks
- Kyle Kendrick (born 1984), American baseball pitcher in the Boston Red Sox organization
- Nancy Kendrick, American philosopher
- Rhonda Ross Kendrick (born 1971), American actress
- Rob Kendrick, British guitarist, member of Trapeze
- Robert Kendrick (born 1979), American tennis player
- Rodney Kendrick (born 1960) American jazz pianist
- Stephen Kendrick, pastor, screenwriter and producer
- Thomas Kendrick (disambiguation), multiple people
- W. Freeland Kendrick, mayor of Philadelphia (1924–1928)
- William Kenrick (disambiguation), multiple people

== Given name ==
- Kendrick Jeru Davis (born 1971), American rapper better known as Jeru the Damaja
- Kendrick Frazier (1942–2022), American science writer
- Kendrick Green (born 1998), American football player
- Ken Jeong (born Kendrick Kang-Joh Jeong, 1969), American comedian and actor
- Kendrick Lamar (born 1987), American rapper
- Kendrick Law (born 2003), American football player
- Kendrick Lee Yen Hui (born 1984), Singaporean badminton player
- Kendrick Mosley (born 1981), American football player
- Kendrick Norton (born 1997), American football player
- Kendrick Nunn (born 1995), American basketball player
- Kendrick Office (born 1978), American football player
- Kendrick Perkins (born 1984), American basketball player
- Kendrick Raphael (born 2003), American football player
- Kendrick Rogers (born 1997), American football player
- Kendrick Scott (born 1980), American jazz drummer and bandleader
- Kendrick Starling (born 1979), American football player
- Kendrick Taylor (born 1957), American scientist

== See also ==
- Clan Henderson, a Scottish clan for which Kendrick is an Anglicized sept
- Kendra
- Kendricks, a surname
- Kendrix
