= Kendall (given name) =

- Gender: Unisex
- Language: English

Origin
- Origin: England
- Meaning: "The Kent River Valley"

Other names
- Related names: Kendal; Ken; Kenny

Kendall is a unisex given name. Notable people and characters with the name include:

== People ==
- Kendall Anthony (born 1993), American basketball player
- Kendall Blanton (born 1995), American football player
- Kendall Broadbent (1837–1911), English Australian naturalist and explorer
- Kendall Brown (snowboarder) (born 1989), New Zealand snowboarder
- Kendall Brown (basketball) (born 2003), American basketball player
- Kendall Carly Browne (1918–2018), American actress and television host
- Kendall Butze (born 2003), American ice hockey player
- Kendall L. Card (born 1955), American aviator and United States Navy Vice Admiral
- Kendall Chase (born 1994), American rower
- Kendall Ciesemier, American writer, producer, and reporter
- Kendall Clements, New Zealand marine fish ecologist
- Kendall Cooper (born 2002), Canadian ice hockey player
- Kendall Cornine (born 1996), American ice hockey player
- Kendall Coyne Schofield (born 1992), American ice hockey player
- Kendall Donnerson (born 1996), American football player
- Kendall Ebeling (born 2006), Vietnamese-American Singer and member of group Girlset
- Kendall Ellis (born 1996), American sprinter
- Kendall Francois (1971–2014), American serial killer
- Kendall Fuller (born 1995), American football player
- Kendall Gammon (born 1968), American football player
- Kendall D. Garff (1906–1997), American businessman and car dealer
- Kendall Gender, Canadian drag performer
- Kendall Gill (born 1968), American basketball player
- Kendall Graveman (born 1990), American baseball player
- Kendall Gray (born 1992), American basketball player
- Kendall Grove (born 1982), American mixed martial artist
- Kendall Hailey, American writer
- Kendall Harmon (born 1960), American writer and priest
- Kendall Hart, fictional character in the soap opera All My Children
- Kendall Hinton (born 1997), American football player
- Kendall Holt (born 1981), American professional boxer
- Kendall Houk (born 1943), American chemist
- Kendall Hunter (born 1988), American football running back
- Kendall James (born 1991), American football player
- Kendall Jenner (born 1995), American model and TV personality
- Kendall Lamm (born 1992), American football player
- Kendall Langford (born 1986), American football player
- Kendall Marshall (born 1991), American basketball player
- Kendall McComas (1916–1981), American child actor
- Kendall Milton (born 2002), American football player
- Kendall Morton, Australian politician
- Kendall Myers (born 1937), American government official and spy
- Kendall Payne, American singer-songwriter
- Kendall Phillips (born 1991), American singer-songwriter and actor
- Kendall Reusing (born 1997), American grappler and practitioner of Brazilian jiu-jitsu
- Kendall Reyes (born 1989), American football player
- Kendall Ryan (cyclist) (born 1992), American racing cyclist
- Kendall Ryan (novelist) (born 1981), American novelist
- Kendall Schmidt (born 1990), American actor and singer
- G. Kendall Sharp (1934–2022), American judge
- Kendall Sheffield (born 1996), American football player
- Kendall Simmons (born 1979), American football player
- Kendall Snow, American politician
- Kendall Stephens (born 1994), American-Australian basketball player
- Kendall Taylor (1905–1999), British pianist
- Kendall Thomas, American law professor
- Kendall Walton (born 1939), American philosopher
- Kendall Waston (born 1988), Costa Rican footballer
- Kendall Wells, American softball player
- Kendall Williamson (born 1999), American football player
- Kendall Windham (born 1967), American professional wrestler
- Kendall Wright (born 1989), American football player

== Fictional characters ==
- Kendall Knight, in the American television series Big Time Rush
- Kendall Roy, protagonist of the American HBO television series Succession
- Kendall Spuckler, in the American animated television series The Simpsons

== See also ==
- Kendall (surname)
