= Kendrix =

Kendrix is a surname. Notable people with the surname include:

- Cory Kendrix (born 1988), American musician
- Gerrid Kendrix, American businessman, accountant, and politician
- Moss H. Kendrix (1917–1989), American public relations specialist

== See also ==
- Kendrix Morgan, Power Rangers character
- Kendrick (name)
