= Ken =

Ken or KEN may refer to:

== Entertainment ==
- Ken (album), a 2017 album by Canadian indie rock band Destroyer
- Ken (film), a 1965 Japanese film
- Ken (magazine), a large-format political magazine

== People ==
- Ken (given name), a list of people named Ken
- Ken (musician) (born 1968), guitarist of the Japanese rock band L'Arc-en-Ciel
- Ken (South Korean singer) (born 1992), stage name of Lee Jae-hwan of the South Korean boy group VIXX
- Felip (singer), member of SB19 who goes by stage name Ken
- Thomas Ken (1637-1711), bishop of Bath and Wells

== Other uses ==
- Kèn, a musical instrument from Vietnam
- Ken (doll), a product by Mattel
- Ken (unit) (間), a Japanese unit of measurement and proportion
- Ken River, a river in the Bundelkhand region, India
- Ken sword (剣), a Japanese sword
- Kensington railway station, Melbourne
- Komisja Edukacji Narodowej, Polish National Board of Education
- Ken (県), meaning "prefecture" in Japanese; see Prefectures of Japan
- Ken (拳), meaning "fist" in Japanese; see Sansukumi-ken for various hand gesture matching games
- Ken (Armenian letter) (Կ կ), the fifteenth letter of the Armenian alphabet
- KEN (ISO 3166-1 country code for Kenya)
- Kent, county in England, Chapman code

== See also ==
- Kendall (disambiguation), includes a list of people named Kendall
- Kenneth, includes a list of people and places named Kenneth or Ken
- Kenning (disambiguation)
- Kenny (disambiguation), includes a list of people named Kenny
