= Kedrick =

Kedrick is a given name. Notable people with the name include:

- Kedrick Brown (born 1981), American basketball player
- Kedrick Pickering (born 1958), British Virgin Islands politician

== See also ==
- Kendrick (name)
