= Kyndra =

Kyndra is a feminine given name. Notable people with the name include:

- Kyndra Rotunda (born 1973), American lawyer and writer
- Kyndra de St. Aubin, American broadcaster and sports commentator

== See also ==
- Kendra
