= Cináed =

Cináed is a Goidelic language male name, probably derived from the Brythonic language name Ciniod. The hypocoristic form may have been Cinadon. It is represented by the later Scottish name Kenneth and is not derived from the common Gaelic name Áed. It might refer to:

- Cinioch, son of Luchtren, (died 630s), King of the Picts
- Cináed mac Írgalaig (died 728), High King of Ireland
- Ciniod I of the Picts, son of Wrad, (died 775), King of the Picts
- Ciniod II of the Picts, son of Wrad son of Bargoit, (floruit circa 842), King of the Picts
- Cináed mac Conaing (died 851), king of Brega
- Cináed mac Ailpín (died 858), King of the Picts, a.k.a. Kenneth MacAlpin or Kenneth I of Scotland
- Cináed Ua Hartacáin (died 975), poet
- Cináed mac Maíl Coluim (died 995), King of Alba
- Cináed mac Duib (died 1005), King of Alba

== Etymology ==
The name Cináed originates with the Pictish name Ciniod. Although the Cin- element is uncertain, the -iod element may conserve Proto-Celtic *jʉ:ð, meaning "lord" (cf. Welsh Maredudd).
