= Kenning (disambiguation) =

Kenning is a circumlocution used instead of an ordinary noun in Old Norse and later Icelandic poetry.

Kenning may also refer to:

- Kenning (unit), an obsolete unit of dry measure in the Imperial system
- Kenning River, a tributary of the Case River in Canada

People with the surname Kenning or Kennings:

- Ethan Kenning (born 1943), American rock musician
- Tony Kenning, Def Leppard's original drummer
- Kodee Kennings, fictional girl
- Sir George Kenning, Derbyshire (UK) entrepreneur in the motor trade

== See also ==
- Ken (disambiguation)
