= Kendricks =

Kendricks is a surname of British origin, being a variant of the surname Kendrick. Notable people with the surname include:

- Eddie Kendricks (1939-1992), American singer and songwriter
- Eric Kendricks (born 1992), American football middle linebacker
- Lance Kendricks (born 1988), American football tight end
- Mychal Kendricks (born 1990), American football linebacker
- Sam Kendricks (born 1992), American pole vaulter

== See also ==
- Eddie Kendricks (album), an album by Eddie Kendricks
- Kendrick (name)
