= Ken Webster =

Ken Webster may refer to:

- Ken Webster (American football) (born 1996), American football cornerback
- Ken Webster (director) (born 1957), American actor and director
- Ken Webster (hypnotist) (born 1964), British hypnotist
