= Kenneth Murray =

Kenneth Murray or Ken Murray may refer to:

- Kenneth Murray (American football) (born 1998), American football linebacker
- Kenneth Murray (archaeologist) (1903–1972), English archaeologist
- Ken Murray (basketball player) (1928–2008), American basketball player
- Kenneth Murray (biologist) (1930–2013), English molecular biologist
- Ken Murray (entertainer) (1903–1988), American comedian
- Ken Murray (footballer) (1928–1993), English footballer
- Ken Murray (ice hockey) (born 1948), Canadian ice hockey player
- Ken Murray (physician), retired assistant professor of the University of Southern California
- Ken Murray (prison officer) (1931–2007), British prison officer and reformer
- Ken Murray (basketball coach), Canadian basketball coach
- Kenny Murray, Scottish rugby coach

== See also ==
- K. Gordon Murray (1922–1979), American producer
