= George Prentiss Kendrick =

American artist

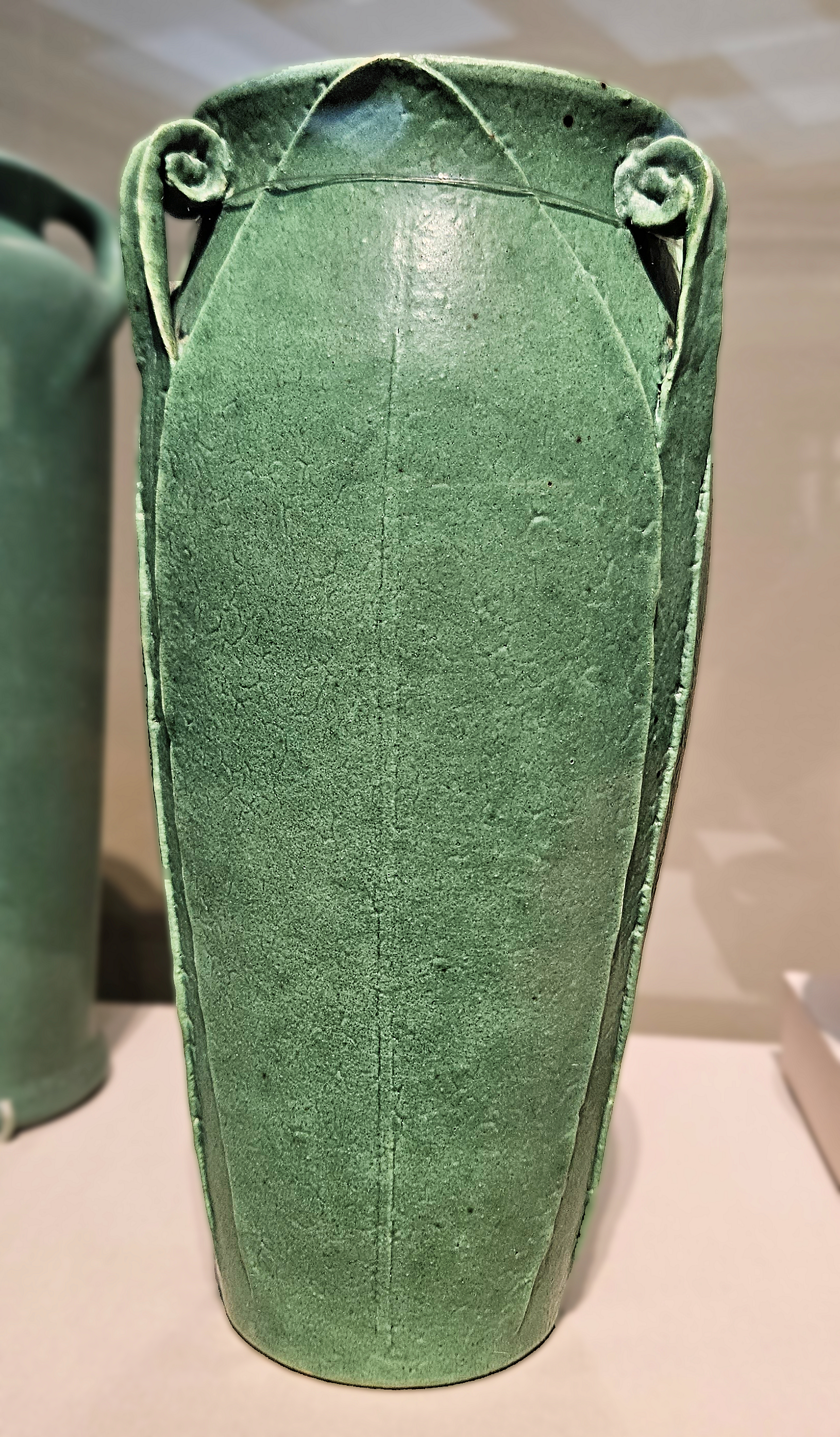
Vase design attributed to Kendrick, 1898-1900

George Prentiss Kendrick was an American artist, currently in the collections by Los Angeles County Museum of Art, Minneapolis Institute of Art, Virginia Museum of Fine Arts, The Metropolitan Museum of Art, The Art Institute of Chicago, National Museum of American History, Dallas Museum of Art and Victoria & Albert Museum.
