= Cappriccieo Scates =

American music industry executive (born 1969)

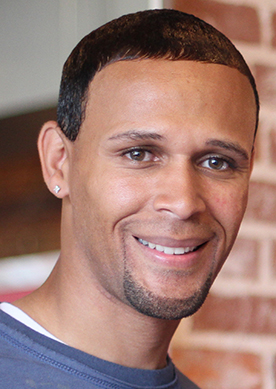
- Born: Cappriccieo M. Scates; May 23, 1969 (age 57); Chicago, Illinois, U.S.
- Other name: Capp
- Occupations: Record Executive, Author, Publisher
- Years active: 1991–present

Cappriccieo M. Scates (born May 23, 1969), also known as "Capp," is an American recording industry executive. Positions he has held include Regional Director of Business Development and Artist Relations at Sound Royalties, President and Chief Executive Officer at Mytrell Records, Executive General Manager at Arrow Records, Head of National Radio Promotions at Ruffhouse/Columbia Records, and Senior Director of Writer and Publisher Relations at SESAC. Scates once served as a United Nations (NGO) Ambassador to Vienna and is a multifaceted professional, holding titles such as author, music executive, professor, and Army veteran. Scates possesses advanced degrees, including an M.B.A. and J.D., and has earned a Ph.D. As the former Senior Director of Writer and Publisher Relations for SESAC, artists he has signed include Day26, RichGirl, Bone Crusher, Jacob Latimore, Rico Love, The Platinum Brothers and Travis Greene.

== Biography ==
Scates began his music career as a drummer. He later provided independent promotional services for Sony Music, Death Row Records, Tommy Boy Records, Universal Music Group, and Atlantic Records, working with artists such as Alicia Keys, Boyz II Men, and Bone Thugs-n-Harmony. He later became Director of National Radio Promotions for Ruffhouse/Columbia Records, where he worked with artists such as Fugees, Cypress Hill, and Kris Kross.

In 2006, Scates was named Associate Director of Writer/Publisher Relations for SESAC's first satellite office in Atlanta, GA, where he helped in recruiting of songwriters and publishers. Prior to joining SESAC, he was Director of Operations for PM Music Group, where he represented songwriters whose credits include Michael Jackson and Beyoncé. In addition, he is the author of “10 Steps to Successfully Managing Recording Artists: A Guide to Effective Artist Management,” "The 11th Step I Missed: 10 Steps to Successfully Managing Recording Artists," "Music and Culture: A Study of How Music Impacts the World," and "Royalty Roulette: Navigating the Complex Game of Music Publishing," which were published in October 2004, June 2018, July 2023, and February 2026 respectively.

Scates is a former member of the Atlanta Chapter Board of Governors for the National Academy of Recording Arts and Sciences (NARAS), and a member of the Atlanta Chapter Board for the National Association of Record Industry Professionals (NARIP). He is a former member of The Georgia Music Industry Task Force, which served as a consultant to Georgia Governor Sonny Perdue on the economic impact of music, film and entertainment during his last term in office.
