= Clare Kenny =

British-Swiss artist (born 1976)

- Born: 1976 (age 49–50); Manchester, United Kingdom
- Education: Chelsea School of Art, Lucerne University of Applied Sciences and Arts
- Known for: installation
- Website: https://clarekenny.com

Clare Kenny (born 11 January 1976, in Manchester) is a British-Swiss artist, best known for her use of building materials, neon lights, and photography in her contemporary art exhibitions and art installations. Based in Basel, she is a graduate of the Chelsea School of Art and Lucerne University of Applied Sciences and Arts and has been the twice recipient of the Kunstkredit Prize of the City of Basel in 2013 and 2017. Her works have been displayed at the Kunsthaus Zürich, the Aargauer Kunsthaus, and at Touchstones Rochdale. In 2013, she was a resident at the Cité internationale des arts in Paris.

== Selected exhibitions ==
- 2014: Monolithic Water, Group, Kunsthaus Zürich, Zürich
- 2016: DingDing, Group, Aargauer Kunsthaus, Aarau
- 2017: Industrial Romantic, Solo, Touchstones Rochdale, Manchester
- 2017: Arresting Fragments of the World, Group, Kunsthaus Langenthal, Langenthal
- 2019: If I was a Rich Girl, Solo, Kunst Raum Riehen, Riehen
- 2021: Put-To-Bed, Group, Last Tango, Zürich
- 2022: Birthmark, Solo, Gallery Gisele Linder, Basel

== Bibliography ==
- Clare Kenny: Industrial Romantic. Touchstones Rochdale. 2017. OCLC 1125344253.
- Hoffmann, Claire (2014). Monolithic water. Zürich: Zürcher Kunstgesellschaft. ISBN 978-3-906574-98-1.
