= Kenneth Platts =

British composer

Kenneth Platts (1946–1989) was a British composer.

He studied composition at the London College of Music with W. R. Pasfield and Lennox Berkeley. He is often classed as a composer of 'light music'. He wrote in an accessible style, and produced many works suitable for children and amateurs. His better-known compositions include a Concerto for Brass Band (?1978), a Sonatina (1979) for guitar, Delta Dances (1980) for wind band, and a Divertimento for string orchestra.
