= Thomas Kendrick =

Thomas Kendrick may refer to:

- T. D. Kendrick (Thomas Downing Kendrick, 1895–1979), British archaeologist and art historian
- Thomas Kendrick (agent) (1881–1972), British intelligence agent
- Thomas Kendrick (Medal of Honor) (1839–?), American sailor in the Union Navy during the Civil War
