= Mecury Kenny =

Zimbabwean cricketer (born 1979)

Personal information
- Born: 28 November 1979 (age 46); Bulawayo, Zimbabwe Rhodesia
- Batting: Right-handed
- Bowling: Right-arm off break
- Role: Bowling all-rounder

Domestic team information
- Years: Team
- 2000/01–2001/02: Matabeleland

Career statistics
Competition	FC
Matches	9
Runs scored	249
Batting average	19.15
100s/50s	0/1
Top score	57
Balls bowled	871
Wickets	16
Bowling average	33.31
5 wickets in innings	0
10 wickets in match	0
Best bowling	4/47
Catches/stumpings	7/–
- Source: ESPNcricinfo, 20 July 2021

Mecury Kenny (born 28 November 1979) is a former Zimbabwean cricketer. An all-rounder, he is a right-arm off break bowler and a right-handed batsman. He played nine first-class matches for Matabeleland in the Logan Cup from 2001 to 2002.
