= Ken Kwaku =

Ghanaian corporate governance expert

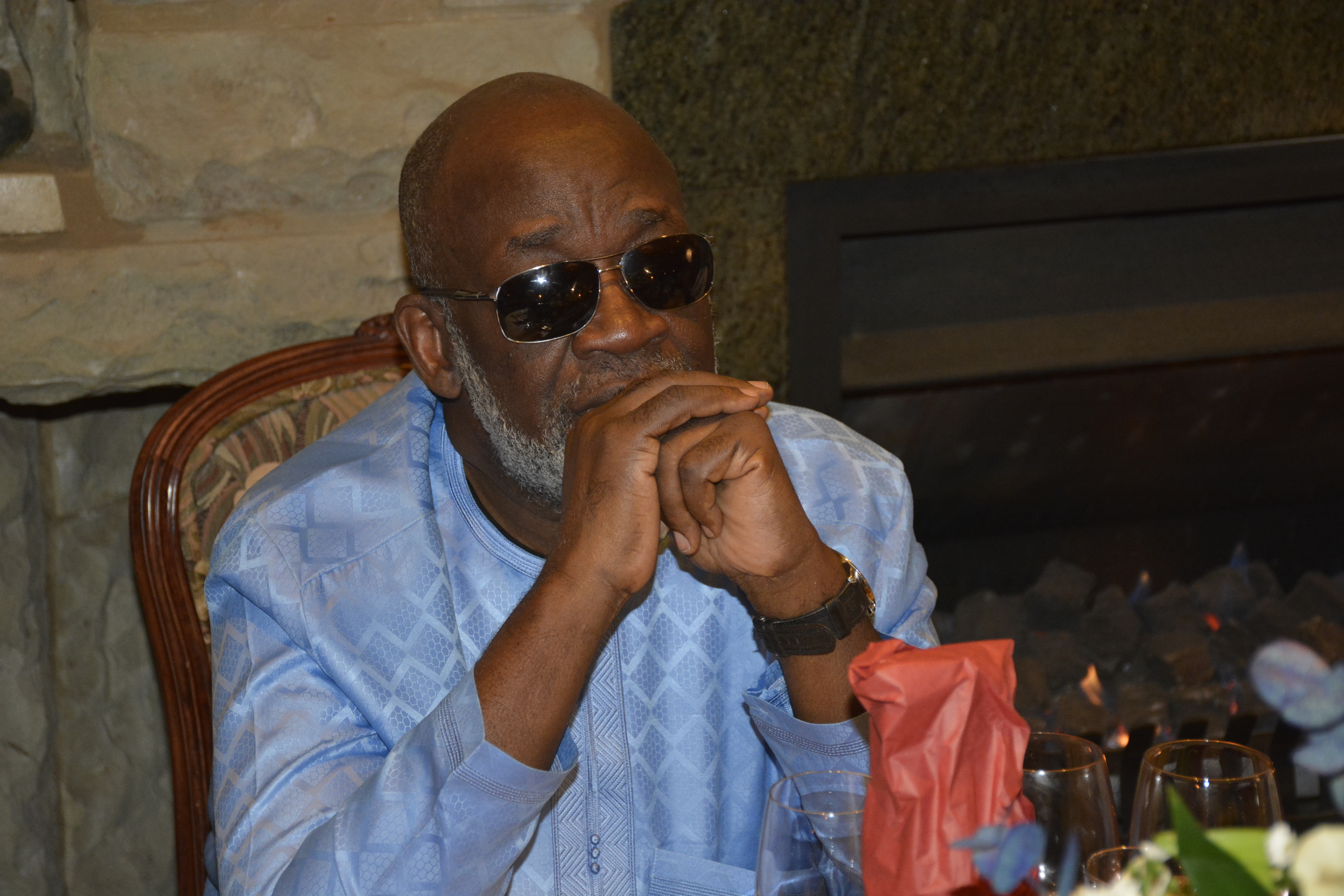
Dr. Ken Kwaku, Honorary Consul - General, Ghana -Tanzania

Dr. Ken Kwaku (born May 18, 1946) is an international investment and corporate governance expert. In 2013 he was nominated together with the late President of Ghana, Prof. John Evans Atta Mills for the Africa Achievers Award. This recognition stemmed from his track record in the area of business development and the unearthing of leadership potentials across Africa. He is Ghana's Honorary Consular to Tanzania and a special adviser to the former president, H.E. Benjamin Mkapa.

== Family ==
His mother, madam Rebecca Rosebud Agroh was born on 5 May 1925 to the late Jonathan Brandsford Agroh of Have Agorme and Maria Agroh (Nee Tsitsimboe) of Vakpo Kpodzi all in the Volta Region of Ghana. She attended primary and secondary schools in Ho, Amedzofe and Peki. In Peki however, she enjoyed the company of the late Mrs. Esther Ocloo (Nee Nkulenu), the renowned female entrepreneur of her time.

After a brief stay in Hohoe as a nurse and as a teacher, she joined the then Department of Social Welfare and Community Development in 1954. She worked and retired from the Department of Community Development in May 1988 with the rank of Assistant Director.

Her work and passion for women's development took her to many parts of Ghana including Kete Krachi, Worawora, Jasikan, Ho and Tsito, all in the Volta Region, Bolgatanga in the Upper East Region, Sunyani in the Brong Ahafo Region, Kumasi in the Ashanti Region, and Madina in the Greater Accra Region. She also went beyond the borders of Ghana doing consultancies for the United Nations Development Program (UNDP) and the United Nations Economic Commission for Africa (UNECA). Between 1976 and 1978, she worked as a consultant with women in Lesotho, Swaziland, South Africa Homelands and Israel.

As part of her desire to constantly improve her own skills, madam Agroh took several courses in Mass Education and Community Development at the University of Ghana and Connecticut College, in New London, USA.

Kwaku's father, Tennyson Emmanuel Kwaku, was born on 13 December 1924 and died on 21 November 1994. His father, Francis Elliot Kwaku was an Mfantsipim and Achimota trained teacher. He was the second born of 4 children – Matilda, Tennyson, Samuel and William. As did his other male siblings he had his secondary education at Achimota School from where he proceeded to do his inter BA in the newly established University College of the Gold Coast in 1948. At Achimota School, his classmates included eminent Ghanaian scholars like Alex Kwapong (first indigenous Vice Chancellor of the University of Ghana), R.R Amponsah (Minister under the Second Republic), and K.B Asante (Secretary to Osagyefo Dr. Kwame Nkrumah) among others.

He also served as a government agent (District Commissioner) in the Keta District before proceeding to England to read law which he did at the Middle Temple Inns of Court. He returned to Ghana in 1957 having qualified as a solicitor and a barrister and the first Ghanaian attorney with specialization in transport law. He was appointed chairman of the Black Star Line (National Shipping Line) in 1966 because of his background in transport law.

== Early life and education ==
Kwaku lived the early part of his life in Have in the Volta Region of Ghana where he had his basic education before proceeding to Achimota School. He was the best Geography student in West Africa in the 1966 A level examinations. In 1967, he won a Commonwealth Scholarship to McGill University for his bachelor's degree; he graduated with a First Class Honors in Economics and Political Science from McGill University in 1970. He then proceeded to the University of Toronto for graduate studies under several academic scholarships. Kwaku also attended the Harvard Graduate School of Business where he obtained a certificate in Management Development in 1987. He launched his career after obtaining his MA and PhD in Political Economy from University of Toronto.

== Professional life ==
His work has included being a university professor, policy adviser to many African governments and over three decades of service at the World Bank Group (WBG) to name a few. He was a lecturer at the University of Guyana (Georgetown) in the Caribbean between 1975-1976; he taught Economic Theory, International Trade, Economic Development, Public Policy and International Relations.

Kwaku served with the WBG from 1976 - 2004 and held positions including Chief Multilateral Investment Guarantee Agency (MIGA) Africa Representative 2002 - 2004 and Manager for Africa 1998 - 2002. Between 1995 and 1998, he was seconded from the WBG as Adviser to the Namibian Government. He was also a member of the Nomination and Remuneration Committee of the WBG and retired from the WBG as the Africa Director for MIGA in 2004. During his time at MIGA, he pioneered African- Asian business linkages as well as investment in Africa's Mining and Tourism sectors.

Since retiring he has also been an adviser to a number of African governments and corporations. Some of these countries include Tanzania, and Namibia. Specifically, Kwaku has been an economic advisor to Presidents Nujoma of Namibia, as well as Kikwete and Mkapa of Tanzania.

He has also been serving as Ghana's Honorary Consul - General in Tanzania since retiring as his way of giving back to his beloved country.

== Awards and recognition ==
Woodrow Wilson Fellowship, Ford Foundation Fellowship, McGill University and University of Toronto Open Fellowships, World Bank Excellence Award, Africa Achievers Award for Excellence in International Corporate Governance

In January 2023, Kwaku was recognized and listed among the 100 most reputable Africans.
