= Kendra =

Female name

- Pronunciation: KEN-drah
- Gender: Female

Origin
- Origin: Anglo-Saxon; Curonian; Scottish Gaelic
- Meaning: (Disputed) greatest champion

Kendra is a female name of disputed origins. Kendra is a moderately popular female first name, ranking 403 out of 4,275 for females of all ages in the 1990 U.S. Census. The name was at its most popular in the United States from the mid-1980s to mid-1990s, peaking in 1987. It is the female form of Kendrick.

== People ==
- Kendra Brooks (born 1972), American politician
- Kendra Harrison (born 1992), American hurdler
- Kendra James (died 2003) African American woman shot dead by a police officer
- Kendra Moore, American politician
- Kendra Moyle (born 1990), American competitive pair skater
- Kendra Jade Rossi (born 1977), American model, actress, and former adult film star
- Kendra Scott (born 1974), American jewelry designer, CEO
- Kendra Smith (born 1960), American musician
- Kendra Spears, birth name of Salwa Aga Khan (born 1988), American model and royal member of the Noorani family
- Kendra Sunderland (born 1995), American adult film star and webcam model
- Kendra Wilkinson (born 1985), a former girlfriend of Hugh Hefner and reality star
- Kendra Woodland (born 2000), Canadian ice hockey player

== Fiction ==
- Kendra Daynes, White House Counsel in season 2 of Designated Survivor
- Kendra Dumbledore, mother of Albus Dumbledore, a character in the Harry Potter novels
- Kendra Krinklesac, a character from the spin-off The Cleveland Show
- Kendra Mason, a character from the TV series Degrassi: The Next Generation
- Kendra Saunders, a DC Comics superheroine, known as Hawkgirl
- Kendra Shaw, a character from the reimagined TV series Battlestar Galactica
- Kendra Sorenson, a character in the Fablehaven series
- Kendra Young, a character from the TV series Buffy the Vampire Slayer
