= Kendall Harmon =

American priest

The Rev. Canon Kendall Harmon
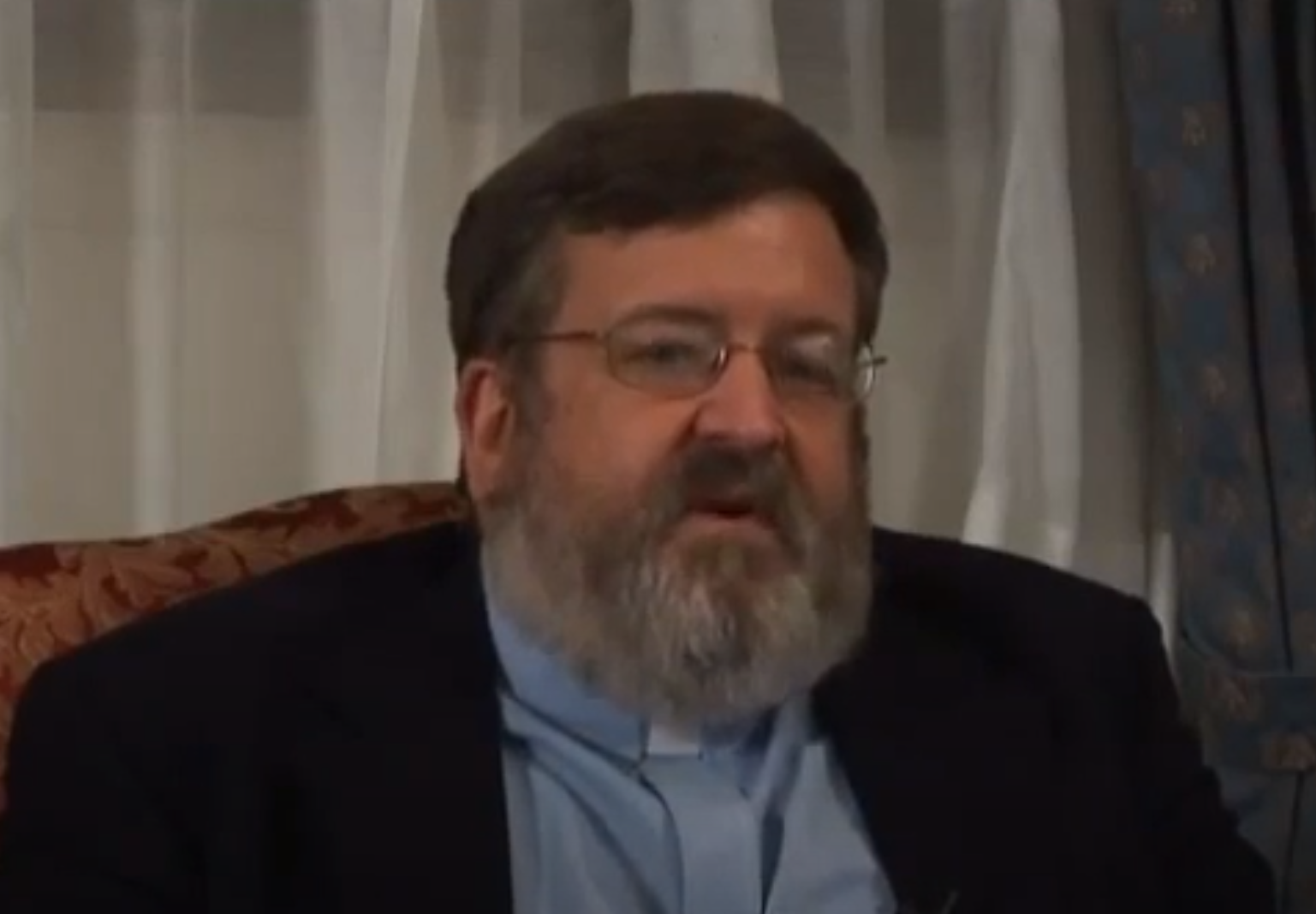
- Harmon interviewed in a 2005 Anglican Communion Network documentary.
- Born: 1960 (age 65–66)
- Education: Bowdoin College; Regent College; Trinity School for Ministry; University of Oxford
- Occupations: Anglican Communion Development Director, Anglican Diocese of South Carolina
- Notable work: Finally Excluded from God
- Children: 3

Kendall S. Harmon (born 1960) is a writer and priest of the Anglican Church in North America. Formerly a leading traditional theologian with the Episcopal Church, Harmon is known for his activity, writing, and commentary on matters related to homosexuality and the Anglican church in the years prior to, during, and following the schism of the Episcopal Church and the subsequent formation of the Anglican Church in North America.

== Early life and education ==
Harmon studied at Bowdoin College and Regent College in Vancouver, Canada and the Trinity School for Ministry in Ambridge, Pennsylvania.

In 1993, he received a doctoral degree from Oxford University for his dissertation on aspects of the doctrine of Hell in regards to Universalism.

== Career ==
Harmon worked at Holy Comforter in Sumter, South Carolina in the 1980s and St. Paul's Episcopal Church in Summerville, South Carolina in the 1990s.

In 2002, Harmon began serving as Canon Theologian for the Anglican Diocese of the South . He also served as the Assistant Rector for Yonges Island, Christ St. Paul's Church.

In 2009, following the schism in the Episcopal Church that led to the formation of the Anglican Church in North America, Harmon was appointed as the Anglican Communion Development Director in the Anglican Diocese of South Carolina, where he also works in media relations. Harmon was a leader of the American Anglican Council.

In 1991, Harmon presented the paper "The Case against Conditionalism: A Response to Edward William Fudge", defending a traditional Christian view of hell, at the Fourth Edinburgh Conference on Christian Dogmatics in 1991, in disagreement with Edward Fudge's book The Fire That Consumes.

=== Traditional Anglican writing and activism ===
Harmon operates the blog TitusOneNine, which is frequented by those who follow and comment upon Anglican and Episcopal affairs.

Harmon has remarked upon changes to the 1979 Book of Common Prayer, the ordination of women, sex outside of marriage and homosexuality with conservative Christian views. Harmon regularly remarked upon the state of the Christianity and the Episcopal Church leading up to the schism.

Harmon wrote a booklet, A Deeply Disturbing Document: A Comprehensive Critique of the Episcopal Church Curriculum Sexuality: A Divine Gift, denouncing the Episcopal educational booklet Sexuality: A Divine Gift, A Sacramental Approach to Human Sexuality and Family Life and was often quoted in the news after the booklet's circulation. Bishop C. Fitzsimmons Allison praised and partially credited Harmon for the rejection of Sexuality: A Divine Gift by the Episcopal General Convention. Harmon also criticized another piece of sexual educational media, About Your Sexuality.

Harmon campaigned against the election of Barbara Harris as bishop of the Diocese of Massachusetts in 1988. He opined on Harris, a black woman, campaigning that she was angry, uneducated, inexperienced, and extremist.

Harmon criticized the ordination of Robert Williams in "Should a Practicing Homosexual be Ordained in the Episcopal Church Today?," an editorial published in church newsletter Jubilate Deo in February 1990. His 2005 article "Anglicanism at the Crossroads", in which he detailed a conservative Christian view of homosexuality's incompatibility with biblical scripture, appeared in The Guardian.

In 2004, he commented on the increased number of same-sex union ceremonies within the church. He decried the election of homosexual bishops Gene Robinson in 2003 and Mary Douglas Glasspool in 2009. Following the election of Robinson at the 2003 General Convention of the Episcopal Church, he read a statement on behalf of the conservatives that claimed that the church had left the Anglican faith. Harmon called for the intervention of the Archbishop of Canterbury. In 2007, Rowan Williams, the Archbishop of Canterbury, chaired a group that assessed the U.S. Episcopal Church's supporting for gay clergy and congregation; Harmon deemed the group's concluding report "poor". Harmon also objected to the 2009 election of Thew Forrester, who practiced Zen Buddhism and amended the liturgy without approval.

In 2006, Harmon campaigned that an internal Episcopal committee reviewing anti-Semitism be limited only to the liturgy and not to scripture. He was unsuccessful. Following the 2007 funeral of former United States President Gerald Ford, Harmon criticized Rev. Robert Certain's truncation of scripture in the gospel reading. In 2008, he objected to Lenten liturgical changes promoted by the Church.

== Personal life ==
He is married to a nurse practitioner named Elizabeth; they have three children.

== Works ==
- "Should Practicing Homosexual Persons be Ordained in the Episcopal Church Today?" Shaker Heights, Ohio: Episcopalians United, 1991. [Contributor] [excerpt]
- Finally Excluded from God?: Some Twentieth Century Theological Explorations of the Problem of Hell and Universalism with Reference to the Historical Development of These Doctrines. 1993 D.Phil. from Oxford University [Dissertation]
- "Nothingness and Human Destiny: Hell in the Thought of C.S. Lewis," in David Mills, ed., The Pilgrim's Guide: C.S. Lewis and the Art of Witness (Eerdmans, 1998). ISBN 0-8028-3777-8. [Contributor]
