= William Kenrick =

William Kenrick may refer to:

- William Kenrick (Member of Barebone's Parliament), MP for Kent (UK Parliament constituency)
- William Kenrick (writer) (1725–1779), English novelist, playwright and satirist
- William Kenrick (nurseryman) (1795–1872), American nurseryman
- William Kenrick (1774–1829), English MP for Bletchingley 1806–14, Master of the King's Household 1810–12
- William Kenrick (Birmingham MP) (1831–1919), Lord Mayor of Birmingham, MP for Birmingham North 1885–99
