= Ken Matthews =

Ken Matthews may refer to:

- Ken Matthews (race walker)
- Ken Matthews (radio)
- Ken Matthews (public servant)
