= John Kendrick =

John Kendrick may refer to:

- John Kendrick (cloth merchant) (1573–1624), English cloth merchant
- John Kendrick (lord mayor) (died 1661), Lord Mayor of London in 1652
- John Kendrick (American sea captain) (1740–1794), American sea captain
- John Kendrick Jr., his son, maritime fur trader, merchant and Spanish Navy officer
- John Kendrick (Connecticut politician) (1825–1877), Connecticut state legislator and mayor
- John Allen Kendrick (1897–1960), American criminal and bank robber
- John B. Kendrick (1857–1933), United States Senator from Wyoming
- John Whitefield Kendrick (1917–2009), American economist
- John William Kendrick (1853–1924), American railway executive
- John Kendrick (cashier), first Chief Cashier of the Bank of England
