= Kenneth Klassen =

Canadian convicted child sex offender from British Columbia

- Born: 1951 (age 74–75); Burnaby, British Columbia, Canada
- Occupation: Art dealer
- Known for: Videotaping himself sexually abusing children
- Status: In prison
- Convictions: Child pornography Child sex tourism
- Penalty: 11 years' imprisonment

Kenneth Klassen (born 1951) is a Canadian convicted child sex offender from Burnaby, British Columbia.

Starting at the age of 27 or 28, Klassen began sexually abusing children and continued doing so for more than 25 years. He sexually abused fourteen children as a sex tourist in Cambodia and Colombia between December 1998 and March 2002 and videotaped himself while doing so. The victims were all less than 14 years old, and they ranged in age to as young as 8 years old.

In 2010, he was convicted of having engaged in child sex tourism and having broken Canada's child pornography laws. Klassen was sentenced to eleven years in prison, which was, at the time, the harshest sentence anyone had ever received for breaking Canada's law against sex tourism. The law came into force thirteen years before Klassen's conviction, and only two other people had been convicted under that law in that time.

An article about Klassen's sex crimes, written by journalist Daphne Bramham for The Vancouver Sun, was nominated for the Beyond Borders media award for exceptional coverage of issues related child sexual exploitation.
