= Ken Murray (physician) =

American physician

Ken Murray is a retired family medical doctor who had a private practice of general medicine in Studio City, California for about 25 years, until his retirement in 2006. He also held a Clinical Assistant Professorship in Family Medicine at the University of Southern California, until his retirement.

Murray is most notable for the national attention created by the publication of his article on end-of-life issues, titled "How Doctors Die", which went viral on the internet. It generated a national conversation on issues related to patient wishes at their end of life, and quality issues related to that. He has also been a long-time commentator on health care systems, particularly managed care.

Murray has been interviewed widely, such as NPR, the New York Times, and physician education sites. Murray was also a reviewer for "How To Report Statistics in Medicine:Annotated Guidelines for Authors, Editors, and Reviewers", by Lang and Secic, an important reference in preparing and writing scientific literature articles.

Murray was previously a physician advisor/editor for the now defunct "Weekly Briefings From the New England Journal of Medicine" He was a founder of Lakeside Medical Group in Burbank, California, served on its board for 25 years, and on the boards of several of its derivative organizations, was and corporate officer, and was a medical director for many years.

Murray's lifelong interest in clean water has led him to work as a wilderness ranger in the High Sierra (California's ultimate water source), and he has served in a volunteer advisory capacity to the Los Angeles Department of Water and Power's Recycled Water Advisory Board. He also serves on the Integrated Resources Plan for the City of Los Angeles, integrating water management for the city. As part of that committee, he was jointly awarded the 2011 United States Water Prize.
