= Michael Kenny =

Michael, Mick or Mike Kenny may refer to:

- Michael Kenny (boxer) (1964–2024), New Zealand boxer
- Michael Kenny (sculptor) (1941–1999), English sculptor
- Michael Kenny (political scientist), professor of public policy at the University of Cambridge
- Michael Daedalus Kenny, comic book illustrator, storyboard artist and director
- Michael Hughes Kenny (1937–1995), Roman Catholic bishop of Juneau, Alaska
- Mike Kenny (writer), British playwright
- Mick Kenny (Kilkenny hurler) (1925–2003), played in the 1950s, Irish name Mícheál Ó Cionnaith
- Mick Kenny (Galway hurler) (1893–1959), played in the 1910s and 1920s
- Mike Kenny (swimmer) (born 1945), British Paralympic swimmer
- Michael Kenny, character in Sister Kenny
- Mike Kenny (sprinter), winner of the 1970 distance medley relay at the NCAA Division I Indoor Track and Field Championships

== See also ==
- Michael Kenney of Iron Maiden
- Mick Kenney (born 1980), English musician, artist, and producer
