= Kenny Bates =

American stuntman, film producer, and actor

Kenneth W. Bates is an American stuntman, film producer, second unit director, and actor, best known for his work with Steven Spielberg, Michael Bay, and Jerry Bruckheimer.

== Life and career ==
In 1988, Bates was the stunt double for Alan Rickman in the film Die Hard during the scene where the latter's character, Hans Gruber, falls to his death. Bates then became one of few stuntman to win an Academy Award for such a feat.

In 2004, when Bates could not find an existing high-speed camera vehicle that could shoot dynamic, low to the ground car chase sequences, he developed and created his own, the versatile Gas Go-Kart and Electric-Kart so he could film his high-octane action sequences. He later founded PFA Prague Film Associates with producer Tomas Rotnagl.

In 2023, Bates joined the production crew of the upcoming Bollywood film NTR 30.

He is also a frequent collaborator of Michael Bay's, having directed second unit on almost all of his films, including first three Transformers movies, Bad Boys 1, The Rock, Armageddon, The Island, and Pearl Harbor, the latter of which won him a Taurus World Stunt Award for "Best 2nd Unit Director".

== Filmography ==
| Year | Title | Stunts | Second unit director | Producer | Director |
|---|---|---|---|---|---|
| 1988 | Rambo III | Yes | No | No | Peter MacDonald |
| 1988 | Die Hard | Yes | No | No | John McTiernan |
| 1989 | Star Trek V: The Final Frontier | Yes | No | No | William Shatner |
| 1990 | Another 48 Hrs. | Yes | No | No | Walter Hill |
| 1990 | Die Hard 2 | Yes | No | No | Renny Harlin |
| 1991 | Fast Getaway | Yes | Yes | No | Spiro Razatos |
| 1992 | Lethal Weapon 3 | Yes | No | No | Richard Donner |
| 1993 | Loaded Weapon 1 | Yes | No | No | Gene Quintano |
| 1994 | The Crow | Yes | No | No | Alex Proyas |
| 1994 | On Deadly Ground | Yes | No | No | Steven Seagal |
| 1994 | Class of 1999 II: The Substitute | Yes | No | No | Spiro Razatos |
| 1994 | The Shadow | Yes | No | No | Russell Mulcahy |
| 1994 | The Mask | Yes | No | No | Chuck Russell |
| 1994 | Street Fighter | Yes | No | No | Steven E. de Souza |
| 1995 | Bad Boys | Yes | Yes | No | Michael Bay |
| 1996 | The Rock | Yes | Yes | Associate producer | Michael Bay |
| 1997 | Con Air | Yes | Yes | Associate producer | Simon West |
| 1998 | Armageddon | Yes | Yes | Associate producer | Michael Bay |
| 2001 | Pearl Harbor | Yes | Yes | Associate producer | Michael Bay |
| 2001 | The Fast and The Furious | Yes | No | No | Rob Cohen |
| 2001 | Training Day | Yes | Yes | No | Antoine Fuqua |
| 2002 | Changing Lanes | No | Yes | No | Roger Michell |
| 2002 | Bad Company | Yes | Yes | Associate producer | Joel Schumacher |
| 2002 | The Hours | No | Yes | No | Stephen Daldry |
| 2003 | The Italian Job | Yes | Yes | No | F. Gary Gray |
| 2003 | The Movie Hero | Yes | No | No | Brad T. Gottfred |
| 2003 | The Texas Chainsaw Massacre | No | Yes | No | Marcus Nispel |
| 2005 | The Island | Yes | Yes | Associate producer | Michael Bay |
| 2006 | The Texas Chainsaw Massacre: The Beginning | Yes | No | No | Jonathan Liebesman |
| 2007 | Transformers | Yes | Yes | Co-producer | Michael Bay |
| 2007 | Rush Hour 3 | Yes | No | No | Brett Ratner |
| 2008 | Babylon A.D. | Yes | Yes | No | Mathieu Kassovitz |
| 2009 | Transformers: Revenge of the Fallen | Yes | Yes | Co-producer | Michael Bay |
| 2010 | G-Force | Yes | Yes | No | Hoyt Horatio Yeatman Jr. |
| 2011 | Transformers: Dark of the Moon | Yes | Yes | Co-producer | Michael Bay |
| 2011 | Mission: Impossible – Ghost Protocol | Yes | No | No | Brad Bird |
| 2013 | Pain and Gain | Yes | Yes | No | Michael Bay |
| 2014 | Kingsman: The Secret Service | No | Yes | No | Matthew Vaughn |
| 2016 | 13 Hours: The Secret Soldiers of Benghazi | No | No | Co-producer | Michael Bay |
| 2018 | The Catcher Was a Spy | Yes | Yes | No | Ben Lewin |
| 2018 | 2.0 | Yes | Yes | No | S. Shankar |
| 2019 | Saaho | Yes | Action unit director | Action unit producer | Sujeeth Reddy |
| 2019 | 6 Underground | Yes | Yes | No | Michael Bay |
| 2023 | Joel D. Wynkoop's 187 Times the Movie | No | No | Yes | Joel D. Wynkoop |
