= Brian Kenny =

Brian Kenny may refer to:

- Brian Kenny (artist) (born 1982), American multimedia artist
- Brian Kenny (British Army officer) (1934–2017), British Army General
- Brian Kenny (politician), Liberal member of the Legislative Assembly of New Brunswick
- Brian Kenny (sportscaster) (born 1963), MLB Network personality and journalist
- Brian Kenny (hurler) (1938–2022), Irish hurler
