= Myra Miller =

Black food entrepreneur and baker based in Atlanta, Georgia

- Born: 1811
- Died: 1891
- Resting place: Oakland Cemetery
- Occupations: Baker, traiteur, entrepreneur

Myra Miller (c. 1811–1891) was an African-American food entrepreneur and baker in Atlanta during Reconstruction.

Miller was born in Virginia in about 1811. She was enslaved and sold as a cook to someone in Rome, Georgia. In 1871, after slavery was abolished in the United States, she moved with her husband to Atlanta and started a bakery. Miller's bakery was well known in Atlanta and her wedding fruitcakes were sent across the country. Miller died in 1891 and was buried in the African American section of Oakland Cemetery.
