= List of Tokyo Revengers characters =

This is a list of characters of the manga series Tokyo Revengers.

== Tokyo Manji Gang ==
Tokyo Manji Gang banner

Takemichi Hanagaki (花垣 武道, Hanagaki Takemichi)
Voiced by: Yuuki Shin (Japanese); A.J. Beckles (English)
Portrayed by: Takumi Kitamura (film), Tsubasa Kizu (stage play)
Takemichi is the main protagonist of the series. Takemichi was a 26-year old freeter living his life in a daze. While watching the news, he learned that his former girlfriend, Hinata Tachibana, and her brother, Naoto, were killed in a conflict caused by the Tokyo Manji Gang, which left him severely depressed. Later while taking the train he was pushed off onto the train tracks where he end up time leaping twelve years into the past back to when he was still in middle school. During this time Takemichi ends up meeting Hinata's brother Naoto where he tells him about how he ended up being pushed off onto the train and that Naoto and Hinata will die twelve years in the future and shakes hands with Naoto causing him to travel back to the present where he was saved by Naoto who was now alive and working as a police officer. Naoto then explained to Takemichi about his time-leaping abilities and convinced him to time leap to the past to save Hinata to which he agreed and began a personal mission to save Hinata from dying.
Manjirō Sano (佐野 万次郎, Sano Manjirō) / Mikey (マイキー, Maikī)
Voiced by: Yū Hayashi (Japanese); Aleks Le, Casey Mongillo (young) (English)
Portrayed by: Ryo Yoshizawa (film), Ryo Matsuda (stage play)
The leader of Tokyo Manji Gang, also known as Toman, nicknamed Mikey. A gang known for it honorable ideals and beliefs, aiming to reach the goal of establishing a new golden era for delinquents in the Kanto region. However, this image crumbled as its ranks were continually corrupted and transformed into a criminal organization that took the lives of innocent civilians in the present day. During the time, he met Takemichi and befriended him after witnessing his resolution whilst fighting against Kiyomasa. After the conflict with Moebius, he invited Takemichi to join the gang as he saved Draken when he was stabbed during the conflict. During the conflict against Tenjiku, Mikey learned about Takemichi's time leaping and after that, to ensure a better future for everyone, he decided to disband Toman and to distance himself from his friends because of a dark impulse inside him that he couldn't control. Two years after the conflict he founded the Kanto Manji Gang. During the present timeline he is the leader of a criminal organization known as Bonten, which is what Toman was before in the Present Timeline.
Ken Ryūgūji (龍宮寺 堅, Ryūgūji Ken) / Draken (ドラケン, Doraken)
Voiced by: Tatsuhisa Suzuki (first season), Masaya Fukunishi (second season; Blu-ray) (Japanese); Sean Chiplock (English)
Portrayed by: Yūki Yamada (film), Shō Jinnai (stage play)
The Vice Captain of the Tokyo Manji Gang. He is Mikey's best friend and is known for his mature and big brother attitude, he also befriended Takemichi when witnessing his resolution whilst fighting Kiyomasa. During the conflict against Moebious he was stabbed by Kiyomasa and died in first timeline but Takemichi saved him and he survived. In the second present timeline he was on death row for committing various murders under the orders of Kisaki. Later during Tenjiku where Emma, Mikey's younger sister was killed by Kisaki which left Mikey and Draken devastated. Later Draken learned about Takemichi's time leaping and believed it after seeing Takemichi's frantic behavior many times.
Tetta Kisaki (稀咲 鉄太, Kisaki Tetta)
Voiced by: Showtaro Morikubo (Japanese); Nicolas Roye (English)
Portrayed by: Shotaro Mamiya, Kazuya Yuuki (stage play)
Is one of Top Admins of the Tokyo Manji Gang in the present timeline and responsible for giving the order to murder Hinata Tachibana in multiple timelines. He plotted various things in order to take control of the Tokyo Manji Gang such as instigating Kiyomasa's stabbing of Draken in order to take over as the vice captain of the Tokyo Manji Gang but this was thwarted by Takemichi when he save Draken from dying. So instead he ended up becoming the Captain of the Third Division of the gang succeeding Pah-chin who turned himself in to the police. However after the conflict against the 10th Generation Black Dragon he was kicked out from Toman by Mikey. As a result Kisaki turns to Izana Kurokawa and joined Tenjiku and then personally killed Mikey's sister Emma in order to break Mikey's spirit and make Izana Mikey's emotional support. However, Tenjiku lost against Toman which caused him to kill Izana and attempt to flee. During his confrontation with Takemichi, he reveals his romantic obsession with Hina and aims to become the Top Delinquent to earn her love and propose to her but she rejected him due her feeling for Takemichi which was the reason why he ordered Hinata's murder, unable to accept Hinata's rejection. Takemichi, enraged by Kisaki's motive, took his gun intending to kill him so Hina would be alive in the present. However, as Kisaki attempted to escape he end up getting hit by a truck and died as result.
Keisuke Baji (場地 圭介, Baji Keisuke)
Voiced by: Masaaki Mizunaka (Japanese); Lucien Dodge (English)
Portrayed by: Kento Nagayama (film), Kandai Ueda (stage play)
The Captain of the First Division of the Tokyo Manji Gang and one of the founding members of the Tokyo Manji Gang. He is a very loyal member of the gang and devoted to maintaining the gang's ideals. During the time he and Kazutora planned to break in and steal motorbike from a motorbike shop as a present for Mikey's birthday. However, unknown to him and Kazutora, the shop belonged to Mikey's older brother Shinichiro. After Shinichiro caught the two trying to steal the bike, Kazutora accidentally killed him before Baji could explain who he was. During the conflict between Toman and Valhalla, Baji seemingly switched sides to Valhalla. In reality, Baji joined in order to learn more about Kisaki. At the fight between the two gangs, Kazutora stabs Baji for betraying Valhalla. Before dying, Baji choose to kill himself, so Kazutora wouldn't be held responsible for his death. Mikey, enraged over Baji's death, nearly kills Kazutora before Takemichi intervenes while invoking Baji's wish in forgiving Kazutora.
Takashi Mitsuya (三ツ谷 隆, Mitsuya Takashi)
Voiced by: Yoshitsugu Matsuoka (Japanese); Grant George (English)
Portrayed by: Gordon Maeda (film), Rita Aizawa (stage play)
The Captain of the Second Division of the Tokyo Manji Gang.
Hakkai Shiba (柴 八戒, Shiba Hakkai)
Voiced by: Tasuku Hatanaka (Japanese); Landon McDonald (English)
The Vice Captain of the Second Division of the Tokyo Manji Gang. He is the younger brother of Taiju and Yuzuha. In an alternative present timeline he was an Admin of Toman and the 11th Generation Leader of the Black Dragon for apparently killing Taiju. During the Christmas Conflict it was reveal Hakkai planned to kill Taiju but failed and it was Yuzuha who killed Taiju, as penance for the abuse Yuzuha and Hakkai went through. Taiju tried his best look after them but ended up physically abusing them but Takemichi prevented this and Taiju managed to survive. When Hakkai tried to muster his resolve to kill Taiju but Takemichi stopped him and convinced him to stand up for himself in order to protect Yuzuha and face Taiju. After holding his ground. soon Mikey and Draken arrived and Mikey defeated Taiju with one blow and Draken defeated all other members of the Black Dragons.
Haruki Hayashida (林田 春樹, Hayashida Haruki)
Voiced by: Subaru Kimura (Japanese); Chris Hackney (English)
Portrayed by: Kazuki Horike (film), Daichi Nakajima (stage play)
The Captain of the Third Division of the Tokyo Manji Gang. During the conflict against Moebius Pah-chin stab the leader of Moebius before staying behind to turn himself in. His arrest cause internal conflict within Toman.
Ryōhei Hayashi (林 良平, Hayashi Ryōhei)
Voiced by: Yukihiro Nozuyama
Portrayed by: Bishin Kawasumi (stage play)
The Vice Captain of the Third Division of the Tokyo Manji Gang.
Nahoya Kawata (河田 ナホヤ, Kawata Nahoya)
Voiced by: Kengo Kawanishi (Japanese); Bryce Papenbrook (English)
The Fourth Division Captain of the Tokyo Manji Gang. He is the older twin brother of Souya Kawata.
Yasuhiro Mutō (武藤 泰宏, Mutō Yasuhiro)
Voiced by: Daisuke Ono (Japanese); Landon McDonald (English)
Is the Captain of the Fifth Division.
Shuji Hanma (半間 修二, Hanma Shūji)
Voiced by: Takuya Eguchi (Japanese); Zeno Robinson (English)
Portrayed by: Hiroya Shimizu (film), Shūji Kikuchi (stage play)
A tall and aggressive man with tattoos of sin and punishment on both hands. He was working with Kisaki, and when Kisaki received his expulsion, he took the Rikubandai with him and went through the East Manji.
Chifuyu Matsuno (松野 千冬, Matsuno Chifuyu)
Voiced by: Shō Karino (Japanese); Adam McArthur (English)
Portrayed by: Mahiro Takasugi (film), Keisuke Ueda (stage play)
The Vice Captain of the First Division of the Tokyo Manji Gang. Chifuyu help Baji in joining Valhalla by let himself get beaten up by him so Baji can prove his loyalty. In the Aftermath of Baji's death he nominated Takemichi to suceading Baji as the captain of 1st Division. Later Takemichi later reveal to Chifuyu about his time leap powers and agreed to help Takemichi to change the past.
Kazutora Hanemiya (羽宮 一虎, Hanemiya Kazutora)
Voiced by: Shun'ichi Toki (Japanese); Joe Zieja (English)
Portrayed by: Nijiro Murakami (film), Tomoru Akazawa (stage play)
Was one of the Founding members of the Tokyo Manji Gang. However he was sent to juvie as a result of killing Mikey's older brother Shinichiro when he and Baji attempt to steal a motorbike as a present for Mikey's Birthday.
Taiju Shiba (柴 大寿, Shiba Taiju)
Voiced by: Tomokazu Sugita
Is the Leader of 10th Generation of the Black Dragons. He is the older brother of Yuzuha and Hakkai. When their mother died Taiju took upon himself to care for his siblings however the stress caused him physically and emotionally abuse them.
Souya Kawata (河田 ソウヤ, Kawata Sōya)
Voiced by: Kengo Kawanishi
The Vice Captain of the Fourth Division of the Tokyo Manji Gang. He is the younger twin brother of Nahoya Kawata.
Haruchiyo Sanzu (三途 春千夜, Sanzu Haruchiyo)
Voiced by: Nobuhiko Okamoto
The Vice Captain of the Fifth Division of the Tokyo Manji Gang. He has long hair and always wears a mask.
Masataka Kiyomizu (清水 将貴, Kiyomizu Masataka)
Voiced by: Satoshi Hino
Portrayed by: Nobuyuki Suzuki (film), Haruto Sakuraba (stage play)
A member of the Sanbantai of the Tokyo Mankai, a delinquent group. His nickname is "Kiyomasa". He is a member of Shibuya Junior High School and is considered the boss. Before he changed his past, he treated Takemichi as a slave, and was the person who caused Takemichi's life to go haywire.
Atsushi Sendō (千堂 敦, Sendō Atsushi)
Voiced by: Takuma Terashima (Japanese); John Omohundro (English)
Portrayed by: Hayato Isomura (film), Masaki Nakao (stage play)
Was one of Takemichi's friends back in middle school.
Takuya Yamamoto (山本タクヤ, Yamamoto Takuya)
Voiced by: Yūya Hirose (Japanese); Will Choi (English)
A member of the "Mizonaka Goninshu" and Takemichi's childhood friend. He has distinctive long hair and is the quietest and weakest member of the group.
Makoto Suzuki (鈴木マコト, Suzuki Makoto)
Voiced by: Shunsuke Takeuchi
A member of the "Mizonaka Goninshu". He always thinks about his lower body.
Kazushi Yamagishi (山岸一司, Yamagishi Kazushi)
Voiced by: Shouta Hayama (Japanese); Jonathan Leon (English)
A mood maker and a member of the Mizonaka Goninshu. When it comes to delinquents, he has a wealth of information that is worthy of his nickname, "Delinquent Dictionary".

== Moebius ==
Nobutaka Osanai (長内 信高, Osanai Nobutaka)
Voiced by: Eiji Takeuchi (Japanese); Kaiji Tang (English)
Portrayed by: Yoshiki Minato (film), Kenta Nitta (stage play)
Aimi Aishu (Mobius), the eighth president of a delinquent group based in Shinjuku. He enjoys martial arts and has strong arms.

== Tenjiku ==
Izana Kurokawa (黒川 イザナ, Kurokawa Izana)
Voiced by: Nobunaga Shimazaki
The president of the team "Tenjiku" based in Yokohama. He is an adoptive member of Sano family. In the last timeline, where both Mikey and Takemichi time leaped together to prevent "bad endings", Izana reformed "Tenjiku" into a non-profit organization to aid those who are orphans like him and most of his gang members, who also serves as volunteers.
Kanji Mochizuki (望月 莞爾, Mochizuki Kanji)
Voiced by: Tetsu Inada
One of the Four Heavenly Kings of Tenjiku, commonly known as Motchi. He is characterized by his large build and black curly hair. He entered Tokyo with 300 soldiers to crush the Tokyo Mankai.
Kakucho (鶴蝶, Kakuchō)
Voiced by: Seiichiro Yamashita
The first of the Four Heavenly Kings of "Tenjiku" and has the nickname "The Brawler", and also Takemichi's former childhood friend. He has a large scar from his head to his face and is half-blind.
Shion Madarame (斑目 獅音, Madarame Shion)
Voiced by: Koki Uchiyama
One of the Four Heavenly Kings and has a tattoo of a lion on his left temple.
Ran Haitani (灰谷 蘭, Haitani Ran)
Voiced by: Daisuke Namikawa
One of the Four Heavenly Kings of "Tenjiku" and the older brother of the Haitani brothers, who are said to be the charismatic brothers in Roppongi.
Rindo Haitani (灰谷 竜胆, Haitani Rindō)
Voiced by: Hiro Shimono
The younger brother of the Haitani brothers, who are executives of "Tenjiku" and are said to be the charismatic brothers in Roppongi.

== Other characters ==
Hinata Tachibana (橘 日向, Tachibana Hinata)
Voiced by: Azumi Waki (Japanese); Lizzie Freeman (English)
Portrayed by: Mio Imada (film), Kotone Hanase (stage play)
Takemichi's girlfriend back in middle school. She was killed in a conflict that involved the present Tokyo Manji Gang which motivated Takemichi travel back to past to save her from dying.
Naoto Tachibana (橘 直人, Tachibana Naoto)
Voiced by: Ryōta Ōsaka (Japanese); Griffin Puatu (English)
Portrayed by: Yosuke Sugino (film), Jun Noguchi (stage play)
Hinata's younger brother who also died in the conflict caused by the Tokyo Manji Gang in the present timeline. When Takemichi travels back to the past he ends up meeting Naoto where Takemichi told him how he and Hina were going to die in the future and he ends up traveling to the past. When Takemichi and Naoto shake hands, Takemichi returns to the present with an alive Naoto now a Police Officer and convinces Takemichi to go back to the past to save Hina. Since then Naoto has served as Takemichi's trigger to for his time leaping, up until Kisaki's death in 18th timeline. As both Mikey and Takemichi traveled back in 1998 and avert the previous timelines' tragedies for eleven years, Naoto got his dream job at an occult magazine in the last timeline.
Emma Sano (佐野 エマ, Sano Ema)
Voiced by: Yumi Uchiyama (Japanese)Carrie Keranen (English)
Mikey's younger half sister. Before the conflict against Tenjiku she was murdered by Kisaki in order break Mikey and have Izana become the only emotional support for Mikey. Following the 20th time leap, where both Takemichi and Mikey successfully saved Emma and the rest of casualties who died in previous timelines, Emma is now Drakken's house wife, sometime before Takemichi and Hina's marriage.
Shinichiro Sano (佐野 真一郎, Sano Shin'ichirō)
Voiced by: Masaya Matsukaze (Japanese); Billy Kametz (Season 1; English); Alejandro Saab (Season 2; English)
Mikey's late older brother and the leader of the first-generation Black Dragon. He was later revealed to be one of the two previous Time Leapers before Takemichi, hailed from a previous timeline where Mikey passed away in 2003, four years after a childhood accident, with their family friend, Sanzu became his trigger to return to the past and avert Mikey's accident.
Following his successful time travel, despite having discovered what caused Mikey's violent intent uncontrollable, Shinichiro returned in the new 2003 timeline and finally serves his purpose. At the same time, he rescued a young Takemichi, as well as young Hina from three middle school bullies and decided to transfer his Time Leaping power to him, as the means to inspire him to continue hero's path. Although he was unaware that Kisaki was present learning Shinichiro's existence. Shortly after visiting the location where he killed the previous Time Leaper in the previous timeline, Shinichiro suffered a similar karmic death of being inadvertently killed by Kazutora when the latter and Baji attempt to steal a motorbike as a birthday present for Mikey.
Once Mikey and Takemichi are able to return to the past further at the same time, with the former is freed from his violent intent, Shinichiro's death has been averted, allowing Kazutora and Baji to be enlisted to accompany him for Mikey's surprise birthday in a peaceful 2003 timeline. For eleven years since Mikey and Takemichi successfully averted the previous timeline's tragedies, Shinichiro becomes the head of S.S.Motors, which mainly co-sponsors Mikey's motorcycle racing team.
Yuzuha Shiba (柴 柚葉, Shiba Yuzuha)
Voiced by: Mikako Komatsu
Taiju and Hakkai's sister who is a good fighter and protects Hakkai from Taiju's abuse. Following Taiju's redemption in current timelines, Yuzuha becomes Hakkai's manager during their oversea business models in the last 20th timeline.
