= Kenneth Ford =

Kenneth or Ken Ford may refer to:

- Ken Ford (sculptor) (1930–2018), British sculptor
- Ken Ford (American football) (1935–2019), American football player
- Ken Ford (violinist) (born 1968), American jazz violinist
- Kenneth M. Ford (born 1955), American computer scientist
- Kenneth W. Ford (businessman) (1908–1997), American businessman who established Roseburg Forest Products
- Kenneth W. Ford (1926–2025), American physicist, teacher and author
