= Moss H. Kendrix =

Moss Hyles Kendrix
- (source from 'The Crisis' Nov. 1940)
- Born: March 8, 1917; Atlanta, Georgia, U.S.
- Died: January 4, 1989 (aged 71)
- Education: Howard University; Morehouse College
- Occupation: Public relations specialist

Moss Hyles Kendrix (March 8, 1917 – January 4, 1989) was a pioneer in the modern field of public relations. Of his various public relations and advertising campaigns, Kendrix is best known for his Coca-Cola company advertising and for his work to educate major corporate clients and news organizations about the buying power and concerns of African American consumers. In his work for clients including Carnation Milk, the Ford Motor Company, and the Coca-Cola company, he produced advertisements which featured and appealed to African Americans at a time when they were just beginning to find representation in the consumer culture of the Cold War era.

== Biography ==
=== Early life ===
Moss Kendrix was born in Atlanta, Georgia, on March 8, 1917. He spent the majority of his early life near Atlanta University and the west Atlanta neighborhood of Beaver Slide, one of several predominantly African American neighborhoods to take shape after the 1906 Atlanta race massacre. His mother Mary had moved to Atlanta to be near her brother John Russell Hamilton, a businessman and church leader. Hamilton became a surrogate father figure for Kendrix, who graduated from Atlanta University's Laboratory High School in 1935.

=== College ===
Kendrix attended Morehouse College, where he studied history, political science, and economics. He wrote a column for the college newspaper The Maroon Tiger and eventually became its editor in chief. In his writings for the Tiger, Kendrix explored topics including education, the anti-lynching movement, and civil rights, showing an early faith in the power of journalism to create social change. He was a member of Alpha Phi Alpha fraternity and he was co-founder of Delta Phi Delta Journalism Society, the first society of its kind for African American journalism students.

In his role as head of the Delta Phi Delta promotional division, Hendrix founded National Negro Newspaper Week in 1939. He graduated from Morehouse that year having already made extensive connections to leading Black publishers and literary figures like Alain LeRoy Locke, Carl J. Murphy, and George Schuyler, all of whom served on the Delta Phi Delta advisory board. Although Kendrix was admitted into Howard University School of Law in 1939, he opted instead to accept a job directing public relations in the Division of Negro Affairs within Georgia's branch of the National Youth Administration (NYA), where he developed new programs for marketing the New Deal and encouraging youth civic participation. At the same time, he married Dorothy Marie Johnson. They had two sons, Moss Kendrix, Jr. and Alan Kendrix.

=== Career ===
Kendrix continued to work in public relations for the NYA after the entry of the United States into World War II, using articles in Black newspapers like The Chicago Defender and Pittsburgh Courier and radio broadcasts to support the war effort. After the NYA was defunded by Congress in 1943, Kendrix was drafted into the United States Army and stationed at Fort Benning as an assistant public relations officer. Using the many relationships he had built with African American journalists and entertainers during his New Deal work, he organized a successful war bond tour by the fort's African American chorus, which performed with guest appearances by celebrities like Duke Ellington and Billy Eckstine.

The success of the tour landed him a new public relations position at the U.S. Treasury Department in Washington, D.C., which he held briefly until he became a director of public relations for the Centennial Celebration of the Republic of Liberia in 1944 or 1945. In this role, Kendrix pitched Liberia as a lucrative market and trading partner for the United States, while also portraying Black Americans and Africans as loyal partners in the postwar democratic world order. In addition to organizing a successful meeting between U.S. president Harry Truman and Liberian president William Tubman in 1947, Kendrix commissioned the work by Duke Ellington that became the Liberian Suite. Black newspapers praised Kendrix as the "hustling publicist" and "super Public Relations expert" who had masterminded the stateside celebration of Liberia's centennial.

After 1947 Kendrix reinvented himself as an expert in marketing to African Americans and helping companies understand how their products were perceived by Black consumers. In 1948, he founded a public relations firm named The Moss Kendrix Organization, whose first company motto, embossed on the organization's letterhead, was "Court the Negro Market and Count the Results!" It was established in Washington, DC. Kendrix focused on accounts for Carnation, the National Dental Association, the National Education Association, and Ford Motor Company to name a few, combining marketing techniques with advice to clients about brand management. In the process, he educated corporations about how to appeal to African American consumers as a distinctive "Market Within a Market".

An example of a Kendrix advertisement for Coca-Cola featuring African American models

One of his career highlights was the acquisition of The Coca-Cola Company as a client in 1951. By placing advertisements featuring Black models in publications like Ebony (magazine), Kendrix helped the company catch up with competitors like PepsiCo, which had earlier engaged experts like Edward F. Boyd to improve the popularity of Pepsi among African Americans. Kendrix urged the company to hire more Black employees and sale representatives while also helping the company navigate public relations crises. In 1955, for example, he worked behind the scenes to forestall negative publicity for the company when the NAACP threatened to remove Coca-Cola vending machines from its offices due to the segregationist views expressed by a local bottler. Combining marketing with brand management, Kendrix continued to work with Coca-Cola into the 1970s.

=== Death ===
Kendrix died of a heart ailment on January 4, 1989, at his home in Washington. He was married to Muriel Kendrix of Lexington, Massachusetts.

== Literary career ==
The Crisis (Nov. 1940). ' Forums in Georgia '
