= McKinney =

McKinney may refer to:

== People ==
- McKinney (surname)

== Places ==
- McKinney, Texas, a city in Collin County, Texas, United States
- McKinney Acres, Texas, census-designated place in Andrews County, Texas, United States
- McKinney Falls State Park, in Austin, Texas, United States
- McKinney Homestead, in Austin, Texas, United States
- McKinney Roughs Nature Park, in Cedar Creek, Texas, United States

== Other uses ==
- McKinney (advertising agency), a Durham, North Carolina-based advertising agency
- McKinney (horse)

== See also ==
- McKinnie, a surname
- Kinnie (disambiguation)
- Kinney (disambiguation)
