= Kinne =

Kinne may refer to:

== People ==
- Derek Godfrey Kinne (1931–2018), British soldier
- Elam A. Kinne (1832–1913), American politician
- Elizabeth D'Arcy Kinne (1843–1918), American organizational leader
- Frances Kinne (1917–2020), American author, academic administrator, and musician
- G. J. Kinne (born 1988), American football quarterback
- Helen Kinne (1861–1917), American home economist, college professor
- John Baxter Kinne (1877–1954), American soldier
- La Vega G. Kinne (1846–1906), American judge
- Otto Kinne (1923–2015), German biologist
- Ryan Kinne (born 1989), American soccer player
- Sharon Kinne (1939–2022), American murderer
- Thomas J. Kinne (born 1961), German TV game show personality
- W. B. Kinne (1874–1929), American politician
- William H. Kinne (1846–1943), American merchant and politician

== Places ==
- Cape Kinnes, Antarctic geographic feature
- Kinne Cemetery, in Griswold, Connecticut, United States

=== Sweden ===
- Kinne Hundred, a hundred of Västergötland in Sweden
- Kinne Quarter Hundred, a hundred of Västergötland in Sweden
- Kinnevald Hundred, a hundred of Småland in Sweden

== Other uses ==
- Kinne Tonight (Australian TV series)
  - Kinne (Australian TV series)

== See also ==
- Kenney (disambiguation)
- Kenny (disambiguation)
- Kinney (disambiguation)
- Kinnie (disambiguation)
