= Kinney =

Kinney may refer to:

== People ==
- Abbot Kinney, developer and conservationist
- Antoinette Kinney, American politician from Utah
- Asa Kinney, American pioneer and politician
- Bob Kinney, American basketball player
- Chandler Kinney, American actress and dancer
- Charles Kinney, American politician and attorney from Ohio
- Dennis Kinney, baseball player
- Dick Kinney, American animator and comic book writer
- Emily Kinney, American actress and singer
- Erron Kinney, American football player
- Eunice D. Kinney (1851–1942), Canadian-born American physician
- Fern Kinney, American R&B and disco singer
- Garrett D. Kinney, American politician
- Harry E. Kinney, American politician from Albuquerque
- Henry Kinney, American politician
- Jack Kinney, American animator, director and producer
- James Kinney (disambiguation)
- Jay Kinney, American author, editor, and cartoonist
- Jeff Kinney (American football), football player
- Jeff Kinney, author of children's fiction
- John Francis Kinney (1937–2019), American Catholic bishop
- John F. Kinney (1816–1902), American attorney, judge, and politician
- John Kinney (outlaw) (c. 1847–1919), American outlaw
- Joseph Kinney Jr., American politician
- Joseph Robbins Kinney, merchant, notary public and political figure in Nova Scotia, Canada
- Josh Kinney, American baseball player
- Kathy Kinney, actress
- Kelvin Kinney, American football player
- Kevn Kinney, American vocalist and guitarist
- Matt Kinney, American baseball player
- Ole G. Kinney, American politician
- Orson Kinney (1894–1966), American basketball player and coach
- Ray Kinney, singer, musician, composer, orchestra leader
- Ruby Kinney, New Zealand curler
- Sean Kinney, American musician
- Steve Kinney (born 1949), American football player
- Steven Kinney, American soccer player
- Taylor Kinney, American actor and model
- Terry Kinney, American actor and theatre director
- Thomas Kinney, American politician from Missouri and St. Louis organized crime figure
- Troy Kinney, American artist, etcher, and author
- Vince Kinney (born 1956), American football player
- Walt Kinney, American baseball player
- William Kinney (Illinois politician) (1781–1843), American politician
- William Ansel Kinney (1860–c. 1930), American politician
- William Burnet Kinney (1799–1880), American politician

== Fictional characters ==
- Brian Kinney, character from Queer as Folk
- Laura Kinney, Marvel Comics character better known as X-23
- Gabby Kinney, Marvel Comics character, sidekick of X-23

== Places ==
United States

- Kinney, Minnesota
- Kinney County, Texas
- Kenney, Texas, a community also called "Kinney"
- Kinney Run, a stream in Pennsylvania

Canada

- Kinney Lake, in British Columbia

== Other uses ==
- G.R. Kinney Company, shoe manufacturer
- Kinney Drugs
- Kinney National Company, media company that became Warner Communications
- Kinney Parking Company, conglomerate that formed Kinney National Company

== See also ==
- Kenney (disambiguation)
- Kenny (disambiguation)
- Kinne (disambiguation)
- Kinnie (disambiguation)
- McKinney (disambiguation)
- McKinney (surname)
- Clan Mackenzie
- Sleater-Kinney, a punk rock trio
  - Sleater-Kinney (album)
