= Timeline of the COVID-19 pandemic in Texas =

The following is a timeline of the COVID-19 pandemic in Texas.

== Background and evacuee cases ==
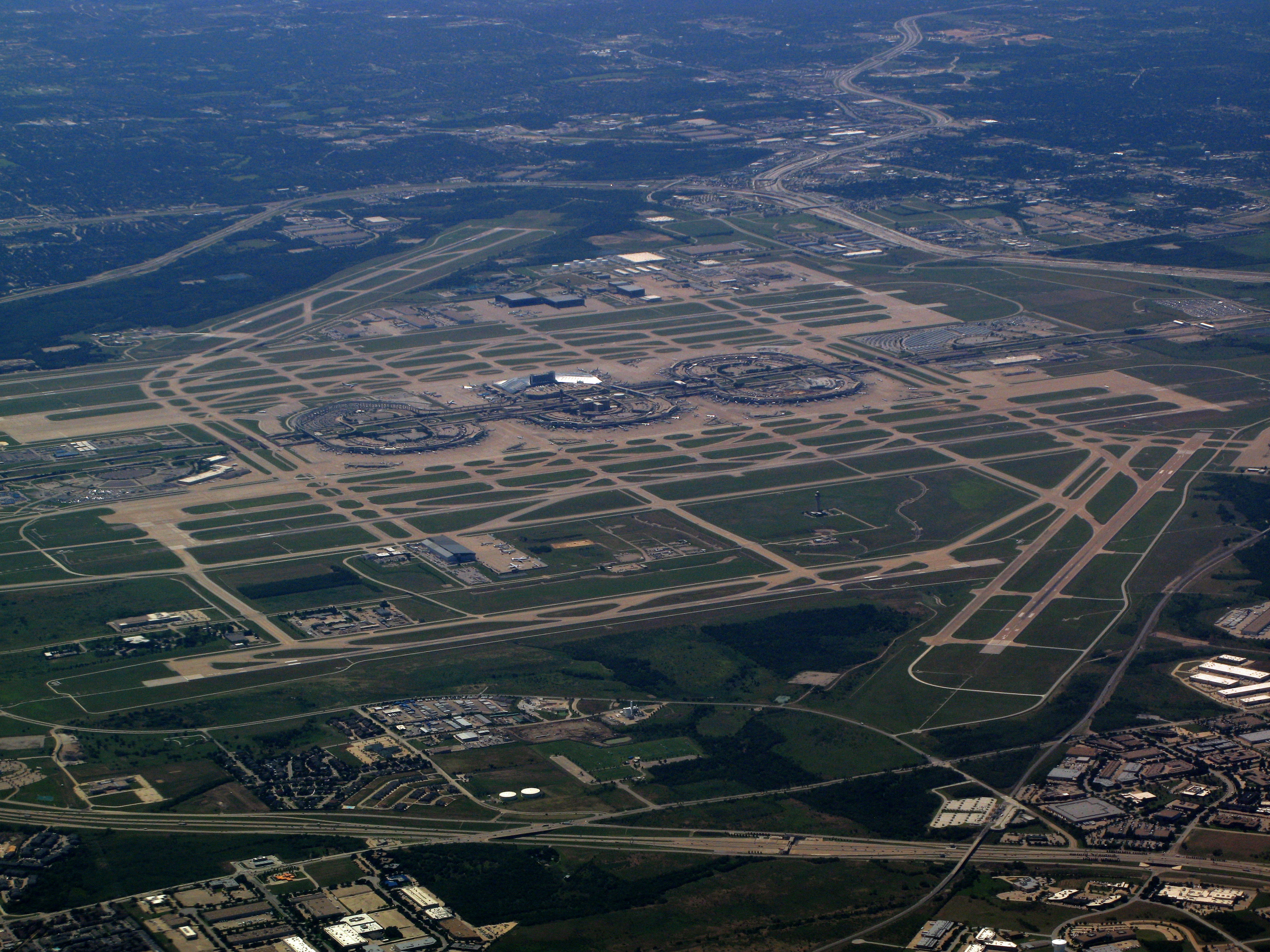
Dallas/Fort Worth International Airport one of eleven airports in the U.S. receiving diverted flights from China after February 3.

A pandemic involving the spread of coronavirus disease 2019 (COVID-19), caused by the severe acute respiratory syndrome coronavirus 2 (SARS-CoV-2), began in 2019 with the outbreak first identified in Wuhan, China, in December 2019. The World Health Organization (WHO) declared the outbreak a Public Health Emergency of International Concern on January 30 and evaluated it as a pandemic on March 11, 2020. The first case in the United States was reported in Snohomish County, Washington, on January 20, and the Trump administration declared a public health emergency on January 31, 2020.

The initial spread of COVID-19 in Texas may have begun prior to the first contemporaneously confirmed case, very likely as early as September 2019 in Houston. In January, February, and March 2020, 1,473 more Texans died compared to the January–March average for 2014–2019. While the Texas Department of State Health Services (DSHS) attributed 41 of these deaths to COVID-19, USA Today reported that doctors believed additional COVID-19 deaths may not have been accounted for due to limited testing early in the pandemic. In one specific case, Bastrop County judge Paul Pape reported symptoms starting February 9. The infection risk of COVID-19 in Texas was initially expected to be low in mid-January, with risks limited to travelers recently returning from China. KWKT-TV in Waco reported that the virus was "no cause of concern in Central Texas" according to local doctors amid the ongoing flu season. On January 23, a student at Texas A&M University was isolated and monitored by the Brazos County Health District after returning from Wuhan, China, and presenting with a respiratory illness; at the time, there was only one known case of COVID-19 in the United States. They were the first person in Texas contemporaneously identified as potentially contracting SARS-CoV-2. Medical supply stores in the Brazos Valley experienced medical mask shortages as demand increased in response to the first suspected case. Over the next four days, Texas health officials identified another three suspected cases of COVID-19 meeting testing criteria, including a student at Baylor University; all four tested negative for the virus after samples were delivered to the Centers for Disease Control and Prevention (CDC) in Atlanta, Georgia, leaving no confirmed cases in Texas.

The Tarrant County Health Department activated its operations center on January 24. Paramedics in the Metroplex increased usage of personal protective equipment (PPE) and adjusted their screening procedures for respiratory illnesses. Hospital protocols were updated to isolate patients presenting to emergency rooms with COVID-19 symptoms and with recent travel to Wuhan. While the CDC did not initially designate Dallas/Fort Worth International Airport to carry out "enhanced screening" of passengers for COVID-19, the airport began coordinating with local hospitals and health departments in late-January. The CDC later implemented COVID-19 screenings at Dallas/Fort Worth International Airport, George Bush Intercontinental Airport in Houston, and El Paso International Airport, with screenings beginning "on a rolling basis" according to Nancy Messonnier of the CDC. These locations were designated as three of twenty CDC Quarantine Stations across the U.S. due to their frequent use as points of arrival for international travelers. The Allied Pilots Association, a labor union representing pilots serving American Airlines, sued American Airlines on January 30 through Dallas County to end all flights to China; the airline acquiesced on February 4. On February 3, the U.S. Department of Homeland Security named Dallas/Fort Worth International Airport as one of 11 airports receiving rerouted flights from China. Health workers from the CDC were dispatched to the airport to screen passengers for COVID-19 symptoms. Screenings were also expanded to border crossings between the U.S. and Mexico at El Paso.

Texas A&M University suspended all undergraduate travel to China on January 28 and allowed only essential travel to China for faculty, staff, and graduate students. Baylor University and the University of Texas also temporarily banned university-sponsored travel to China with the exception of essential travel. Two people in the Dallas area were monitored for possible contraction of COVID-19 on January 31. Another patient was reported as a possible carrier in Beaumont on February 5, and six were being monitored in Austin. Some residents in San Antonio began 14-day self-quarantines. Local health departments, hospitals, and schools in Texas continued to revise their COVID-19 protocols through February. Stocks of N95 masks at clinics in Central Texas were low due to high demand as the pandemic escalated.

=== Evacuee quarantines and cases ===
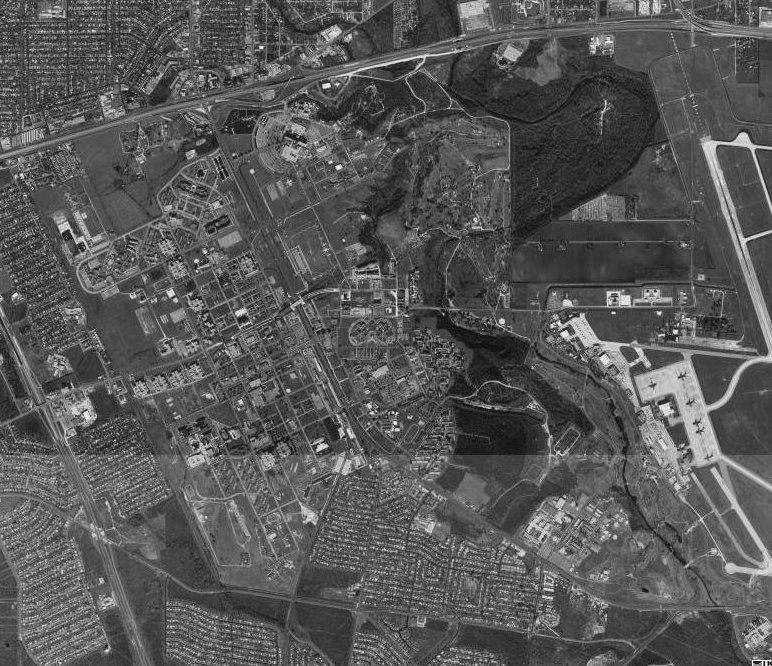
Lackland Air Force Base near San Antonio served as a quarantine center for American nationals evacuated from China and the Diamond Princess cruise ship beginning on February 7.

As part of COVID-19 evacuations of American nationals in China, the Texas Health and Human Services Commission (HHS) and U.S. Department of Defense agreed on February 1 to house at least 250 evacuees for up to a month at Joint Base San Antonio–Lackland (JBSA-Lackland) near San Antonio as one of four reception centers across the country. JBSA–Lackland was chosen due to its large housing capacity, available space, and proximity to medical facilities in San Antonio. The evacuees were flown to U.S. bases on chartered flights operated out by the U.S. Air Force, with the first flight landing in San Antonio on February 5. On February 13, the CDC confirmed one of the individuals quarantined at JBSA-Lackland contracted COVID-19, representing the 15th confirmed case in the U.S. They were among 91 people on a flight arriving at JBSA–Lackland on February 7. After an outbreak of COVID-19 impacted the Diamond Princess cruise ship in February, the U.S. State Department arranged for two charter flights to evacuate U.S. nationals to two U.S. locations, including JBSA–Lackland. Fourteen of the evacuees tested positive for SARS-CoV-2 after being initially asymptomatic, of which seven landed in JBSA–Lackland before being transferred to the University of Nebraska Medical Center in Omaha, Nebraska. On February 21, the CDC announced that another two individuals tested positive for the virus among Diamond Princess evacuees quarantined at JBSA–Lackland, bringing the San Antonio and statewide case total to three. By February 24, the case total in Texas rose to six, all of whom were quarantined at JBSA–Lackland; a total of 11 people at the base were later confirmed as infected, with 9 from the cruise ship and 2 from Wuhan.

Evacuees quarantining at JBSA–Lackland were sent to the Texas Center for Infectious Disease in San Antonio, with 22 beds at the hospital reserved for suspected COVID-19 patients and those presenting with "mild symptoms." By February 19, JBSA–Lackland was supporting the quarantines of 234 people, with 144 from the Diamond Princess cruise ship and 91 from Hubei Province. Nelson Wolff, the Bexar County Judge, criticized the movement of evacuees to hospitals before definitive diagnoses in a letter sent to U.S. Representative Chip Roy. Bexar County Commissioner Tommy Calvert also criticized the decision to move patients out of JBSA–Lackland, stating that the move created "additional vectors for the virus to spread into the civilian population." On February 20, the evacuees from Hubei Province at the base were released after showing no symptoms for 14 days. Despite two earlier negative tests for the virus, one person had a "weakly positive" test after their release from JBSA–Lackland and were moved back to the facility for quarantine on March 1 following 12 hours out of quarantine. Texas Governor Greg Abbott, San Antonio mayor Ron Nirenberg and U.S. Representative Joaquin Castro criticized the CDC's release of the patient; Castro asked the U.S. House of Representatives to investigate CDC patient treatment protocols, with similar requests from U.S. Senators John Cornyn and Ted Cruz and U.S. Representative Lloyd Doggett. The release prompted Nirenberg to declare a public health emergency for San Antonio on March 2. A federal judge denied an injunction filed by the city of San Antonio against the CDC "demanding more rigorous testing" before releasing asymptomatic individuals at JBSA–Lackland. The CDC modified their quarantine protocol in the aftermath of the incident to require "two sequential negative tests within 24 hours" prior to releasing quarantined individuals.

== Timeline ==
=== Early origins ===
The initial origin of community spread in Texas remains unclear, but numerous anecdotal accounts by those later confirmed have included onset dates as early as December 28 in Point Venture, and retrospective analyses have found unexplained statistical increases in deaths during this time. Testing capacity across the state remained extremely limited until after the first recorded cases were announced.

=== March 2020 ===
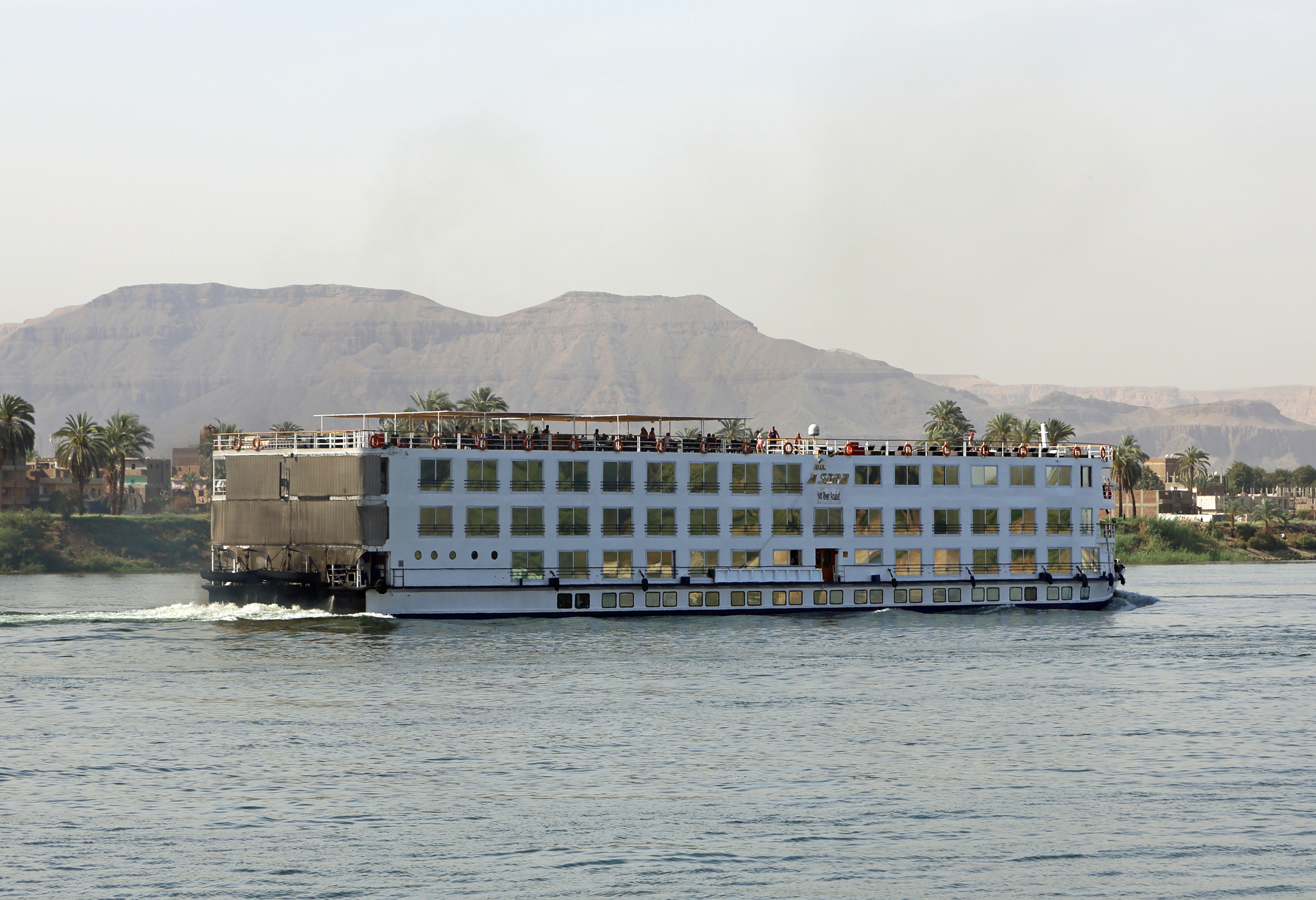
The first confirmed cases in Texas were associated with travelers on board the M.S. A'sara river cruise ship in Egypt

March 2: Research from Austin Public Health found 68 COVID-19 patients in Central Texas began reporting symptoms dating back to this time. San Antonio Mayor Nirenberg issues a public health emergency after an individual positive for the virus is mistakenly released from quarantine at JBSA–Lackland.

March 4: The DSHS reports a presumptive positive test result for COVID-19 from a resident of Fort Bend County in the Houston area. A man in his 70s, he is the first known positive case of the disease in Texas outside of those evacuated from Wuhan and the Diamond Princess cruise ship. The patient had recently traveled to Egypt and was hospitalized. DSHS commissioner John Hellerstedt calls the confirmation a "significant development" but that "the immediate risk to most Texans is low."

March 5: At least eight cumulative cases, including both positive and presumptive positive cases, are identified in the Houston area. The cases involve individuals in the counties of Fort Bend and Harris counties. All individuals with confirmed cases were part of a group that traveled to Egypt in February, including the first confirmed case in Fort Bend County. The travel group rode aboard the Nile River cruise ship MS A'sara. Additional individuals are also investigated as possible carriers in the Houston area in connection with the Egypt trip. The state announces six public health laboratories within its Laboratory Response Network are capable of testing for COVID-19.

March 6: Mayor Steve Adler of Austin declares a local disaster and cancels South by Southwest for the first time in its history.

March 8: JBSA–Lackland receives around 100 evacuees from the cruise ship Grand Princess following a localized outbreak on board. Rice University becomes the first university in the state to enact significant cancellations, suspending in-person classes and undergraduate labs during the week in response to an employee testing positive in connection with the viral cluster that traveled to Egypt.

March 9: The cumulative number of confirmed cases in Texas reported by the DSHS surpasses 10. A resident in his 30s of Frisco in Collin County, a suburb of Dallas, receives a presumptive positive test for the virus after recently traveling to Silicon Valley in California; he is the first case identified in the Dallas–Fort Worth metropolitan area. His wife and 3-year-old child later contracted the disease, with the latter among the youngest confirmed to have the virus in the U.S.

March 10: The first two presumptive positive cases of COVID-19 are reported in Dallas County, composed of a 77-year-old frequent traveler and a close contact. Tarrant County also reports its first presumptive positive case, involving a recent traveler to a conference in Kentucky in late February. Abbott and the Texas Department of Insurance request health insurers and health maintenance organizations (HMOs) to waive COVID-19 diagnosis and treatment costs.

March 11: Local health officials report a positive test for COVID-19 in Montgomery County; they are identified as the first possible case of community spread—not directly related to travel or known contact with positive travelers—in Texas and in the Houston area. The patient's attendance of a barbecue at the Houston Livestock Show and Rodeo on February 28 is reported as a possible but unconfirmed source of the virus. The city of Houston orders the Houston Livestock Show and Rodeo to close after announcing an emergency health declaration. Lakewood Church suspends public services within the church and moves its services online. Montgomery Independent School District in the Houston area and Alvarado Independent School District in the Dallas area become the first two public school districts in Texas to temporarily close classes over COVID-19, affecting approximately 12,400 students across 17 schools.

March 12: After traveling to Barcelona and Paris between March 4–10, a 29-year-old-man becomes the first reported case of COVID-19 in Bell County. Five people test positive for the virus in Dallas County, with one without recent travel history; the individual is the first case of community spread in North Texas, prompting a local disaster declaration for Dallas County.

March 13: San Antonio reports its first positive case of COVID-19 with an individual not associated with the quarantining evacuees at JBSA–Lackland. Mayor Nirenberg declares a public health emergency and limits gatherings of more than 500 people for one week. The first three cases of COVID-19 are also identified in the Austin area. University of Texas President Gregory L. Fenves announces that his wife is among the positive cases following a trip to New York City for a university function with alumni and students. A man in his 40s with recent domestic travel is identified as the first confirmed case of COVID-19 in the El Paso area. Abbott declares a state of disaster for all counties in Texas, invoking emergency powers for his administration, and orders state employees to remote work. Day cares, nursing homes, and prisons are asked to limit visitations. The state's first mobile testing center for COVID-19 opens in San Antonio. Colleges and universities throughout the state extend their spring breaks with some transitioning to online instruction, including Baylor University, the University of Houston, the University of North Texas, the University of Texas at Austin, Texas State University, and Texas Tech University. School districts also announce temporary suspensions of classes statewide.

March 14: Between March 14–19, some students from the University of Texas at Austin take a trip to Cabo San Lucas, Mexico, for spring break; on March 27, a student has a positive test result for SARS-CoV-2 after returning from Cabo San Lucas. A contact tracing investigation conducted by the COVID-19 Center at the University of Texas Health Austin concludes on April 5, with viral tests on 231 students. Among the sample, 60 of the 183 travelers to Cabo San Lucas test positive for the virus. Abbott directs the Texas Medical Board and Texas Board of Nursing to expedite temporary licensing for out-of-state medical professionals while the state remains in a state of disaster.

March 15: Texas Health and Human Services issues guidelines for nursing facilities outlining procedures for COVID-19 screening and restricting personnel and visitors at 1,222 nursing facilities in the state.

March 16: A 40-year-old elementary school teacher is identified as presumptive positive for SARS-CoV-2, becoming the first case of the virus in Laredo. The patient had no history of travel to affected areas. Abbott waives requirements for the State of Texas Assessments of Academic Readiness (STAAR)—standardized tests typically administered in Texas schools. Parts of the Texas Open Meetings Act, which increases transparency for government meetings, are suspended to allow for telephone and video conferences. The mayors of Dallas and Houston order the closure of various social establishments for at least a week; restaurants in Dallas and Harris Counties are limited to drive-through service. San Antonio Mayor Nirenberg reduces the social gathering cap to 50 people.

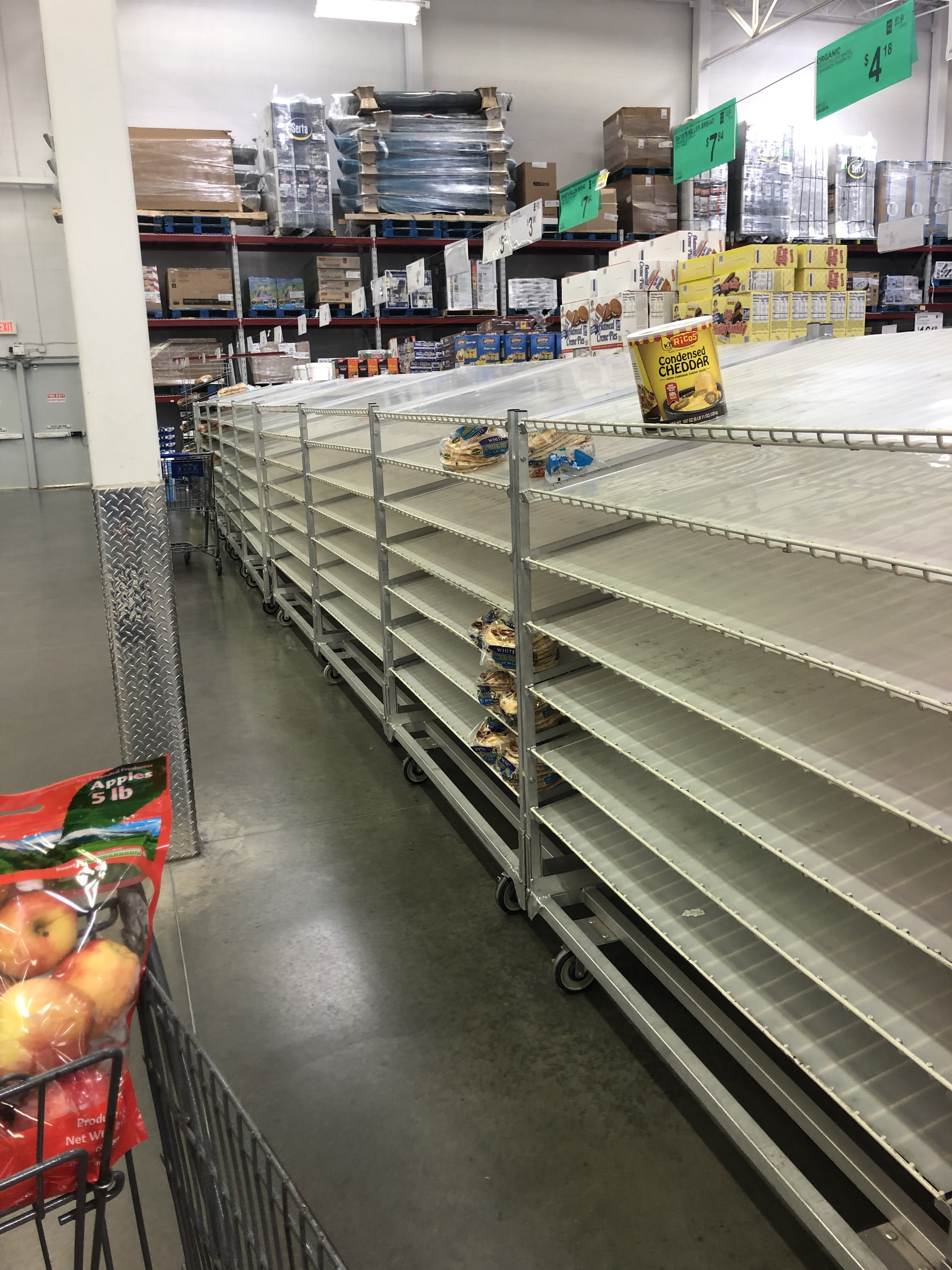
Empty shelves from panic buying at the Sam's Club in Lufkin on March 13, 2020

March 17: DSHS reports that a man in his 90s in Matagorda County died of COVID-19 after being hospitalized, becoming the first official COVID-19 fatality in Texas. Two unrelated travelers are identified as the first two positive confirmations of COVID-19 in Lubbock; neither were hospitalized but self-quarantined at home. The Brazos County Health District confirms the first case of COVID-19, a woman in her 20s, in Brazos County. The Texas National Guard is activated, making Texas the 21st U.S. state to activate their National Guard; the security force is not yet deployed. Abbott grants waivers to hospitals to bolster unused bed capacity without applying or paying added fees. Abbott also asks the Small Business Administration to declare an Economic Injury Disaster Declaration for the state; eligibility is granted three days later. Texas-chartered banks restrict indoor access. Austin and El Paso close their bars, with Austin also closing its restaurants.

March 18: Amarillo and Beaumont confirm their first positive COVID-19 cases, with Amarillo reporting two and Beaumont reporting one. The Waco–McLennan County Health District announces the first six cases in McLennan County; five of the cases are identified as recent travelers. The state closes all Texas Department of Public Safety Driver License Offices, excepting those seeking their first commercial driver's license, as Abbott partially suspends the Texas Transportation Code to delay expiration dates on driver's licenses. Local governments are also authorized to delay elections slated for May 2 to November.

March 19: The cumulative number of confirmed cases in Texas reported by the DSHS surpasses 100. Cameron County reports the first positive case of COVID-19 in the Rio Grande Valley, involving a 21-year-old traveler to Ireland and Spain from mid-March. The first six cases of community transmission in San Antonio are documented. Austin Public Health reports evidence of community spread in Travis County as the county's cumulative case count nearly doubles in a single day. An outbreak begins at the Denton State Supported Living Center in Denton, with the number of positive test results increasing to 55 residents and 67 employees of facility by May 21. The DSHS declares a public health disaster, marking the first such declaration since 1901. DSHS Director Hellerstedt issues the disaster declaration as the disease "has created an immediate threat, poses a high risk of death to a large number of people and creates a substantial risk of public exposure because of the disease's method of transmission and evidence that there is community spread in Texas." Abbott issues four executive orders to ban gatherings of more than 10 people; discourage eating and drinking at bars, food courts, restaurants, and visiting gyms (and close bars and restaurant dining rooms); proscribe visitation of nursing homes, retirement centers, and long-term care facilities with exception of providing critical care; and temporarily close all Texas schools. The Texas Supreme Court halts most eviction proceedings statewide until April 19.

March 20: Abbott postpones runoff elections scheduled for May 26 to July 14. Prisoner healthcare fees related to COVID-19 are suspended. Healthcare providers begin to delay elective medical procedures, including Houston Methodist and the Memorial Hermann Health System.

March 21: Officials in Corpus Christi and Nueces County confirm the first case of COVID-19 in the area. The individual is believed to have contracted the virus following a one-day business trip to Houston. A resident of the Southeast Nursing and Rehabilitation Center in San Antonio is hospitalized and tests positive for COVID-19. An outbreak at the nursing home leads to at least 75 infections and 12 fatalities, prompting investigations by local and state officials. The nursing home had been recently evaluated as having poor sanitation and infection control in federal reports. Abbott suspends nursing regulations to increase the nursing workforce, including nurses with inactive licenses and retired nurses to reactivate their licenses. Dallas County Judge Clay Jenkins proscribes elective medical procedures in the county through April 3.

March 22: Abbott issues an executive order allowing hospitals to treat two patients in the same room and ordering the suspension of "elective or non-essential" medical procedures. Texas Attorney General Ken Paxton clarifies the following day that the order extends to abortions, prompting representatives of abortion providers in Texas to seek a restraining order. Federal Judge Earl Leroy Yeakel III of the Western District of Texas blocks the abortion ban on March 30; the block is overturned by the United States Court of Appeals for the Fifth Circuit on March 31. A Supply Chain Strike Force is formed under the chairmanship of Keith Miears to manage healthcare logistics between public and private sectors.

March 23: The Texas Department of Criminal Justice confirms a positive test result for a 37-year-old prisoner at the Lychner State Jail, marking the first case of COVID-19 from a Texas inmate. The CDC disburses $36.9 million to Texas as part of the Coronavirus Preparedness and Response Supplemental Appropriations Act, 2020 (CARES Act); the DSHS allocates $19.5 million to 43 local health departments and the remainder to operations support and state response. Abbott asks President Trump to issue a disaster declaration for the state of Texas with crisis counseling and direct federal assistance for all counties. A "shelter-at-home order" goes into effect for Dallas County.

March 24: The cumulative number of confirmed cases in Texas reported by the DSHS surpasses 500 and the cumulative number of confirmed COVID-19 fatalities reported by the DSHS surpasses 10. Abbott issues an executive order requiring hospitals to report bed capacity to the state health department daily and healthcare providers to report COVID-19 testing. The Supply Chain Strike Force orders $80 million in supplies, including 200,000 masks daily. Stay-at-home orders go into effect in Bexar, Harris, and Travis counties.

March 25: President Trump approves a federal disaster declaration for the state of Texas. The declaration obligates $628.8 million in public assistance grants from the Federal Emergency Management Agency (FEMA).

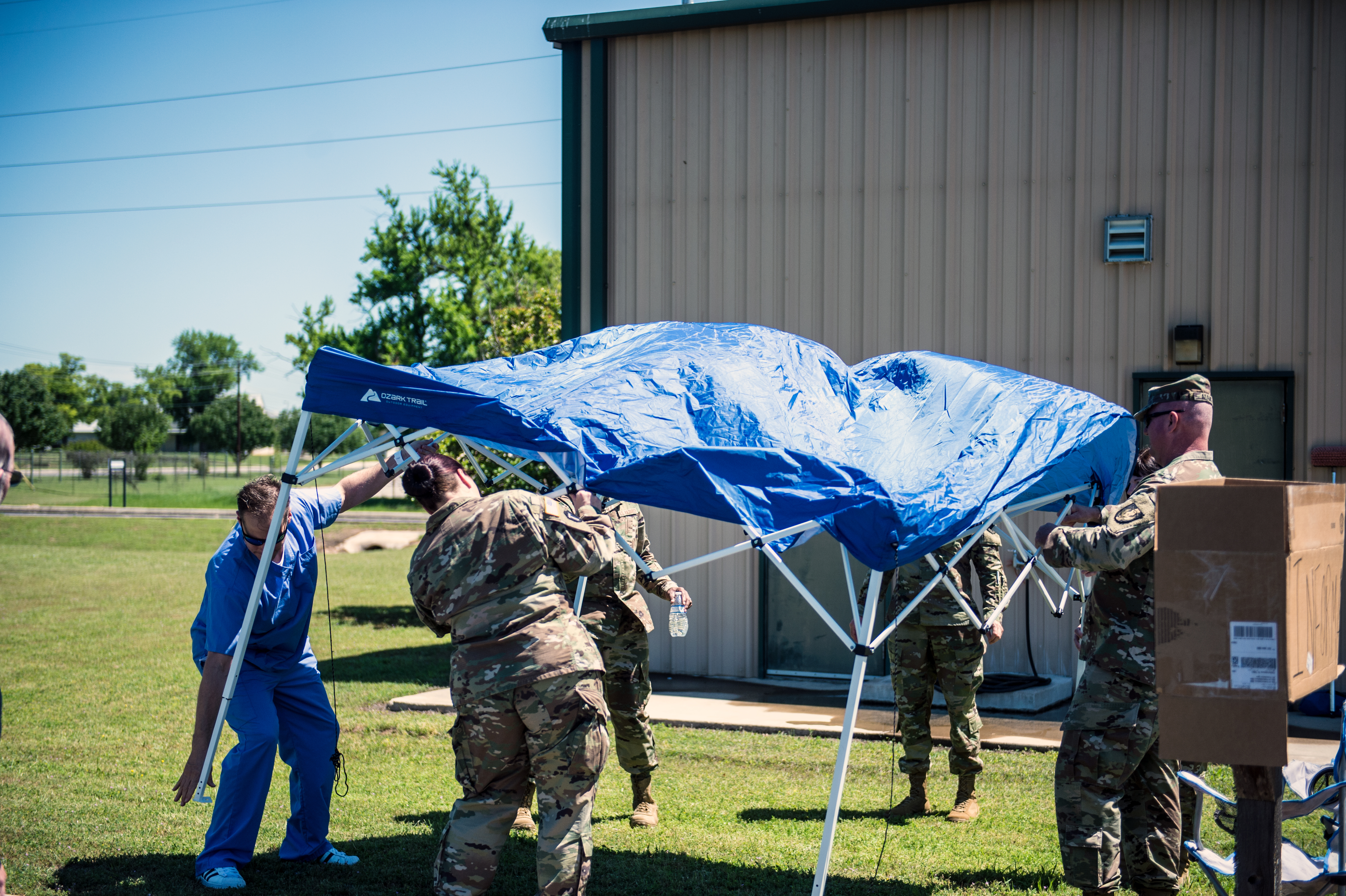
The Texas National Guard was deployed on March 27 to aid mobile COVID-19 testing

March 26: The cumulative number of confirmed cases in Texas reported by the DSHS surpasses 1,000. An executive order issued by Abbott mandates visitors flying to Texas from Connecticut, New Jersey, New York, and New Orleans, Louisiana, to self-quarantine for 14 days. Modelling from a team of researchers at the University of Texas at Austin was presented to the government of Austin. The model projected epidemiological outcomes of school closures and varying degrees of social distancing compliance out to August 17, starting with a basic reproduction number of 2.2, an average incubation period of 7.1 days, a doubling time of 4 days, and the initial prevalence of COVID-19 in the region. It indicated that healthcare capacity of the Greater Austin metropolitan area would be exceeded if "extensive social distancing measures" were not implemented. The simulation estimated 87,501 cumulative hospitalizations and 10,908 cumulative deaths in the absence of social distancing measures or school closures, compared to 3,254 cumulative hospitalizations and 267 cumulative deaths with both school closures and 90 percent social distance compliance; of the four social distancing scenarios modeled, only the 90 percent compliance scenario indicated hospitalizations within capacity through August 17.

March 27: Three brigades from the Texas National Guard are deployed to assist drive-through COVID-19 testing sites. The U.S. government authorizes the Texas Health and Human Services Commission to extend coverage for the Supplemental Nutrition Assistance Program (SNAP) and Medicaid.

March 28: The number of confirmed cases in Houston triples from 69 to 232. A first case of COVID-19 is reported at The Resort, a nursing home in Texas City. By April 3, 83 people at The Resort test positive for the virus. Renewal regulations for pharmacists, pharmacy technicians, and pharmacy technician trainees are waived to bolster pharmaceutical services.

March 29: The state's mandatory 14-day quarantines are expanded to include air travelers entering Texas from the states of California and Washington, the cities of Atlanta, Detroit, and Miami, and road travelers entering Texas from Louisiana. The Kay Bailey Hutchison Convention Center in Dallas, with capacity for at least 250 beds, is designated as Texas's first ad hoc treatment facility COVID-19. Initial modelling from the Institute for Health Metrics and Evaluation (IMHE) at the University of Washington projects 6,029 deaths in the state by August 4 with peak hospital resource use and daily fatalities on May 5–6.

March 31: An executive order from Abbott amends earlier social distancing policies, limiting activities susceptible to the spread of COVID-19 and giving police power to apprehend violators effective through April 30; the order does not apply to activities classified as essential. Schools are ordered closed to classroom attendance until May 4. Across the state, 51 counties are under stay-at-home orders by the end of March 2020.

=== April 2020 ===
April 1: Thirteen counties report COVID-19 cases for the first time. The Texas Department of Public Safety (DPS) begins rolling out enforcement of travel restrictions ordered by Abbott, sending troopers to airports to direct travelers to quarantines. El Paso expands restrictions on most gatherings of any size and closes recreational areas.

April 2: Eight counties confirm cases of COVID-19 for the first time. Data from the DSHS indicates COVID-19 fatalities in the state quadrupled over the preceding week.

April 3: Two counties report COVID-19 cases for the first time. Harris County becomes the first county to document over 1,000 total cases, with the Houston area accounting for 38 percent of cases in the state.

April 4: The cumulative number of confirmed COVID-19 fatalities in Texas reported by the DSHS surpasses 100. Six counties report cases for the first time.

States, territories, and counties in the U.S. that issued a stay-at-home order: Came into effect before March 22 Came into effect before March 29 Came into effect before April 5 Came into effect before April 12

April 5: Analysis from the University of Texas estimate a 9 percent likelihood of undetected outbreaks occurring in counties without reported cases. Abbott permits new medical professionals to enter the workforce with an emergency license under supervision without taking a final licensure exam. The Texas DPS establishes checkpoints along the state border with Louisiana on Interstate 10 following the mandatory quarantine order for road travelers entering from Louisiana.

April 6: Six counties report COVID-19 cases for the first time. Abbott reports that 1.68 million masks and 210,000 face shields have been distributed in the state since March 30, with another 2.5 million masks awaiting distribution and 3 million masks pending delivery. Harris County begins constructing a medical shelter at NRG Park to handle an influx of COVID-19 patients, with approval later given for a $60 million backup field hospital.

April 7: Four counties report COVID-19 cases for the first time. All Texas state parks operated by Texas Parks and Wildlife and historical sites operated by the Texas Historical Commission close to prevent the spread of COVID-19. The Texas Department of Criminal Justice enlists inmates at 10 prison factories to produce up to 20,000 cloth masks daily. Texas Lieutenant Governor Dan Patrick forms a task force for reopening businesses.

April 8: The DSHS reports over 1,000 cases in a single day for the first time, with 1,092 on April 10. Four counties report COVID-19 cases for the first time. The U.S. Department of Agriculture authorizes Texas Health and Human Services to grant SNAP recipients the maximum allowable allotment from the program based on family size, amounting to over $168 million in emergency benefits.

April 9: The cumulative number of confirmed cases in Texas reported by the DSHS surpasses 10,000. Three counties report COVID-19 cases for the first time. The Texas Health and Human Services Commission reports that COVID-19 cases have been confirmed at approximately 13 percent of the 1,222 nursing homes in the state. The Dallas City Council approves $4.3 million to use recreational vehicles and hotel rooms to quarantine first responders.

April 10: The DSHS reports 1,441 new cases, representing the highest single-day increase until mid-May. Six counties report COVID-19 cases for the first time. The Austin City Council allocates $15 million from city reserves to provide monetary assistance and food service through Austin Public Health.

April 11: Abbott extends the state's disaster declaration, issued on March 13, for an additional 30 days. The declaration prolongs operation of the State Operations Center and access to the Strategic National Stockpile.

April 13: Abbott announces his intention to reopen private businesses in the state. The city of Houston relaxes testing requirements for COVID-19, allowing anyone to get tested regardless of symptoms.

April 14: Three counties report COVID-19 cases for the first time. Texas airports receive $811.5 million in support from the CARES Act.

April 15: Three counties report COVID-19 cases for the first time. Abbott announces that the Texas Public Safety Office will allocate $38 million in federal funding to local governments.

April 16: Seven counties report COVID-19 cases for the first time. Dallas County and San Antonio begin mandating face masks. The Texas Frontline Child Task Force apportions $200 million in funding to support child care costs for essential workers.

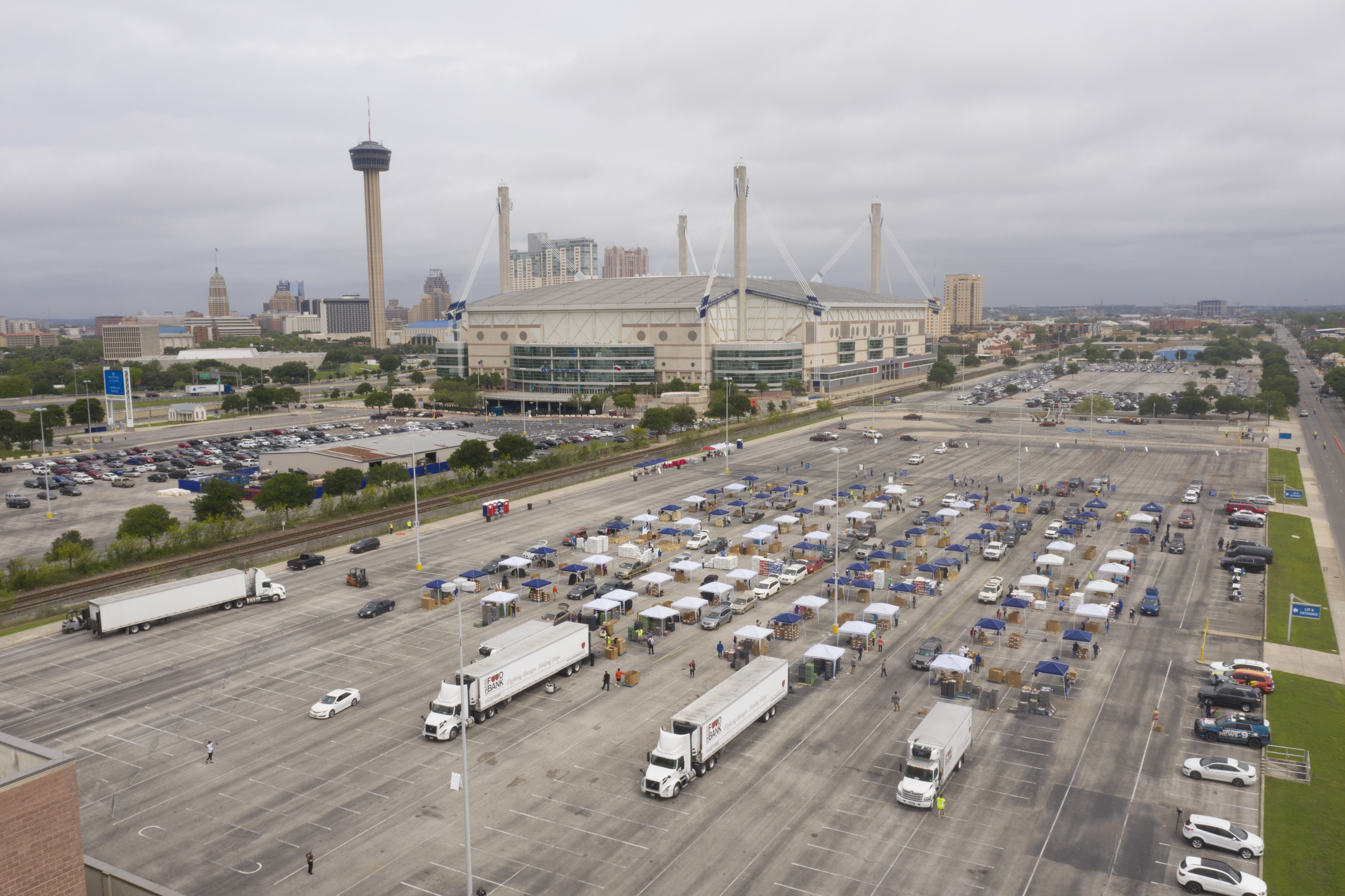
Mass distribution sites for food were established in Texas, including one at the Alamodome

April 17: A privately homeless shelter in Dallas reports the first 17 of ultimately 38 positive results for COVID-19. Abbott announces the start of his plan to reopen the Texas economy, citing a "semi-flattened curve" of COVID-19 cases in the state. The reopening is outlined in three executive orders issued by Abbott that allows for state parks to open under social distancing regulations on April 20, limited nonessential surgeries at hospitals beginning after April 21, and product pickup at retail stores beginning on April 24. The reopening process also establishes the Strike Force to Open Texas, an advisory panel to Abbott for reopening economy. The panel is led by James Huffines with Mike Toomey as its chief operating officer; its consulting members are all members of the Republican Party. The panel also consists of a medical team and a special advisory council. Abbott also calls for public schools to remain closed for the rest of the 2019–2020 academic year.

April 18: Three counties report COVID-19 cases for the first time.

April 20: Immigration and Customs Enforcement (ICE) reports 24 detainees have COVID-19 at the Prairieland Detention Center in Alvarado. Over 1,200 personnel on 25 COVID-19 mobile testing teams from the Texas National Guard are deployed around the state at locations determined by the DSHS.

April 22: Two counties report COVID-19 cases for the first time. Harris County begins mandating the use of face coverings for 30 days, enforceable by a $1,000 fine.

April 23: The Texas Health and Human Services Commission receives $54 million through the CARES ACT to provide COVID-19 support for disability and geriatric services.

April 24: Two counties report COVID-19 cases for the first time.

April 27: Pursuant to the executive order establishing the Strike Force to Open Texas, Abbott releases the Texas Governor's Report to Open Texas, putting forth a phased approach to reopen the state's economy, outlining a three-phase plan to reopen and relax restrictions on Texas businesses in addition to providing guidance on newly released social protocols from the governor and chief officers of the Strike Force to Open Texas. Abbott also outlines three phases for expanding contract tracing. The limits and timetable specified in the state reopening plan overrule local jurisdictions. Baylor University President Linda Livingstone announces the university's intention to provide in-person instruction and student residency in fall 2020.

April 28: Two counties report COVID-19 cases for the first time.

April 30: Two counties report COVID-19 cases for the first time. Stay at-home order ends in the entire state of Texas.

=== May 2020 ===
May 2: Amarillo Mayor Ginger Nelson announces that a federal team will be deployed in the city to quell quickly rising infection rates in the region. The CDC assumes control of investigations and testing in the Amarillo area at Nelson's behest.

May 5: Abbott modifies his earlier reopening timetable, allowing barbershops, hairdressers, and nail salons to begin reopening on May 8 while maintaining social distancing. Gyms and exercise facilities are allowed to reopen beginning May 18 while operating at quarter occupancy. "Hybrid" graduation ceremonies are also permitted by the state while following social distancing guidelines. The governor also announces the implementation of "Surge Response Teams" for outbreaks arising during reopening. The Texas Office of Court Administration provides guidance allowing courts to begin in-person non-jury proceedings on and after June 1.

May 6: The state, in cooperation with the OneStar Foundation, initiates the Texas COVID Relief Fund as a mechanism for granting local organizations funds. A $15 million relief fund is approved by the Houston City Council to assist renters with overdue payments following wage losses.

May 8: The cumulative number of confirmed COVID-19 fatalities in Texas reported by the DSHS surpasses 1,000. Stay-at-home orders in Austin are extended to the end of May.

May 11: Following federal recommendations to test nursing home residents, Abbott mandates COVID-19 testing for all nursing home residents and personnel, covering approximately 230,000 people. Local fire departments join the nursing home testing efforts four days later following a collaboration between several state agencies. San Antonio extends free COVID-19 testing to asymptomatic individuals.

May 12: Abbott extends the ongoing disaster declaration for the state for a second time following its initial issuance on March 13. The Texas Health and Human Services Commission (HHSC) is authorized by the USDA to provide $285 per child for families without access to free or discounted school meals due to COVID-19, amounting to over $1 billion for the state in food benefits. Texas Attorney General Ken Paxton pens letters to Bexar, Dallas, and Travis counties and the mayors of Austin and San Antonio calling their actions "strict and unconstitutional" warning them not to implement restrictions more stringent than the state.

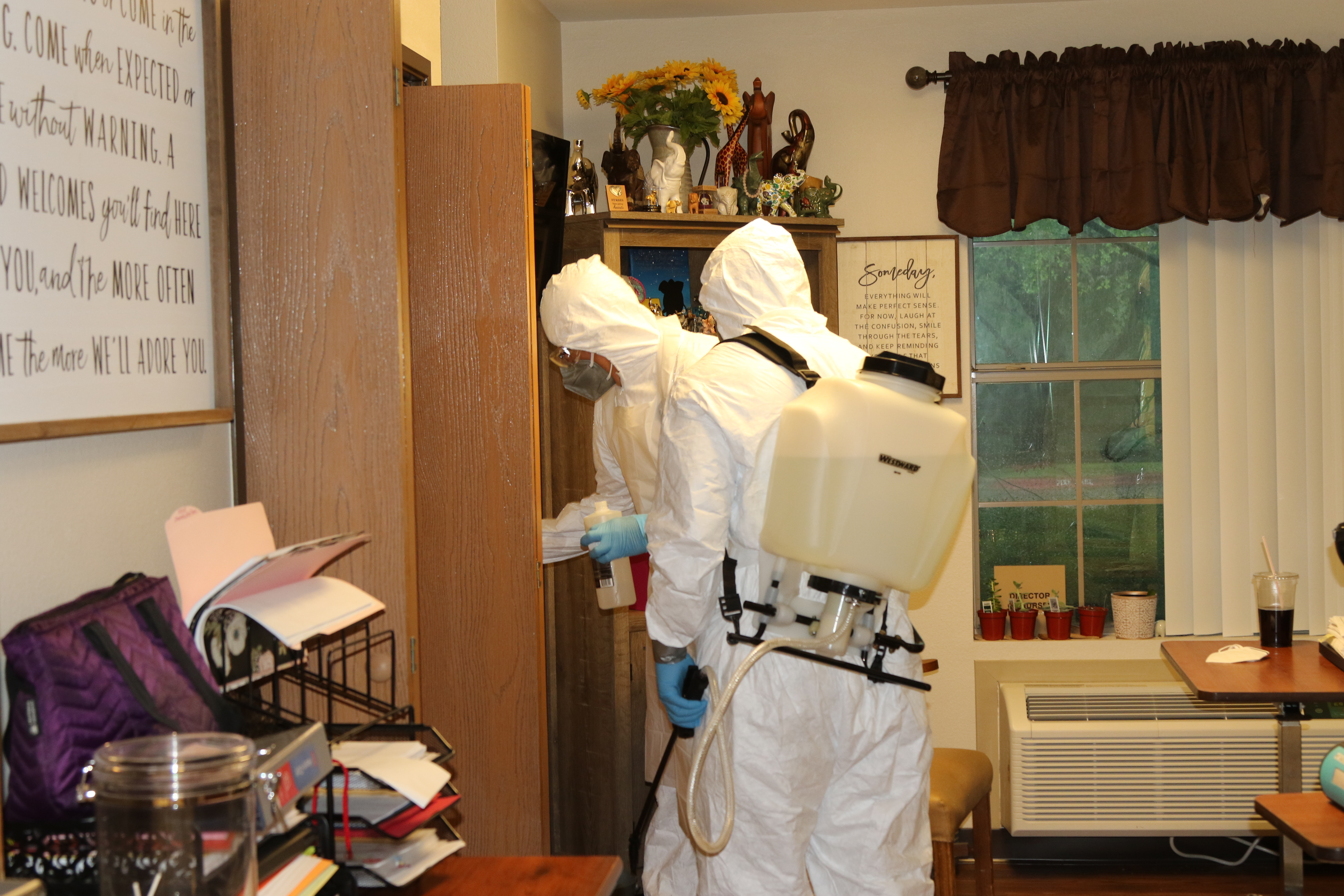
Soldiers from the Texas Army National Guard were dispatched to disinfect nursing homes statewide on May 13

May 13: Members of the Texas National Guard are deployed to disinfect nursing homes and assisted living facilities, which at the time have accounted for 47 percent of the state's deaths.

May 16: The DSHS reports 734 new cases of COVID-19 in the Amarillo area following targeted testing of meatpacking facilities in the region carried out by a surge response team beginning on May 4. The influx of cases contributes to the largest single-day increase in COVID-19 cases in the state, with 1,801 new cases. These findings lead to the shutdown of plants with outbreaks with positive-testing individuals isolated at nearby hotels.

May 18: Texas enters Phase 2 of the governor's reopening plan, allowing more businesses to open or increase their active capacity. The reopening phase also allows some businesses to open promptly; these businesses include child care centers, gyms and exercise facilities, manufacturers, massage establishments, office buildings, and youth clubs. Restaurants are allowed to begin operating at 50 percent capacity on May 29. Other businesses and activities are also given staggered reopening dates under the reopening plan out to June 15. Abbott delays the reopening timetables in Deaf Smith, El Paso, Moore, Potter, and Randall counties by one week.

May 21: Texas Supreme Court Justice Debra Lehrmann tests positive for COVID-19, becoming the highest-ranking official with a reported positive test. All active air travel restrictions for travelers arriving in Texas are lifted by Abbott, ending the mandatory 14-day self-quarantine requirement. Abbott also announces a phased opening of driver license offices beginning in early June following their closure in March. The HHSC expands COVID-19 testing to all patients and personnel at its 23 psychiatric hospitals and living centers; at that point, there were 161 positive cases at those facilities with at least one case at seven facilities. CVS Pharmacy introduces COVID-19 testing at 44 locations in the state.

May 22: Abbott issues an executive order to prohibit in-person visitation at all county and municipal jails in the state with the exception of meetings with attorneys or clergy.

May 31: The DSHS reports 1,949 new cases of COVID-19, marking the highest daily total for May and setting a new record for highest daily case total since the beginning of the pandemic in Texas.

=== June 2020 ===
June 3: Texas enters Phase 3 of Abbott's reopening plan, allowing most businesses to increase maximum occupancy to 50 percent. Restaurants are permitted to operate at 75 percent capacity beginning June 21 while outdoor college sports are allowed to resume immediately for the first time.

June 8: The DSHS reports 1,935 active COVID-19 hospitalizations, marking the highest number since May 5. TDEM begins to increase COVID-19 testing sites in minority communities disproportionately affected by the pandemic in Abilene, El Paso, Houston, Laredo, San Antonio, the Midland-Odessa metropolitan area, the Rio Grande Valley, and the Texas Coastal Bend. Testing is also increased in cities with large protests following the murder of George Floyd.

June 9: COVID-19 hospitalizations in the state reach record-highs for the second consecutive day, with 2,153 in total hospitalized on June 9 representing a 42 percent increase in hospitalizations since Memorial Day. The DSHS attributes the increase in part to outbreaks at state prisons and meatpacking plants.

June 16: The mayors of Arlington, Austin, Dallas, El Paso, Grand Prairie, Fort Worth, Plano, Houston, and San Antonio petition Abbott to allow local officials to mandate masks, stating that "a one-size-fits-all approach is not the best health policy" in a letter to Abbott. Increasing hospitalizations prompt the city of Austin and Travis County to prolong stay-at-home orders by a month.

June 19: The cumulative number of confirmed cases in Texas reported by the DSHS surpasses 100,000. A new record for COVID-19 hospitalizations, with 2,947 people, is set for the seventh consecutive day.

June 23: The state reports more than 5,000 new cases of COVID-19 in a single day for the first time, documenting 5,489. Hospitalizations related to COVID-19 also reach a record high with 4,092. Abbott gives approval for mayors and county judges to enact restrictions on outdoor gatherings with more than 100 people, reducing the size limit from 500. Abbott also indicates that respirator enforcement is within the purview of local officials. Abbott orders the HHSC to reinstate COVID-19 health and safety standards at child care centers, reversing the agency's lifting of those requirements on June 12.

June 24: The seven-day average positivity rate—the ratio of positive cases of COVID-19 to tests conducted—rises above 10 percent, reaching levels unseen since mid-April and reaching a threshold Abbott referred to as a "red flag" in early May. Connecticut, New Jersey, and New York announce a "joint travel advisory" mandating quarantines for travelers arriving from Texas and seven other states. The TDEM and Texas Military Department begins distributing 3-ply masks freely to people testing at state-run mobile testing sites.

June 25: A record-high number of new COVID-19 cases, 5,996, is set for the third consecutive day in Texas; the three days contribute over 17,000 cases to the cumulative case count. The Texas Medical Center, the largest medical center in the world, reports 100 percent occupancy of its standard intensive care unit capacity, forcing the center to begin utilizing auxiliary "surge capacity". Abbott pauses the reopening of the businesses in the state as hospitalizations deaths and new COVID-19 cases begin to quickly rise, though prior relaxations of COVID-19 restrictions remain in place. Elective medical procedures are banned by the governor in Bexar, Dallas, Harris, and Travis Counties to reduce pressure on hospital capacity.

June 26: Abbott begins rolling back some of the lifted restrictions from his earlier state reopening plan, issuing an executive order that promptly closes bars except for takeout and curbside pickup and closes rafting and tubing businesses in addition to restricting indoor dining at restaurants to 50 percent capacity. The order also requires most outdoor gatherings with at least 100 people to seek approval by local governments. Harris County Judge Lina Hidalgo evaluates the county as having reached the highest threat level, indicating a "severe and uncontrolled level of COVID-19", and calls for the reinstatement of a stay-at-home order for the county in addition to prohibiting outdoor gatherings with more than 100 people in unincorporated parts of the county. Tarrant County begins mandating face masks at all businesses.

June 27: Austin Mayor Adler reports that the Greater Austin metropolitan area has the highest positivity rate for COVID-19 tests of any metropolitan area in the U.S. over the preceding week. San Antonio sends an emergency alert urging residents in San Antonio and Bexar County to stay home after the city reports a record 795 new cases of COVID-19.

June 29: Texas Medical Center (TMC) hospitals revised their calculation of ICU bed capacity, including other TMC hospital beds that can be converted into ICU beds and reassigning staff and equipment. This reduced TMC's total ICU usage on Sunday from 93% to 72%. TMC provided an overview of their current ICU bed usage and capacity.

June 30: The DSHS reports 6,975 new cases of COVID-19, marking the highest daily total for June and setting a new record for the highest daily case total since the beginning of the pandemic in Texas. Abbott extends bans on elective medical procedures to Cameron, Hidalgo, Nueces, and Webb counties. The Harris County Commission votes to extend the county's COVID-19 disaster declaration, which includes mandatory mask usage, to August 26.

=== July 2020 ===
July 1: The DSHS records record-high cases and hospitalizations for the second consecutive day. The new cases are predominantly among younger cohorts and outbreaks at child care facilities. Austin City Limits Music Festival, one of the largest annual music festivals in the U.S., is canceled.

July 2: Abbott mandates the wearing of face coverings in public spaces through an executive order, stating that it is "one of the most effective ways we have to slow the spread of COVID-19." The order also stipulates a written and oral warning for first-time violations of the mask mandate and fines of up to $250 for each subsequent violation. Counties with 20 or fewer active cases of COVID-19 are allowed to opt-out of the order. Children younger than 10 years old, people with an interfering medical condition are exempted from the order, as well as people attending church, voting at polling places, or exercising outdoors. Austin Mayor Adler issues an executive order, restricting gatherings with more than 10 people outside of child-care services, religious gatherings, and recreational sports.

July 4: The state sets a record for new COVID-19 cases in a single day, with 8,258, and a record for active COVID-19 hospitalizations, with 7,890; the latter represents the sixth consecutive day of increasing hospitalizations statewide. Parks and beaches throughout the state remain closed for the Independence Day weekend.

July 6: Fifty staff and parishioners at the Calvary Chapel in Universal City tested positive for COVID-19 after weeks of holding services while following "the letter of the law" about reopening. Pastor Ron Arbaugh, who tested positive along with his wife, took responsibility for allowing parishioners to hug inside the church.

July 7: Over 10,000 new cases of COVID-19 are confirmed for the first time, surpassing the previous record set on July 4. The day ends with a record-high number of hospitalizations for the tenth-straight day, with 9,268 COVID-19 hospitalizations. The DSHS also reports the largest single-day increase in COVID-19 fatalities with 60, breaking a record set on May 14. The State Fair of Texas, typically scheduled for the fall, is canceled for the first time since World War II.

July 9: Number of recorded daily fatalities rises above 100 for the first time.

July 13: Number of new case continues to rise rapidly. The severity is expected to maintain in the Central, South and West counties while cooling off in the North. Averaged new case per day in Dallas expects to rise an extra 116 in two weeks after July 13.

July 15: Texas set a record for new cases statewide reaching 10,975 new cases on July 15; this contributed to 289,837 total cases in Texas, including 105 deaths, with numbers in the nation's fourth largest city, Houston, reaching 32,695, including 304 deaths. While being the "largest concentration" of people in Texas, Houston and Harris county in total are keeping an average number of infection and fatalities per capita.

July 17: 14,916 new infection cases and 174 covid-related fatalities are added. Total number of recorded infection cases has grown above 300,000. Accumulation of cases from 200,000 to 300,000 cases took 10 days. Previous 100,000 added cases took place over 17 days. 85 infants under the age of one year old test positive in Nueces County. During the previous week, 328 people tested positive for COVID-19 out of 860 tests in Nueces County, a 38% positivity rate.

July 19: Governor Abbott announces that five United States Navy teams would be deployed to hospitals in Harlingen, Del Rio, Eagle Pass, and Rio Grande City. In the Rio Grande Valley, ambulance operators attempting to deliver patients to emergency rooms reported waiting up to ten hours.

July 20: Texas comptroller predicts $4.6 billion budget shortfall due to coronavirus.

July 22: A new highest fatalities per day, with 197 deaths reported; The Department of State Health Services also reported 9,879 new cases in Texas.

July 23: Starr County Memorial Hospital, the only hospital in a county of roughly 64,700 people, formed an ethics committee and triage committee to determine which sick patients would be treated locally, which would be transferred to other hospitals, and which would be sent home to die.

July 24: Data including numbers culled from Texas Department of State Health Services by The Texas Tribune marked 10,036 hospitalized with confirmed COVID-19 diagnoses and 369,826 reported cases in 250 counties.

July 27: On this date, DSHS announced that due to a recent change in their reporting system an "automation error" caused 225 deaths in Texas this week to be incorrectly reported as COVID-19 deaths. DSHS corrected this error, reducing the official death toll on July 27 from 675 to 451, on July 28 from 164 to 161, and on July 29 from 313 to 302. The correctly reported 451 deaths on July 27 was nonetheless the largest single day COVID-19 death toll in Texas to date.

July 29: The total number of COVID-19 deaths in Texas surpassed 6,000 and the total number of detected infections exceeded 400,000 cases. Congressional Representative Louie Gohmert (R) from Texas, who is opposed to wearing masks, became infected.

=== August 2020 ===
August 3: No deaths were reported by the Texas DSHS, the state agency is increasing lapsing and reporting delays

August 11: Texas became the third state in the U.S. after California and Florida to exceed 500,000 in total number of reported cases. On a per capita basis Texas ranks 12th among US states, with Louisiana, Florida, Arizona, Mississippi and Georgia leading the list.

August 12: DSHS reports 322 COVID-19 deaths, August's highest daily death toll.

August 14: The Houston Texans announce that there would be no fans at NRG Stadium during their home opener on September 20.

August 17: DSHS reported COVID-19 deaths in Texas now exceed 10,000, doubling in just 23 days.

August 27: DSHS reported COVID-19 deaths in Texas now exceed 12,000.

=== September 2020 ===
September 1: During August, 5,844 COVID-assigned death cases were added by Texas DSFS (this is 55% more than in California and twice more per capita; and 35 times more than in New York, which was heavily hit in the beginning), as compared to 4,356 for July. The total death toll before July was 2,481.

September 23: By September 23, college towns in Texas have become new hot spots. Cases rose among students as university administrators struggled with how to keep infections from spreading beyond the university. The spread is believed to be driven by off-campus parties. Texas Tech parties have been posted to social media and are under investigation by university officials. The school has reported over 1,400 COVID cases. Other metrics like daily hospitalizations have been decreasing but some counties report a "mild uptick" since students have returned to campus.

=== October 2020 ===
October 29: Larger hospitals in Lubbock, Amarillo and El Paso did not have space available to accept transfers of seriously ill Covid patients from rural areas.

=== November 2020 ===
November 10: El Paso had 1,076 hospitalized cases, which occupied half of all patient beds in the city. University Medical Center set up tents in a parking lot to care for patients, and a downtown convention center became a field hospital. Other locations in Texas sent 1,400 health care workers to El Paso, and 60 health care workers in three teams from the Defense Department had arrived. Six more mobile morgues were added, for a total of ten. A two-week partial lockdown order, set to expire on the 11th, had been met with mayoral opposition and inconsistent enforcement, and had not reduced hospitalizations.

November 21: According to Texas Department of State Health Services the number of new infections began to exceed 12,000 per day. Fatalities have also increased. In spite of common-sense expectations, infection and death rates are already substantially higher in rural counties, and the difference with main metro areas is increasing. For instance, counties Hale, Lamb and Hockey (north and west of Lubbock) recorded together 164 fatalities, which is very close to 163 in Williamson (north part of Austin metro). However, the population in Williamson county is about 590,000, which is much higher than the roughly 72,000 population for those three counties combined (Hale, Lamb, Hockey).

November 25: The number of daily-added new infections for the first time became higher than 15 thousand, after exceeding 14 thousand just yesterday, on November 24.

November 26: Returning to the shown for November 21 comparison between rural and metro areas: according to Texas DSHS in 5 days between November 21 and 26 the mentioned three counties added 18 death cases, while Williamson county added only 2, and this calculates as roughly 50-fold difference in the current death rate per capita.

=== January 2021 ===
January 1: December became the first month with more than six thousand COVID-related fatalities according to accumulated data from the Texas Department of State Health Services (TDSHS).

January 7: A confirmed case of a new, more contagious SARS-CoV-2 variant from the United Kingdom was reported in Texas. The patient is resident of Harris County with no travel history.

January 12: As reported by Texas DSHS, the number of COVID-related fatalities exceeded 30 thousand, and is above 1/1000 amount total population. The fatalities (and likely infection spread) continue to be very different between metro and rural areas. While major metro counties, like Harris and Dallas, have fatality around 1/1200, less populated areas show substantially higher death rate. For instance, Lamb county has recently exceeded 0.5% (1/200) fatality rate, and on the date is already well above one fatality per 180 population.

January 13: For the first time Texas DSHS reported more than 400 new daily fatalities.

January 23: Texas DSHS states via press release that 332,750 COVID-19 vaccine doses will be distributed to 212 healthcare providers. An additional 216,350 doses have been ordered in advance to provide the public who received the first vaccine, the required second dose.

January 24: Texas Tribune reports 34,322 COVID-19 related fatalities have occurred in Texas.

January 25: Texas Department of State Health Services data shows that 265,786 people have been fully vaccinated. The CDC states the 7-day moving average of fatalities is 326.

January 28: A new highest fatality record, 471, was added by Texas DSHS on the day, after previous highest addition of 467 on January 27. However, with accelerating vaccinations of the most vulnerable populations this may hopefully become the last such "record."

January 31: In January (in 31 days) Texas DSHS reported 9,054 COVID-19 related fatalities. It is 1.5 times more than the previous highest number recorded just in the previous month, December 2020.

=== February 2021 ===
February 3: Texas DSHS reports 13,181 newly confirmed COVID-19 cases and 418 newly reported fatalities. The rates of confirmed cases and hospitalizations has gone down. In January 2021, the state reached over 2 million cases of COVID-19 according to the Texas Tribune.

February 5: Texas DSHS reported 2,140 COVID-related fatalities during last 7 days. This is lower as compared to 2,281 in the 7 days proceeding this week (the highest number), and even lower than 2,257 in 7 days earlier. The decline may be a result of vaccination. However, vaccination per capita in Texas is proceeding slower than the average within the USA, and substantially lower than in all four states bordering Texas according tо U.S. CDC.

February 11–14: A severe winter weather storm brought ice and snow conditions to much of the state creating delays in many people's ability to go out and receive the COVID-19 vaccination. On February 12, Governor Greg Abbott declared the storm a disaster and stated that the freezing temperatures and rain could pose severe threats to property, livestock, and lives.

February 15: With the intense cold and ice much of Texas lost power critically impacting the health care centers storing vaccines in freezers. Harris county delivered 5,410 doses of the vaccination to organizations they could safely travel to via frozen and icy roads.

February 16: Texas DSHS reports 2,981 new coronavirus infections. The Texas Tribune states that overall vaccine doses have increased during the last week citing that 4.1% of Texans have now received both doses of the vaccine to become fully vaccinated. The numbers of new cases of coronavirus infection, hospitalizations, and average new deaths credited to the Sars-CoV-2 disease have decreased in Texas. USA Today reports that the 400,000 vials of vaccine Texas was meant to receive this week will be delayed due to poor road conditions until February 17. The weather is causing many vaccination drives across the state in large cities and rural ones to cease operating as it's unsafe for the public to travel.

=== March 2021 ===
March 1: Texas DSHS reported 6456 covid-related fatalities during a short (28 days) month of February. It is the second highest number, after the previous month, January. Average daily fatalities in February became 231 after 292 in January, this is 21% decrease. However, Texas begins March with a rather small (smaller than the US average) decrease in fatalities.

March 11: Total number of covid-related fatalities, as reported by Texas DSHS, became higher than 45 thousand. The fatalities rate displays a clear lowering, as the last 5 thousand were added in 27 days, while previous 5 thousand were accumulated in 16 days.

March 17: With a potential "spring wave" of infection approaching, vaccination continues In Texas. Texas is still somewhat below average USA vaccination rate, and according to US CDC per 100 of population Texas administered 30.5 dosed as compare to 34.2 in the USA.

March 24: While a decrease of covid-related fatalities is becoming obvious as compare to numbers from January, Texas is displaying a somewhat worse results in comparison with the average progress in the USA. Thus, according to US CDC, in the last two weeks Texas recorded 1861 fatalities, which from US total of 14121 will represent 13.1%, and this is substantially higher than the Texas fraction in US population. The main reason is likely the rate of vaccination being slower than US average, resulting in additional deaths of 500 Texans in the last two weeks.

=== August 2021 ===
August 10: Due to low vaccination prevalence in some Texas population, the coronavirus infections and related deaths are quickly increasing again. According to data from Texas Department of State Health Services (see COVID-19 pandemic in Texas) the registered number of weekly covid-related deaths became near 400 for the last week (after being near 150 just a month ago). This death rate corresponds to infection rates at already increased level 2-3 weeks ago, because the death cases are increasing with a delay as compare to infection rates. During the last week the infection rate increases by about a factor of three from that level. Thus, in 2-3 weeks the weekly death rate will pass 1000 or even approach 1500.

August 11: For the first time after April 2, Texas DSHS again reported more than 100 covid-related daily fatalities in the state

August 25: According to Texas DPHS usual daily number of covid-related fatalities per weekday began to exceed 200, and continues to grow. Weekly fatalities exceeded 1000, for first time after the first half of Match. The fatalities growth indicates that the level of 2000 per week is achievable in two or three weeks. Most likely Texas will come to the first place in the number of covid-related fatalities amount all states, as it continues to be the highest in the current daily fatalities and has the lowest vaccination prevalence among large states.

=== September 2021 ===
September 1: Texas DSHS reported 320 covid-related fatalities, more than in any day in the previous 6 months, and the number accumulated in the last 7 days has arrived to 1500.

September 15: Texas DSHS reported more than 2000 covid-related fatalities during last 7 days. A level of unreported fatalities is likely increasing in many areas.
