= Carlos F. Truan =

American politician (1935–2012)

Carlos Flores Truan Sr.
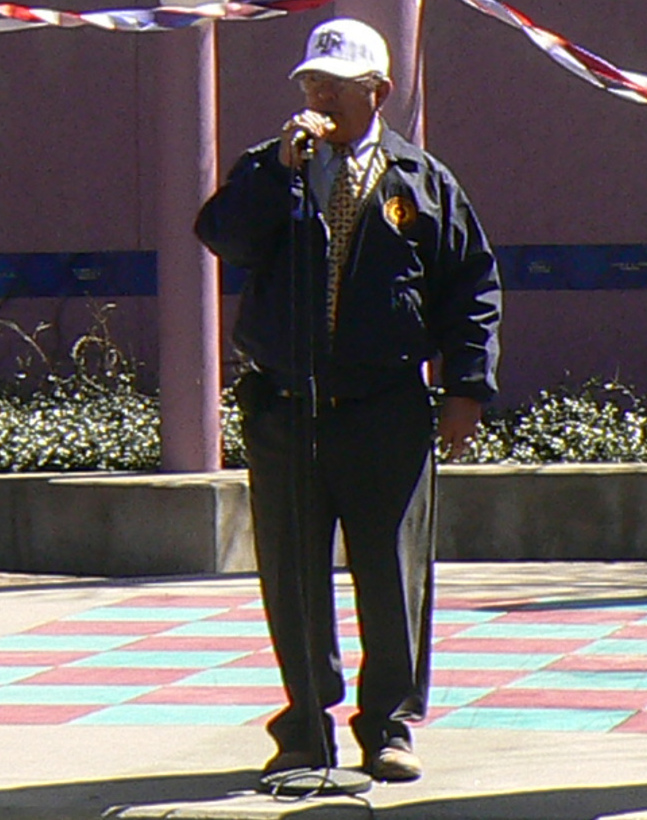
- Traun in 2008, campaigning for Hillary Clinton's presidential campaign

Member of the Texas State Senate from the 20th district
- In office January 14, 1977 – January 14, 2003
- Preceded by: Travis A. Peeler
- Succeeded by: Juan "Chuy" Hinojosa

President pro tempore of the Texas Senate
- In office September 8, 1986 – January 13, 1987
- Preceded by: Ed Howard
- Succeeded by: Carl A. Parker
- In office May 27, 1985 – September 4, 1986
- Preceded by: Ray Farabee
- Succeeded by: Ed Howard

Member of the Texas House of Representatives
- In office January 14, 1969 – January 14, 1977
- Preceded by: Mike McKinnon
- Succeeded by: Hugo Berlanga

Personal details
- Born: June 9, 1935 Kleberg County, Texas, U.S.
- Died: April 10, 2012 (aged 76) Corpus Christi, Texas
- Resting place: Texas State Cemetery
- Party: Democratic
- Education: Texas A&I University in Kingsville
- Occupation: Insurance agent

Carlos Flores Truan Sr. (June 9, 1935 – April 10, 2012), was an American businessman from Corpus Christi, Texas, who served for thirty-four years as a Democrat in both houses of the Texas Legislature. He was a state representative from 1969 to 1977 and a senator from 1977 until his retirement in 2003.

== Background ==
A native of Kleberg County, Truan worked various low-paying jobs as a youth to help support his single mother, Santos Flores Truan, and his siblings. In 1959, he graduated with a degree in business administration from Texas A&M University–Kingsville, then known as Texas A&I University in Kingsville, Texas. He was active in the Hispanic civil rights groups, the League of United Latin American Citizens and the American GI Forum. He was also a member the Kiwanis International.

In 1963, Truan married the former Elvira Munguia (born 1936), and the couple had four children, Carlos Truan Jr., Veronica Palmer, Rene Truan, and Maria Luisa Truan. He was a member of Most Precious Blood Catholic Church in Corpus Christi and the Roman Catholic men's organization, the Knights of Columbus.

== Legislative highlights ==
In 1968, Truan was first elected to the state House from District 48, which encompassed both Nueces and Kleberg counties. Truan served four two-year terms until he moved up to the Senate in 1977. In 1985, he was elected by his colleagues as the Senate President Pro Tem, the first Hispanic in Texas given this designation. In 1986, he served as "Governor for a Day". In 1995, he became the first Hispanic to be named Dean of the Texas Senate, the member with the greatest seniority. He would remain dean until he left the chamber in January 2003.

In 1969, Truan successfully sponsored the Texas Bilingual Education Act, which allowed for the first time some instruction in the Spanish language to non-English-speaking pupils. As a result of this legislation, he was called "the father of bilingual education".

Representative Truan sponsored the Texas Public Housing Authority Act of 1969, and the Interstate Placement of Children Act in 1975. He uncovered institutional child-care abuses in Texas and was the author of the Texas Child Care Licensing Act of 1975. As chairman of the Human Resources Committee, Truan pushed for the Texas Adult Education Act of 1973, which established the General Education Diploma.

Truan pushed successfully for legislation to regulate the flow of fresh water into South Texas bays and estuaries. He worked to protect redfish and brown shrimp. He targeted the problem of radioactive waste contaminating drinking water in South Texas. He sponsored the Texas Open Beaches Act and was instrumental in the establishment of the Coastal Bend Bays Foundation. He worked to include Corpus Christi Bay in the National Estuary Program.

In 1971, Representative Truan was among the "Dirty Thirty" legislators who sought ethics reforms in light of the Sharpstown banking scandal, which decimated the ranks of state legislators in the 1972 elections and caused the defeat of Speaker Gus Franklin Mutscher of Washington County.

In 1979, Senator Truan was among the twelve Democrats in the upper chamber known as the "Killer Bees" who went into hiding, mostly at an apartment in Austin, to prevent a quorum from legally acting on a bill that would have severed the presidential primary from the regular Texas state primary election. Had the legislation passed, Texas Democratic voters could, for instance, have crossed over into the Republican presidential primary and voted for former Governor John B. Connally Jr., of Texas or former Governor Ronald W. Reagan of California, the eventual nominee.

In 1981, Truan conducted a one-man filibuster and spoke nonstop for twenty hours to kill a bill related to the shrimping industry, important to the economy of his district. He wore a device by which he could relieve himself while engaging in the filibuster.

In 1993, Truan was chairman of the legislative conference committee that allocated more than $200 million for new construction and renovation at several universities in South Texas. He also sponsored the legislation that established a birth defects registry.

In 1999, Truan wrote the law which established the Texas A&M Coastal Bend Health Education Center in Corpus Christi, which conducts research and educates medical professionals. In 2001, he helped to secure the Irma Lerma Rangel College of Pharmacy at his alma mater, Texas A&M University-Kingsville, named for the late former legislator Irma Rangel.

Despite his long-term accomplishments, the magazine Texas Monthly in June 2001 added Truan to its annual list of "Top 10 Worst Legislators". Senior editor Paul Burka attributed the low rating to Truan's best work having been not in 2001 and his failure to work well with colleagues. Truan had long been known for browbeating members who tried to block his agenda. In 1998, however, Truan had been named among the 100 most influential Hispanics in the United States by the publication, Hispanic Business Magazine.

== Death and legacy ==
After he left the Senate, Truan engaged in his insurance business in Corpus Christi. In 1959, he had begun his career with New York Life Insurance Company and was a member of the Million Dollar Round Table. He died in Corpus Christi in the spring of 2012 at the age of seventy-six. He is interred at Texas State Cemetery in Austin.

In December 2003, the Carlos Truan Natural Resources Building at Texas A&M University - Corpus Christi, a facility for which he had obtained funding a decade earlier, was named in his honor. Carlos Truan Junior High School in the Edcouch-Elsa independent school District in Hidalgo County, Texas, is also named for him.

The Democrat Hugo Berlanga, who succeeded Truan in the Texas House and served there from 1977 until his resignation in 1998, recalled his mentor, accordingly: "He was as tough as they came, but he had a soft heart. He never forgot where his roots were. ... Once he became your advocate, he was your champion. Once he decided something was the right thing to do, there was no backing off. I learned a lot from him."

Texas House of Representatives
| Preceded by Travis A. Peeler | Member of the Texas House of Representatives from District 48-B (Corpus Christi); 1969–1977 | Succeeded by Hugo Berlanga |
Texas Senate
| Preceded by Mike McKinnon | Texas State Senator from District 20 (Corpus Christi); 1977–2003 | Succeeded by Juan "Chuy" Hinojosa |
| Preceded by Ed Howard | Texas Senate President Pro Tempore; 1985 | Succeeded by Carl A. Parker |
