= Kenney =

Kenney may refer to:

== People ==
- Kenney (name)

== Places ==
=== United States communities ===
- Kenney, Illinois
- Kenney, Texas

=== Geographical features ===
- Hotel Kenney, Rideau Lakes, Ontario, Canada
- Kenney Dam, a hydroelectric dam on the Nechako River, British Columbia, Canada
- Kenney Glacier, Trinity Peninsula, Antarctica
- Kenney Nunatak, a nunatak rising in Waddington Glacier, Antarctica
- Mount Kenney, a sharp summit in the Cathedral Peaks, Prince Olav Mountains, Antarctica

== See also ==
- Kenn (disambiguation)
- Kennedy (disambiguation)
- Kenny (disambiguation)
- Kinne (disambiguation)
- Kinnie (disambiguation)
- Kinney (disambiguation)
