= McKinney (surname) =

McKinney is a surname. Notable people with the surname include:

- Alice Cary McKinney (1865-1928), American temperance and social reformer
- Anthony McKinney (died 2013), a convicted murderer in Illinois whose guilt has been questioned
- Baylus Benjamin McKinney (1886–1952), American singer, songwriter, and music editor
- Ben McKinney (born 2004), English cricketer
- Betsy McKinney (born 1939), American politician from New Hampshire
- Bevin McKinney, co-inventor of the Roton rocket
- Bill McKinney (1931–2011), American actor
- Billy McKinney (baseball) (born 1994), American baseball player
- Bill McKinney (1895–1969), American jazz drummer
- Billy McKinney (politician) (1927–2010), American politician from Georgia (and father of Cynthia McKinney)
- Chance McKinney, American singer
- Charlotte McKinney (born 1993), American model and actress
- Chris McKinney (born 1973), American writer
- Cole McKinney (born 2007), American ice hockey player
- Collin McKinney (1766–1861), American merchant and politician from Texas and one of the drafters of the Texas Declaration of Indepndence
- Cynthia McKinney (born 1955), American politician from Georgia, Green Party nominee for president in 2008
- D. Frank McKinney (1928–2001), British ornithologist and ethologist
- Demetria McKinney (born 1981), American actress and songwriter
- Dennis McKinney (born 1960), American politician from Kansas
- DJ McKinney (born 2004), American football player
- Donavan McKinney (born 1992), American politician from Michigan
- Fearghal McKinney (born 1962), Northern Irish television presenter and journalist
- Florine McKinney (1909–1975), American actress
- Frank McKinney (1938–1992), American swimmer
- Frank E. McKinney (1904–1974), American banker and chair of the Democratic National Committee from 1951 to 1952
- Gene C. McKinney (born 1950), American soldier
- Hannah McKinney, American politician from Michigan
- Irene McKinney, American poet and editor
- Jack McKinney (basketball) (1935–2018), American basketball coach
- Jack McKinney (writer), pseudonym used by American writers James Luceno and Brian Daley
- Jeremy McKinney (born 1976), American football player
- Jimmy McKinney (born 1983), American basketball player and film actor
- Joe McKinney (born 1967), Irish actor
- John F. McKinney (1827–1903), American politician from Ohio
- John R. McKinney (1921–1997), American soldier who received the Medal of Honor in World War II
- Joseph Crescent McKinney (1928–2010), Roman Catholic bishop
- Joyce McKinney (born 1949), alleged rapist in the Manacled Mormon case
- Justin Aynsley McKinney (born 1978), American musician and super accountant
- Kelsey McKinney, American journalist and author
- Kennedy McKinney (born 1966), American boxer
- Kurt McKinney (born 1962), American actor
- Larry J. McKinney (1944–2017), American judge
- Louise McKinney (1868–1931), Canadian politician from Alberta
- Mark McKinney (born 1959), Canadian comedian and actor
- Mary McKinney (1873–1987), American recognised as "the world's oldest person" at the time of her death
- May Mourning Farris McKinney (1874-1959), American non-profit executive
- Mike McKinney (militiaman) (1840–1925), American Civil War veteran and railroad tycoon
- Mike McKinney (born 1951), American politician from Texas
- Mira McKinney (1892-1978), Film and Television actress
- Nathaniel McKinney (born 1982), Bahamian athlete
- Nina Mae McKinney (1913–1967), American actress
- Philip W. McKinney (1832–1899), American politician from Virginia
- Richard McKinney (born 1953), American archer and author
- Samuel B. McKinney (1926–2018), Baptist minister and civil rights leader in Seattle
- Samuel McKinney (1807–1879), Irish-born Presbyterian minister in the American South
- Seth McKinney (born 1979), American football player
- Shanece McKinney (born 1992), American basketball player
- Steve McKinney (born 1975), American football player
- Stewart McKinney (politician) (1931–1987), American politician from Connecticut
- Tamara McKinney (born 1962), American alpine ski racer
- Terrell McKinney (born 1990), American politician from Nebraska
- Tom McKinney, Irish rugby league footballer
- Xavier McKinney (born 1999), American football player

== See also ==
- McKinnie, surname
