= Kenn =

Kenn or KENN may refer to:

== People ==
- Kenn (actor) (born 1982), Japanese actor
- Kenn Collier, American politician

== Places ==
- Kenn, Devon, a village in England
- Kenn, Germany, a municipality in Rhineland-Palatinate, Germany
- Kenn, Somerset, a village in England

== Other uses ==
- KENN (AM), American radio station

== See also ==
- Kenne
- Kann (disambiguation)
