= Anna M. Cooley =

American home economist

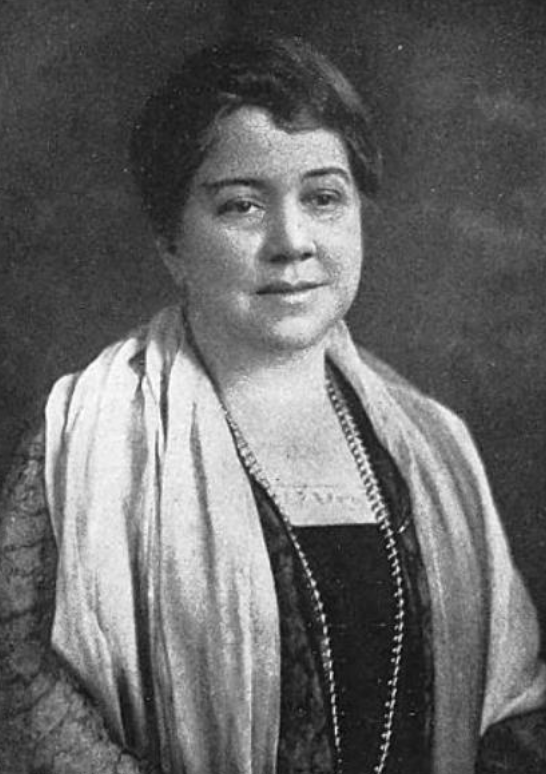
- Cooley, from a 1928 publication
- Born: Anna Maria Cooley; September 16, 1874; New York, New York, U.S.
- Died: May 6, 1955 (age 80); Pawling, New York, U.S.
- Occupations: Home economist, textbook writer

Anna Maria Cooley (September 16, 1874 – May 6, 1955) was an American home economist and textbook writer. She was a professor of household arts at Teachers College, Columbia University, from 1904 to 1941. She was president of the New York State Home Economics Association from 1924 to 1928.

== Early life and education ==
Cooley was born in New York City as the daughter of Charles Wallace Cooley and Emma Davin Cooley. She graduated from Barnard College in 1896. She completed a Bachelor of Science degree at Teachers College, Columbia University in 1903. Her sister, Carrie Starr Cooley, was a noted nurse in New York.

== Career ==
Cooley taught at Teachers College, Columbia University, from 1904 until she retired in 1941. She became an associate professor of household arts in 1917. She was president of the New York State Home Economics Association from 1924 to 1928.

== Publications ==
Cooley wrote several textbooks with her colleague Helen Kinne and others.

- Occupations for Little Fingers: A Manual for Grade Teachers, Mothers and Settlement Workers (1905, with Elizabeth Sage)
- "Selection of domestic art subject matter for secondary schools" (1909)
- Domestic Art in Women's Education (1911)
- Shelter and Clothing: A Textbook of the Household Arts (1914, with Helen Kinne)
- Food and Household Management: A Textbook of the Household Arts (1914, with Helen Kinne)
- "The Amy Schussler Apartment" (1915)
- The Home and the Family: An Elementary Textbook of Home Making (1917, with Helen Kinne)
- Food and Health: An Elementary Textbook of Home Making (1917, with Helen Kinne)
- "How Economics Studies in Grades Seven to Twelve" (1918, with Cora M. Winchell, Wilhelmina Spohr, and Josephine A. Marshall)
- Teaching Home Economics (1919, with Cora Marguerite Winchell, Wilhelmina H. Spohr, and Josephine Atlee Marshall)
- Household Arts for Home and School (1920, with Wilhelmina H. Spohr)
- "Some Investigations concerning the use of Certain Home Economics Information Tests" (1923, with Grace Reeves)
- "Economics and home economics instruction in the schools" (1932)
- "Some Reminiscences of Teachers College" (1939)

== Personal life ==
Cooley died in 1955, at the age of 80, at her home in Pawling, New York. Her papers are in special collections at Teachers College, Columbia University.
