= Mike McKinney =

American politician (born 1951)

Chair of the Texas Pharmaceutical Initiative Board
- Incumbent
- Assumed office January 3, 2024
- Governor: Greg Abbott
- Preceded by: Position established

13th Chancellor of The Texas A&M University System
- In office November 23, 2006 – July 1, 2011
- Preceded by: Robert McTeer
- Succeeded by: John Sharp

Commissioner of the Texas Department of Health and Human Services
- In office 1995–1998
- Governor: George W. Bush
- Preceded by: Richard Ladd
- Succeeded by: Don Gilbert

Speaker pro tempore of the Texas House of Representatives
- In office 1989–1990
- Preceded by: Hugo Berlanga
- Succeeded by: Wilhelmina Ruth Delco

Member of the Texas House of Representatives from the 15th district
- In office April 9, 1984 – January 8, 1991
- Preceded by: Jim Turner
- Succeeded by: Kevin Brady

Personal details
- Born: Michael Dean McKinney; July 5, 1951 (age 75)
- Party: Democratic
- Spouse: Lou Ann Sherbrook
- Children: 3; including Stephen and Seth
- Education: University of Houston (BS); University of Texas Medical Branch (MD)

Michael Dean McKinney (born July 5, 1951) is an American politician and former family physician serving as the chair of the Texas Pharmaceutical Initiative Governing Board since 2024. A member of the Democratic Party, he previously served as the 13th chancellor of The Texas A&M University System from 2006 to 2011. He also served as a member of the Texas House of Representatives from 1984 to 1991.

In 1995, McKinney was appointed by the then-governor George W. Bush to be the commissioner of the Texas Department of Health and Human Services. From April 9, 1984, to January 8, 1991, McKinney was a member of the Texas House of Representatives and represented the 15th district. From 1989 to 1990 he was speaker pro tempore. Prior to being elected to the Texas House of Representatives, he practiced family medicine and was the lone physician in Centerville, Texas, for 16 years.

== Early life and education ==
Michael Dean McKinney was born on July 5, 1951. He grew up in Pasadena, Texas. McKinney attended Pasadena ISD Gardens, Golden Acres, and Bailey elementary schools and Southmore Intermediate School. He graduated from Sam Rayburn High School in 1969.

After high school, McKinney attended the University of Houston in Houston, Texas, later graduating with a Bachelor of Science degree in biology in 1973. After graduating from the University of Houston, he attended the University of Texas Medical Branch in Galveston, Texas, and graduated with a Doctor of Medicine degree in 1976.

== Career ==
After graduating from medical school in Galveston, McKinney felt the moral responsibility to serve in a rural area where there were not any physicians and became the only physician in Centerville for 16 years. He also helped open the Leon Memorial Hospital in Buffalo, Texas, while practicing family medicine. After serving as a city councilman and mayor of Centerville, he decided to run for office in the Texas House of Representatives and was elected in 1984. McKinney was the speaker pro tempore of the Texas House of Representatives from 1989 to 1990. In 1995, he was appointed by the then-governor and future president of the United States, George W. Bush, to be the commissioner of the Texas Department of Health and Human Services. McKinney served as Rick Perry's chief of staff from August 2001 until his resignation on November 6, 2002. In 2003, he became the CEO and senior vice president of the Texas A&M Health Science Center. on November 23, 2006, he was appointed as the 13th chancellor of the Texas A&M University System. He resigned as chancellor in 2011.

On January 3, 2024, McKinney was appointed as the chair of the Texas Pharmaceutical Initiative Governing Board by Texas governor Greg Abbott. The Board is tasked with developing a business plan to provide cost effective drugs and other medical supplies for the public employee sector.

== Personal life ==
McKinney is married to Lou Ann Sherbrook McKinney. They have three children, two of whom, Steve McKinney and Seth McKinney, played as offensive linemen for Texas A&M and in the NFL.

On November 3, 2001, McKinney attended a Texas A&M and Texas Tech football game in which his son Seth was playing, and a brawl broke out after the final score, with Tech winning 0-12. A short time after the end of the game, Tech fans tore down the goal post at the south end of Jones SBC Stadium before making their way to the north end of the field, where they tried to force the goal post through a section primarily filled with fans of the Aggies. As a result of the altercation, he received a cut above his right eye that required eight stitches from the A&M team physician in the locker room. McKinney initially claimed that the injury was from Tech students, but upon further review of stadium footage of the brawl, Texas Tech University president David Schmidly confirmed that it was caused by a student from A&M. No police charges were filed after the incident.

On June 29, 2011, it was reported that his son Seth intended to run for the seat in the Texas House of Representatives 14th district, vacated by State Representative Fred Brown after his resignation. A campaign logo was released. However, the following month it was announced that he was no longer running.

== Awards ==
- 1989 10 Best Members of the 71st Texas Legislature, Texas Monthly Magazine July 1989
- 2006 Physician's Recognition Award, AMA
- 2006 Presidential Award of Merit for Exemplary Service, Texas Academy of Family Practice
- 2009 Ashbel Smith Distinguished Alumnus Award, UTMB School of Medicine Alumni Association
- 2011 Pasadena ISD's Distinguished Alumnus of 2011
