= Kenny (disambiguation) =

Kenny is a common given name and surname.

It may also refer to:

== Places ==
In the United States:

- Kenny, Minneapolis, a neighborhood
- Kenney, Illinois, a village

In Australia:

- Kenny, Australian Capital Territory, a planned suburb in the Canberra district of Gungahlin

In outer space:

- 10107 Kenny, an asteroid

== Entertainment ==
- Kenny (1988 film), a Canadian documentary
- Kenny (2006 film), an Australian mockumentary
- Kenny G, stage name of jazz saxophonist Kenneth Bruce Gorelick (born 1956)
- Kenny (band), a mid-1970s glamrock/pop band from London
- Kenny (album), a 1979 music album by Kenny Rogers
- Kenny, a 2018 short film by Jennette McCurdy

== See also ==
- Kenney (disambiguation)
- Kinne (disambiguation)
- Kinney (disambiguation)
- Kinnie (disambiguation)
