= Kinnie (disambiguation) =

Kinnie is a Maltese soft drink.

Kinnie, kinnies, or variation, may refer to:

== People ==
- Kinnie Laisné (born 1989) French tennis player
- Kinnie Larson, wife of U.S. musician Taylor Larson
- Kinnie Starr (born 1970) Canadian artist
- Kinnie Wagner (1903–1958) U.S. anti-Prohibition alcohol smuggler

== Other uses ==
- Kinnie, a member of the otherkin subculture
- Kinnie a nickname for a Kinescope
- Kinnie, an alternate form of the given name and surname Kenny

== See also ==
- McKinnie (surname)
- Kenney (disambiguation)
- Kenny (disambiguation)
- Kinne (disambiguation)
- Kinney (disambiguation)
