= Seth McKinney =

American football player (born 1979)

No. 68
- Position: Center / Guard

Personal information
- Born: June 12, 1979 (age 47); Centerville, Texas, U.S.
- Listed height: 6 ft 3 in (1.91 m)
- Listed weight: 310 lb (141 kg)

Career information
- High school: Westlake (Austin, Texas)
- College: Texas A&M
- NFL draft: 2002: 3rd round, 90th overall pick

Career history
- Miami Dolphins (2002–2006); Cleveland Browns (2007–2008); Buffalo Bills (2009)

Awards and highlights
- Second-team All-American (2001); Third-team All-American (2000); 2× First-team All-Big 12 (2000, 2001)

Career NFL statistics
- Games played: 85
- Games started: 45
- Fumble recoveries: 2
- Stats at Pro Football Reference

Seth Alan McKinney (born June 12, 1979) is an American former professional football player who was a center in the National Football League (NFL). He was selected by the Miami Dolphins in the third round of the 2002 NFL draft. After several years with the Dolphins, McKinney also played for the Cleveland Browns and briefly for the Buffalo Bills. McKinney played college football for the Texas A&M Aggies and is the younger brother of former NFL offensive lineman Steve McKinney and son of former Texas A&M University System Chancellor Mike McKinney. He was inducted into the Texas A&M Athletics Hall of Fame in 2024.

== Early life ==
Seth McKinney was born on June 12, 1979, in Centerville, Texas, where his father, Mike McKinney, was the only doctor in the town for 16 years. From there they moved to Clear Lake, Texas, then to Austin, Texas, where his father was a member of the Texas House of Representatives. He attended Westlake High School in Austin beginning his junior year, and was classmates with Drew Brees and Chris Mihm. He helped win the Div-II 5A State Championship in 1996, in which he was voted a team captain, and named into the 5A all-state selection twice. He was also a state finalist in the shot put in 1996.

In 2006, he was named to the Big 12 10th Anniversary Team. In 2009, he was awarded for his success in High School Football by being selected to the UIL All-Century team.

== College career ==
McKinney was a four-year starter at Texas A&M. He started 50 consecutive contests (including bowl games)(2nd most at Texas A&M) during his time with the Aggies and is only the fifth center in NCAA Division I-A history to start every game in a career. McKinney earned consensus All-Big 12 Conference honors and was an Academic All-Big 12 first-team choice, as well as a finalist for the Dave Rimington Trophy, given to the nation's top center. He was also selected a third team All-American by the Associated Press as a junior, and second team All-American by the AP as a Senior. In votes by his own teammates, he was awarded offensive lineman of the year in 2000 & 2001, offensive MVP in 2001, and team captain in 2001. He received a BBA and MS in Management Information Systems. In 2015, McKinney was voted into the 100 top sports players at Texas A&M.

== Professional career ==
=== Miami Dolphins ===
McKinney was a third-round draft choice (90th overall) by the Miami Dolphins in the 2002 NFL draft. In his rookie year he played in all 16 games. He made his NFL debut at the Minnesota Vikings on December 21. In 2003, he again played in all 16 games. He started in all 16 games in 2004, for the first time in his career and the only member of the offensive line to do so. In 2005, he was part of the offensive line that allowed only 26 sacks, the fourth lowest in the league. He started in the opening 13 games but leg injury forced him out of the final three games. He did not feature at all in the 2006 season after undergoing surgery to repair a disk in his neck.

=== Cleveland Browns ===
On March 14, 2007, McKinney signed with the Cleveland Browns two weeks after his release from the Dolphins. McKinney started in 8 games in 2007 for the Cleveland Browns, before he was placed on injured reserve on November 10, 2007, ending his season. He was re-signed by the team on March 28, 2008.

=== Buffalo Bills ===
McKinney was signed by the Buffalo Bills on April 9, 2009.

In his first start of the season versus Jacksonville, Seth suffered a season ending ACL tear in his right knee.

== Political career ==
On June 29, 2011, it was reported that McKinney intended to run for the seat in the Texas House of Representatives 14th district, vacated by Fred Brown after his resignation. A campaign logo was released. However, it was soon announced he was no longer running in the election.
