= Kinney Drugs =

American regional pharmacy chain

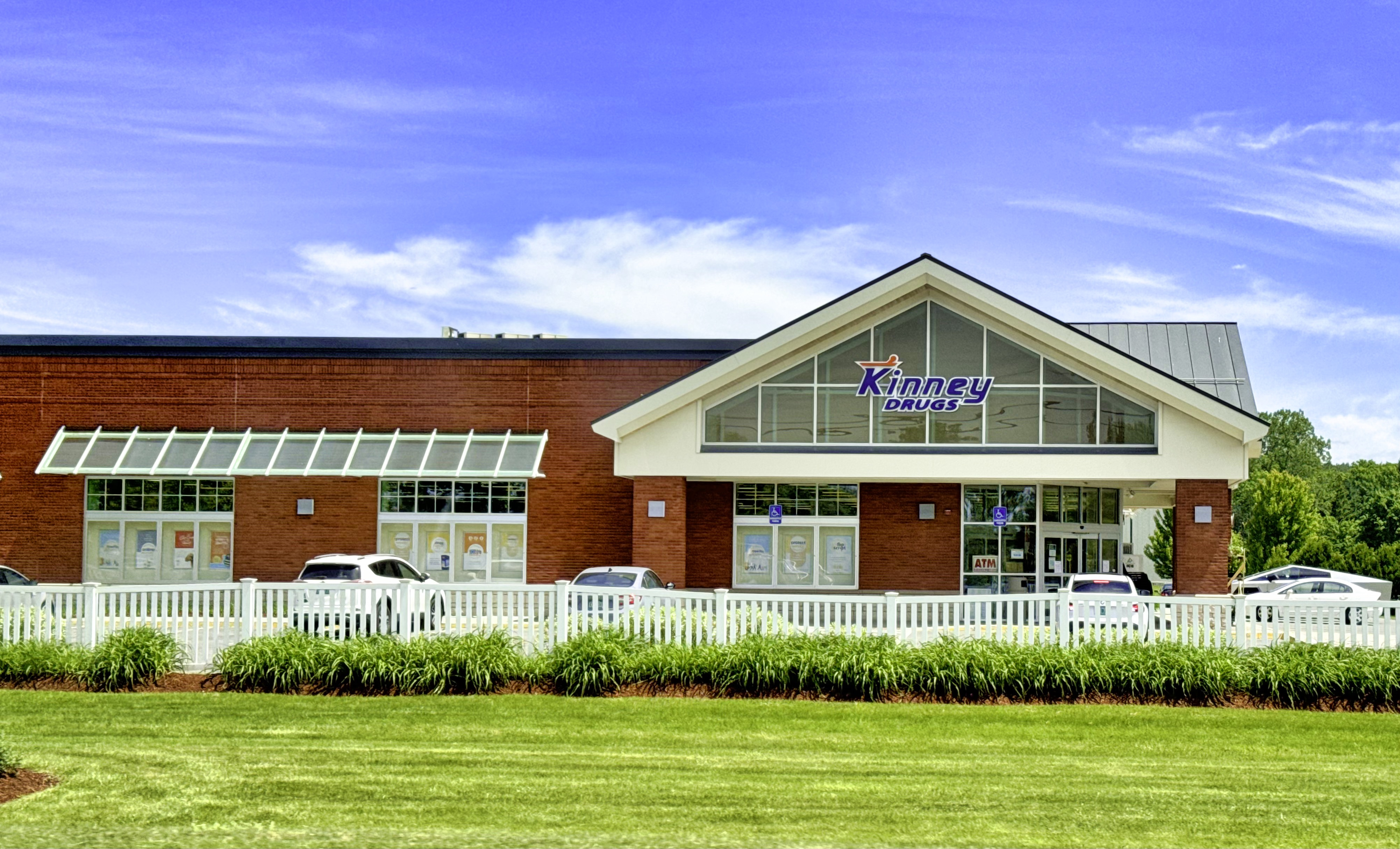
- A modern Kinney Drugs store in Shelburne, Vermont, 2024
- Industry: Retail
- Founded: 1903; 123 years ago in Gouverneur, New York, U.S.
- Founder: Burt Orrin Kinney
- Headquarters: Gouverneur, New York
- Area served: New York and Vermont, USA
- Key people: John Marraffa Jr. (President)
- Products: Pharmacy
- Parent: KPH Healthcare Services
- Website: kinneydrugs.com

Kinney Drugs is an American chain of drugstores throughout upstate New York and Vermont. The chain specializes in providing services to small communities.

== History ==
The company was founded in 1903 by Burt Orrin Kinney, a native of Gouverneur, New York. The first drugstore was opened in Gouverneur and is currently in operation. In 1962, a distribution center was opened.

In 2002 the company created the Kinney Drugs Foundation which makes awards to local and national charities.

In 2008, Kinney Drugs became owned by its employees. The company held a stock buyback for the 60 percent of the 2.84 million shares of company stock which were held by people who did not work for the company. The reorganization had the company paying $90 per share to buy back stock at an estimated cost of $140 million.

In 2025, Kinney Drugs introduced Ask Burt, an AI-powered virtual assistant that helps individuals determine which vaccines they may be eligible for. Ask Burt is named after the company’s founder. Ask Burt carries updated guidance for vaccine eligibility for a range of vaccinations, including COVID, influenza (Flu), Respiratory Syncytial Virus (RSV), pneumonia, and shingles.

== Locations ==
Kinney Drugs operates primarily throughout the metropolitan areas of Syracuse, Watertown, and Plattsburgh. About 20% of the company's stores are in Vermont and they opened their first drugstore in Saint Albans in the mid-1900s. Many locations have freestanding stores with drive-thru pharmacies. The pharmacy also offers free delivery.
