= Helen Kinne =

American home economist (1861–1917)

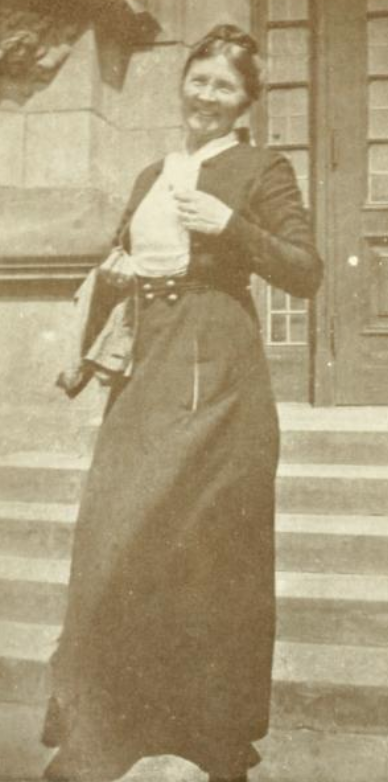
- Helen Kinne, from a 1918 memorial booklet
- Born: January 31, 1861; Norwich, Connecticut
- Died: December 29, 1917 (age 56); New York City
- Occupations: Home economist, college professor, textbook writer

Helen Kinne (January 31, 1861 – December 29, 1917) was an American home economist. She was a professor of domestic science at Teachers College, Columbia University, and she wrote several college textbooks in her field. She was "a pioneer worker and national leader in the development of home economics."

== Early life and education ==
Kinne was born in Norwich, Connecticut, and raised in Providence, Rhode Island, the daughter of Henry Clay Kinne and Helen Waterman Kinne. She graduated from Teachers College, Columbia University in 1891.

== Career ==
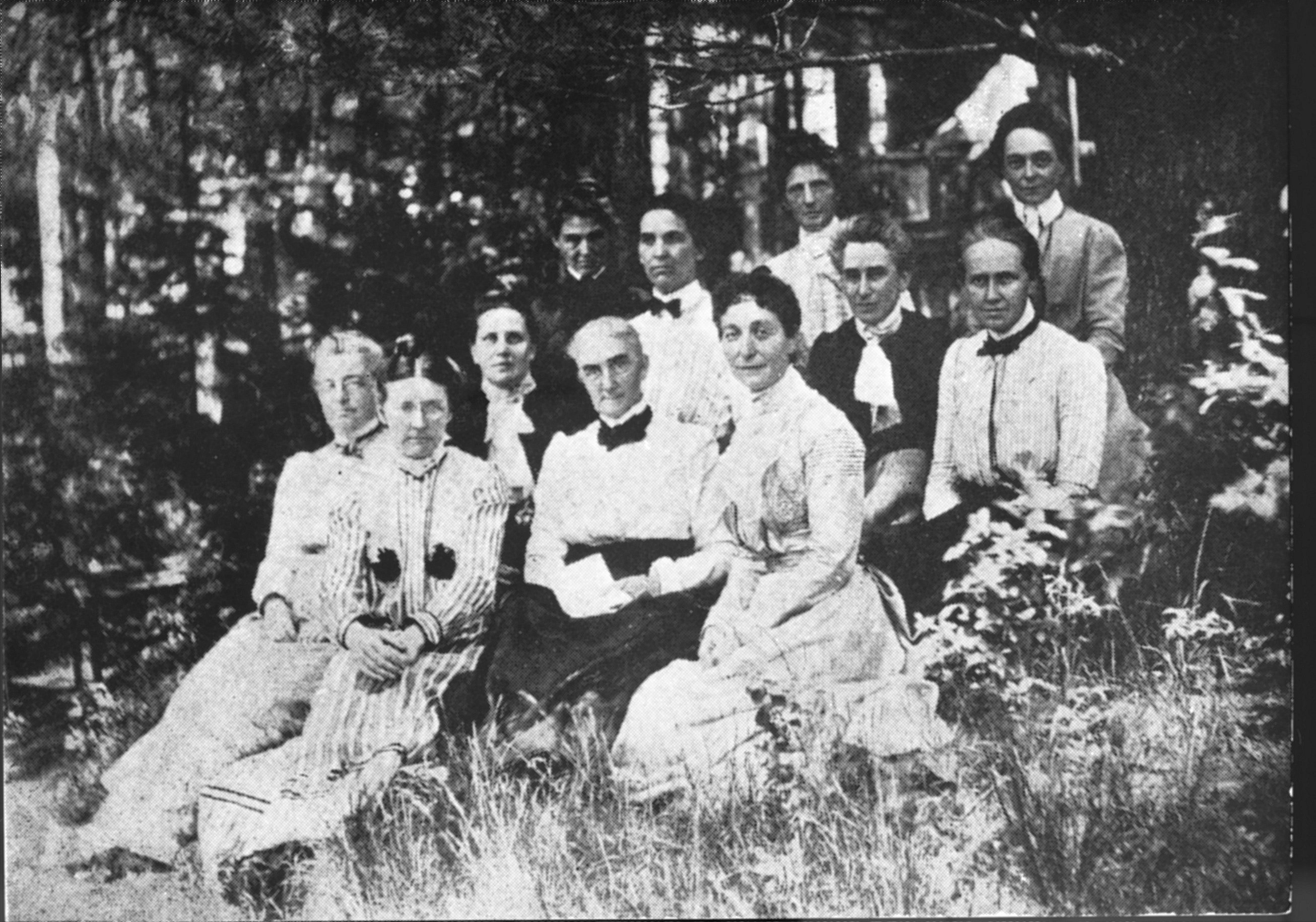
Home economists meeting in 1906; Kinne is in the front row, wearing a striped dress, next to Ellen Swallow Richards (in the black skirt). - (3856195710)

Kinne was an instructor at Teachers College, Columbia University from 1891 to 1898, and from 1898 until her death in 1917 she was a professor of domestic science there. She was head of the household arts education department. She attended the first Lake Placid Conference on Home Economics in 1899, and organized the Home Economics Association of Greater New York in 1908; she was president of the latter organization for its first three years. She was one of the founders of the American Home Economics Association in 1909, and associate editor of the association's journal.

Kinne was active in the Woman's Club of Woodbury, Connecticut. She also maintained a small farm, called Uplands, in Connecticut.

== Publications ==
Kinne wrote several textbooks with her colleague Anna M. Cooley.

- "School Luncheons" (1905)
- "The Vocational Value of the Household Arts" (1910)
- Equipment for Teaching Domestic Sciences (1911)
- Shelter and Clothing: a Textbook of the Household Arts (1913, with Anna M. Cooley)
- Foods and Household Management: A Textbook of the Household Arts (1914, with Anna M. Cooley)
- Clothing and Health: An Elementary Textbook of Home Making (1916, with Anna M. Cooley)
- Food and Health: an Elementary Textbook of Home Making (1916, with Anna M. Cooley)
- The Home and the Family: an Elementary Textbook of Home Making (1917, with Anna M. Cooley)

== Personal life ==
Kinne was on an extended sabbatical for health reasons when she died from acute colitis in 1917, at the age of 56, in New York City.
