= Kenne =

Kenne is a given name and a surname.

Notable people with the given name include:

- Kenne Duncan (1903–1972), Canadian actor
- Kenne Fant (1923–2016), Swedish actor, director, and writer

Notable people with the surname include:

- Leslie F. Kenne (born 1949), United States Air Force veteran
- Raoul Kenne (born 1994), Cameroonian footballer
