= James Kinney =

James Kinney may refer to:

- James Kinney (politician) (1869–1941), politician in Alberta, Canada
- James Kinney (basketball) (born 1990), American basketball player
- James A.R. Kinney, African Nova Scotian accountant, community leader, and a co-founder of the Colored Hockey League

== See also ==
- James Kinney Farmstead, Belmont, Ohio, United States
