= Steve McKinney =

American football player (born 1975)

No. 76
- Positions: Center, guard

Personal information
- Born: October 15, 1975 (age 51); Galveston, Texas, U.S.
- Listed height: 6 ft 4 in (1.93 m)
- Listed weight: 310 lb (141 kg)

Career information
- High school: Clear Lake (Houston, Texas)
- College: Texas A&M
- NFL draft: 1998: 4th round, 93rd overall pick

Career history
- Indianapolis Colts (1998–2001); Houston Texans (2002–2007); Miami Dolphins (2008)*; Seattle Seahawks (2008)
- * Offseason or practice squad member only

Awards and highlights
- PFWA All-Rookie Team (1998); Second-team All-Big 12 (1997); All-State (1993)

Career NFL statistics
- Games played: 143
- Games started: 133
- Fumble recoveries: 3
- Stats at Pro Football Reference

Stephen Michael McKinney (born October 15, 1975) is an American former professional football player who was an offensive guard in the National Football League (NFL). He was selected by the Indianapolis Colts with the first pick in the Fourth round (93rd overall)1998 NFL draft. He played college football for the Texas A&M Aggies.

He is the older brother of former NFL offensive lineman Seth McKinney. He is the first-born son of former Texas A&M University System Chancellor Mike McKinney.

== Early life ==
McKinney grew up in Centerville, Texas, where his father, Mike McKinney, was the only physician for 16 years. He played football, basketball and baseball through his sophomore year. As a sophomore, he was named first team All-District 23-2A in Football and Basketball. Before his Junior year, McKinney and his family moved to Clear Lake High School in Houston, Texas. He lettered in basketball and started at defensive end and tight end in football. As a senior, he was named 1st team All-District as a TE and DE, as well as being named 24-5A District CO-MVP. He graduated from Clear Lake High School in 1994. In 2005, Clear Lake High School retired McKinney's number 88 jersey.

== College career ==
McKinney then went to play for Texas A&M University and saw action as reserve defensive end as freshman and accumulated three tackles. He started the final eight games of sophomore season at left guard. As a junior, McKinney started at left guard the entire season and earned second-team All-Big 12 honors as the offense averaged 404.5 yards per game. He started 12 games as a senior season at left guard and earned first-team All-Big 12 honors and helped the offense average 205.4 yards per game rushing. He was a four-year letterman and three-year starter for the Aggies, and started the final 32 games of his career at left guard.

In 2015, McKinney was voted onto the Texas A&M Top 100 Football Players of All-Time list.

== Professional career ==
=== Indianapolis Colts ===
McKinney was selected in the fourth round of the 1998 NFL draft with the 93rd overall pick by the Indianapolis Colts. In 1998, he started all 16 games at left guard and was one of only four NFL rookie offensive linemen to start each game at only guard. He was the fourth guard in Colts history to earn all-rookie honors and was a member of a line that allowed 22 sacks, second-lowest total in the NFL. In 1999, he started 14 games at left guard and missed the first snap of his career when he was inactive at Philadelphia. He was inactive for two more games after an emergency appendectomy.

In the 2000 and 2001 McKinney started a total of 30 games for the Colts.

=== Houston Texans ===
He then left the Colts as a free agent during the 2002 NFL Season. He was the first unrestricted free agent to be signed by the Houston Texans. He started all 16 games at center and handled every offensive snap. In 2003 he started all 16 games at center for the second consecutive season and joined Chester Pitts as the only two Texans offensive linemen to start all 32 games in the club's brief history. He then started all 32 games for the 2004 and 2005 seasons for the Texans.

On September 23, 2007, McKinney suffered a torn ACL in a loss to the Colts. He was placed on injured reserve, ending his season. He was released the following offseason.

=== Miami Dolphins ===
On May 18, 2008, McKinney was signed by the Miami Dolphins. His younger brother, Seth McKinney, was drafted by and played for the Dolphins from 2002 to 2006. The team released McKinney on August 18.

=== Seattle Seahawks ===
McKinney was signed by the Seattle Seahawks on December 5, 2008, after guard Mike Wahle was placed on injured reserve.

== Other ventures ==
McKinney was a minority owner of the Freebirds World Burrito chain from 2003 to 2007 before the company was sold to a larger conglomerate.

McKinney also operated Velocity Sports Performance training centers in the Houston area from 2004 to 2008. From 2007 to 2011 McKinney owned and operated his own hunting and whitetail deer breeding operation called McKinney Whitetails, in Marquez, Texas, near his hometown of Centerville.

McKinney now owns and operates McDonald's restaurants in the Greater Houston and Brazos Valley area. www.mckinneymcd.com
