= McKinnie =

McKinnie is a surname. Notable people with the surname include:

- Alfonzo McKinnie (born 1992), American basketball player
- Bryant McKinnie (born 1979), American football player
- Burt McKinnie (1879–1946), American golfer
- Eric "Ricky" McKinnie (born 1952), American musician
- Miriam McKinnie (1906–1987), American artist

== See also ==
- McKinney (surname)
- Kinnie (disambiguation)
- McKinney (disambiguation)
