= Elam A. Kinne =

American politician (1832–1913)

Member of the Connecticut House of Representatives from Voluntown
- In office 1907–1909
- Preceded by: James M. Whitman
- Succeeded by: E. Byron Gallup

Personal details
- Born: November 28, 1832 South Kingstown, Rhode Island, U.S.
- Died: April 13, 1913 (aged 80) Voluntown, Connecticut, U.S.
- Party: Republican

Elam A. Kinne (November 28, 1832 – April 13, 1913) was an American politician who served in the Connecticut House of Representatives from 1907 to 1909, representing the town of Voluntown as a Republican.
