= Hugo Berlanga =

American politician (born 1948)

Speaker pro tempore of the Texas House of Representatives
- In office January 19, 1983 – 1989
- Preceded by: James E. Laney
- Succeeded by: Michael D. McKinney

Member of the Texas House of Representatives from the 34th district
- In office January 11, 1983 – March 6, 1998

Member of the Texas House of Representatives from the 48-B district
- In office January 11, 1977 – January 11, 1983

Personal details
- Born: August 16, 1948 (age 77) Robstown, Texas, U.S.
- Party: Democratic
- Profession: consultant

Hugo Berlanga (born August 16, 1948) is an American politician. He was elected as a Democratic representative for the 48-B district in 1976. He was also the representative for the 34th district in the Texas House of Representatives from January 11, 1983 to March 6, 1998.
