= Texas Health and Human Services Commission =

State government agency in Austin, Texas, U.S.

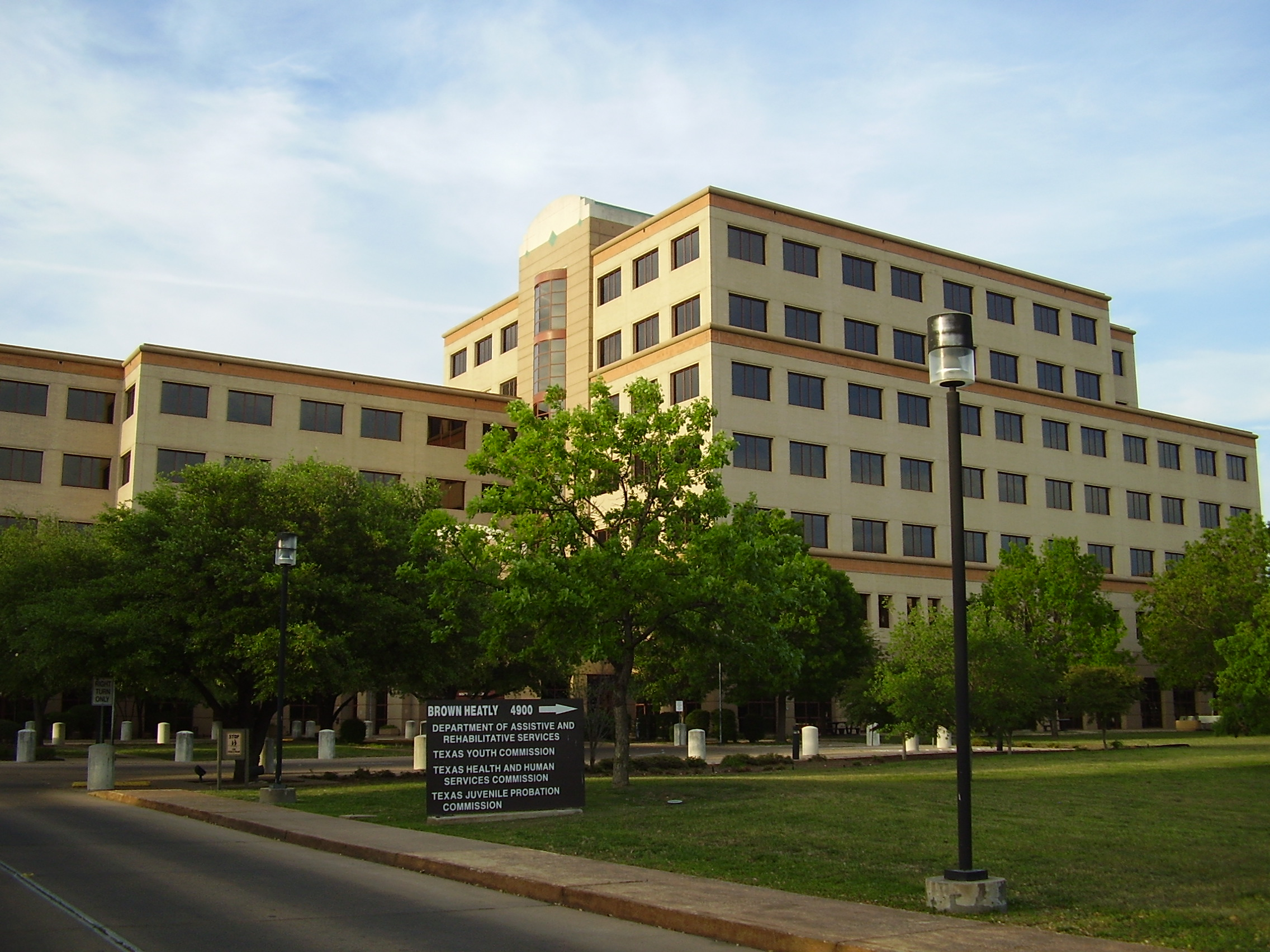
- The Brown-Heatly Building houses the commission's headquarters in Austin
- Established: 1991; 35 years ago
- Headquarters: 4900 N Lamar Blvd., Austin, Texas, U.S.
- Website: hhs.texas.gov

The Texas Health and Human Services Commission (HHSC) is an agency within the Texas Health and Human Services System. The Texas Health and Human Services Commission was created in 1991 by Governor Ann Richards through House Bill 7. Bill 2292 in 2003 during the 78th Legislature, which consolidated twelve different healthcare agencies into five entities under the oversight of HHSC.

In September 2016, Texas began transforming how it delivers health and human services to qualified Texans, with a goal of making the Health and Human Services System more efficient and effective. Sept. 1, 2017, marked another major milestone in this transformation.

The new accountable, restructured system:

- Makes it easier for people to find out about the services or benefits for which they may qualify.
- Better integrates programs by removing bureaucratic silos and grouping similar programs and services together.
- Creates clear lines of accountability within the organization.
- Includes well-defined and objective performance metrics for all organizational areas.

Texas Health and Human Services now consists of 2 agencies: the Texas Health and Human Services Commission and the Texas Department of State Health Services (DSHS). HHS is headquartered in Austin, TX.

== Benefits and services provided ==
- Medicaid for families and children
- Long-term care for people who are older or have disabilities
- SNAP (Supplemental Nutrition Assistance Program) food benefits and TANF (Temporary Assistance For Needy Families) cash assistance for families
- Behavior health services
- Services to help keep people who are older or who have disabilities in their homes or communities
- Services for women and people with special health needs

== Oversight of regulatory functions ==
- Licensing and credentialing of long-term care facilities, such as nursing homes and assisted living
- Licensing child care providers
- Managing the day-to-day operations of state supported living centers and state hospitals

== More information ==
Texas Department of State Health Services (DSHS)

Many of the direct client services that were performed by DSHS, such as services for women and children, and people with special health care needs, were transferred to HHSC in September 2016. DSHS now focuses on providing these functions:

- Vital statistics, such as birth and death records
- Compiling and disseminating health data on more than 25 topics
- Chronic and infectious disease prevention and laboratory testing
- Licensing and regulating facilities on topics from asbestos to mobile food establishments to youth camps

Texas Department of Aging and Disability Services (DADS)

The 84th Texas Legislature, 2015, abolished this agency effective Sept. 1, 2017. DADS services were transferred to HHSC.

Texas Department of Family and Protective Services (DFPS)

House Bill 5, 85th Regular Legislative Session, 2017, established DFPS as an agency independent of Texas Health and Human Services effective Sept. 1, 2017. To comply with previous legislation, on Sept. 1, 2017, HHSC assumed responsibility for the child care licensing function previously managed by DFPS.
