= COVID-19 pandemic in Texas =

Ongoing COVID-19 viral pandemic in Texas, United States

- Disease: COVID-19
- Pathogen: SARS-CoV-2
- Location: Texas, U.S.
- Index case: San Antonio (evacuee), Fort Bend County (non-evacuee)
- Arrival date: March 4, 2020
- Confirmed cases: 2,401,898
- Active cases: 95,027
- Hospitalized cases: 2,840 (current)
- Recovered: 2,646,788
- Deaths: 47,725

Government website
- www.dshs.texas.gov/coronavirus/

The COVID-19 pandemic in Texas is a part of the viral pandemic of coronavirus disease 2019 (COVID-19), a novel infectious disease caused by severe acute respiratory syndrome coronavirus 2 (SARS-CoV-2). The state of Texas confirmed its first case on February 13, 2020, among U.S. nationals evacuated from China to Joint Base San Antonio–Lackland beginning in early February; however, retrospective analyses have suggested a much earlier origin than previously thought. The first documented case of COVID-19 in Texas outside of evacuees at Lackland was confirmed on March 4 in Fort Bend County, and many of the state's largest cities recorded their first cases throughout March. The state recorded its first death associated with the disease on March 17 in Matagorda County.

As of April 3, 2021, Texas has the second-highest number of confirmed cases in the United States, behind California, and the 26th highest number of confirmed cases per capita. It has the third-highest number of deaths related to the virus, behind New York and California, and the 24th-highest count of deaths per capita.

Although Texas had a higher concentration of cases, it had fewer deaths. As of late May 2021, there were 50,198 COVID-19 related deaths reported in that state. The death rate in Texas was 175 for every 100,000 people, while national COVID-19 death rate was 179 per 100,000.

As of April 3, 2021, vaccination in Texas lagged behind the US average, with rates lower than in three of four neighboring states, having administered 12,565,129 COVID-19 vaccine doses, equivalent to 43,334 doses per-100,000 of the state's population.

== Timeline ==
The initial origin of community spread in Texas remains unclear, but numerous anecdotal accounts by those later confirmed have included onset dates as early as December 28, 2019, in Point Venture, and retrospective analyses have found unexplained statistical increases in deaths during this time. Testing capacity across the state remained extremely limited until after the first recorded cases were announced.

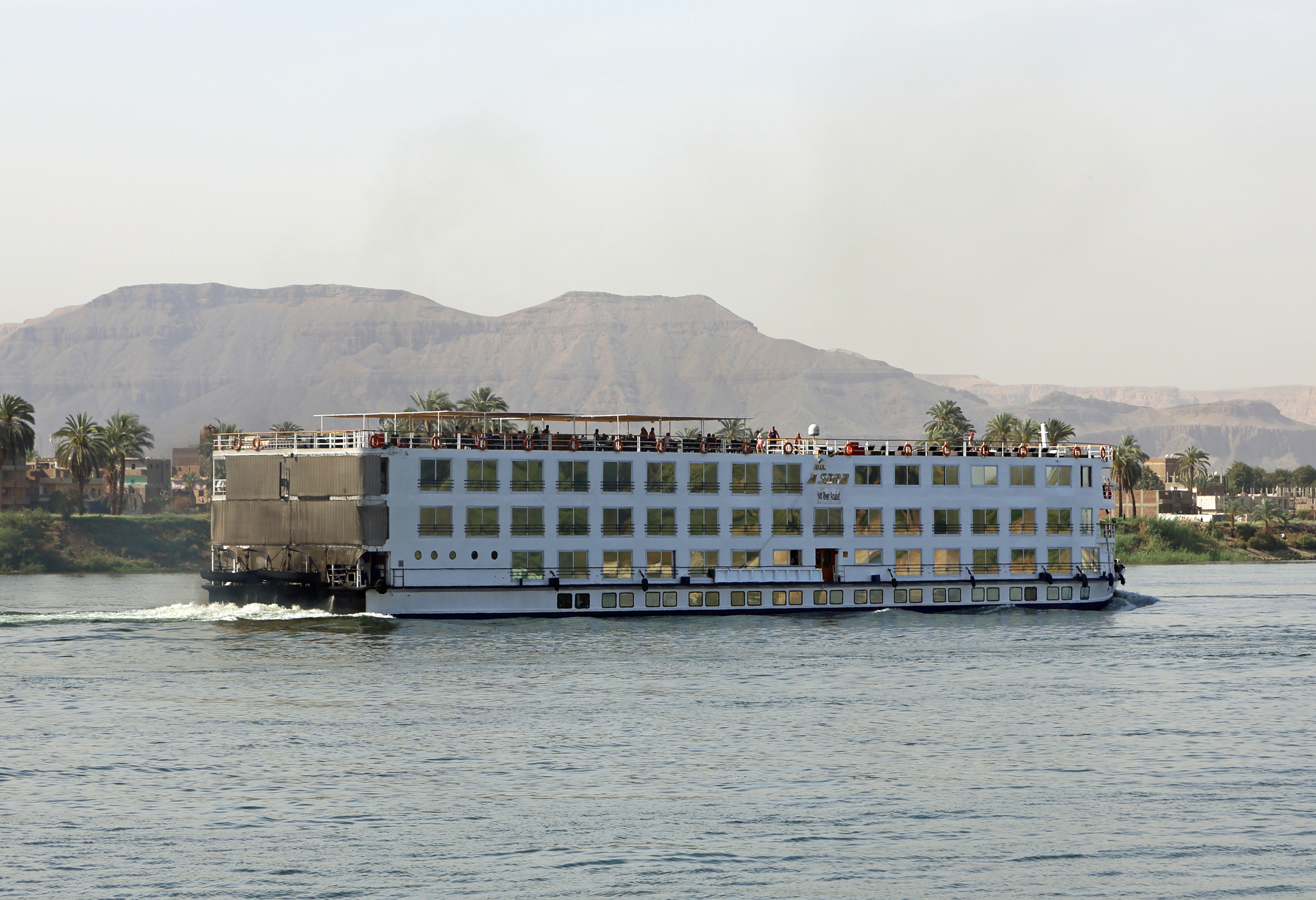
The first confirmed cases in Texas were associated with travelers on board the M.S. A'sara river cruise ship in Egypt

Research from Austin Public Health conducted in May 2020 found 68 COVID-19 patients in Central Texas who began reporting symptoms dating back to around the beginning of March. On March 2, San Antonio Mayor Nirenberg issued a public health emergency after an individual positive for the virus was mistakenly released from quarantine at JBSA–Lackland. Two days later, the Texas Department of State Health Services (DSHS) reported a presumptive positive test result for COVID-19 from a resident of Fort Bend County in the Houston area. A man in his 70s was the first known positive case of the disease in Texas outside of those evacuated from Wuhan and the Diamond Princess cruise ship. The patient had recently traveled to Egypt and was hospitalized.

On March 5, at least eight cumulative cases, including both positive and presumptive positive cases, were identified in the Houston area. All individuals with confirmed cases were part of a group that traveled to Egypt in February, including the first confirmed case in Fort Bend County. The travel group rode aboard the Nile River cruise ship MS A'sara. Additional individuals were also investigated as possible carriers in the Houston area in connection with the Egypt trip. The state announced six public health laboratories within its Laboratory Response Network capable of testing for COVID-19.

On March 8, JBSA–Lackland received approximately 100 evacuees from the cruise ship Grand Princess following a localized outbreak on board. Rice University became the first university in the state to enact significant cancellations, suspending in-person classes and undergraduate labs during the week in response to an employee testing positive in connection with the viral cluster that traveled to Egypt. The next day, the cumulative number of confirmed cases in Texas reported by the DSHS surpassed 10. That same day, a resident in his 30s of Frisco, a suburb of Dallas in Collin County, received a presumptive positive test for the virus, having recently traveled to Silicon Valley in California. He was the first case identified in the Dallas–Fort Worth metropolitan area.

On March 11, local health officials reported a positive test for COVID-19 in Montgomery County and identified as the first possible case of community spread—not directly related to travel or known contact with positive travelers—in Texas and in the Houston area. The patient's attendance of a barbecue at the Houston Livestock Show and Rodeo on February 28 was reported as a possible but unconfirmed source of the virus. The city of Houston ordered the Houston Livestock Show and Radio to close after announcing an emergency health declaration. Montgomery Independent School District in the Houston area and Alvarado Independent School District in the Dallas area were the first two public school districts in Texas to temporarily close classes over COVID-19, affecting approximately 12,400 students across 17 schools.

On March 13, Governor Abbott declared a state of disaster for all counties in Texas, invoking emergency powers for his administration, and ordered state employees to remote work. Day cares, nursing homes, and prisons were asked to limit visitations. The state's first mobile testing center for COVID-19 opened in San Antonio. Colleges and universities throughout the state extended spring breaks with some transitioning to online instruction, including Baylor University, the University of Houston, the University of North Texas, the University of Texas at Austin, Texas State University, and Texas Tech University. School districts also announced temporary suspensions of classes statewide.

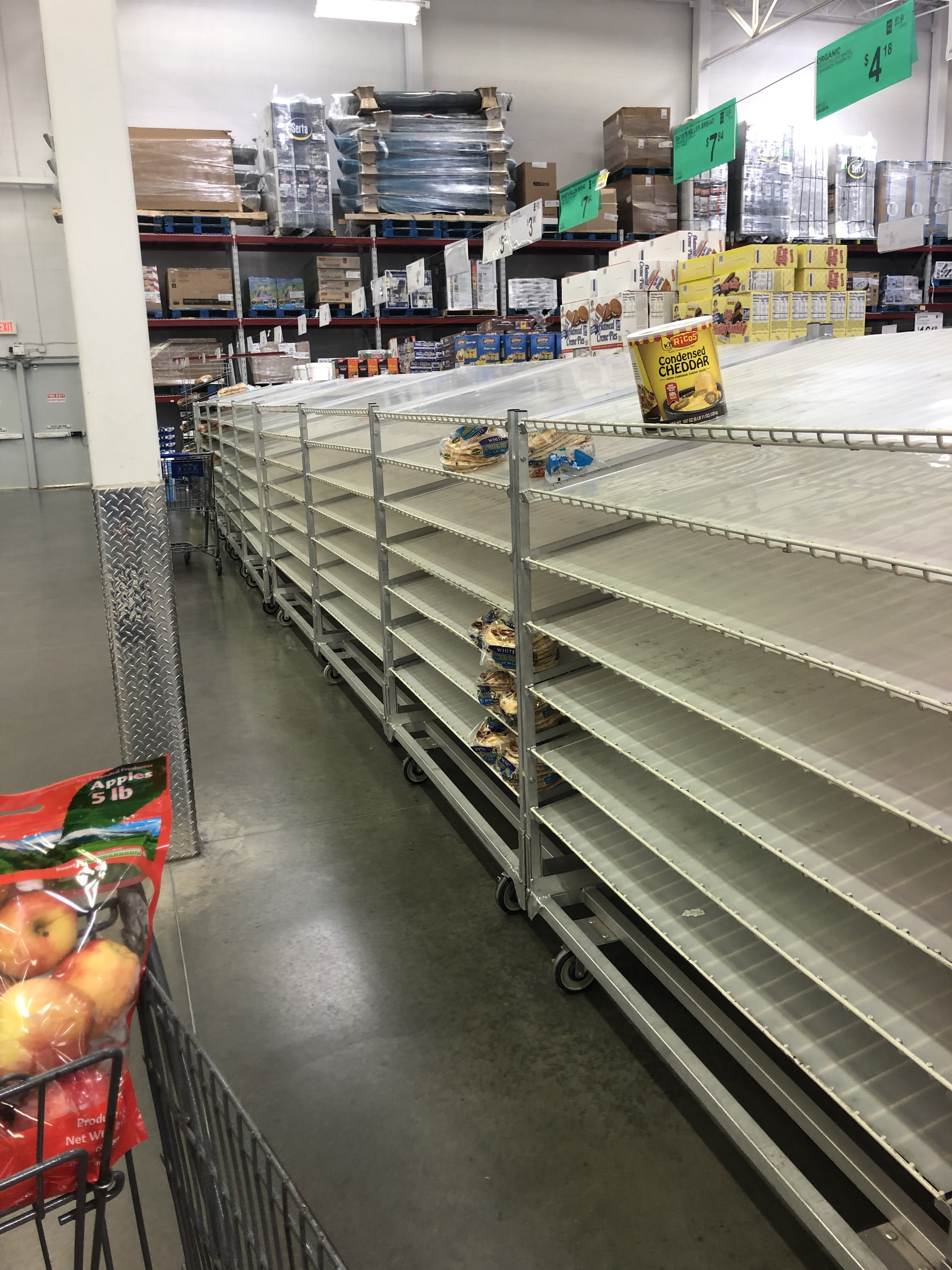
Empty shelves from panic buying at the Sam's Club in Lufkin on March 13, 2020

On March 17, DSHS reported that a man in his 90s in Matagorda County died of COVID-19 after being hospitalized, becoming the first official COVID-19 fatality in Texas. The Texas National Guard was activated, making Texas the 21st U.S. state to activate its National Guard; the security force was not yet deployed. Abbott granted waivers to hospitals to bolster unused bed capacity without applying or paying added fees. Abbott also asked the Small Business Administration to declare an Economic Injury Disaster Declaration for the state, with eligibility granted three days later.

On March 19, the cumulative number of confirmed cases in Texas reported by the DSHS surpassed 100. The DSHS declared a public health disaster, marking the first such declaration since 1901. Abbott issued four executive orders to ban gatherings of more than 10 people; discourage eating and drinking at bars, food courts restaurants, and visiting gyms (and close bars and restaurant dining rooms); proscribe visitation of nursing homes, retirement centers, and long-term care facilities with exception of providing critical care; and temporarily close all Texas schools.

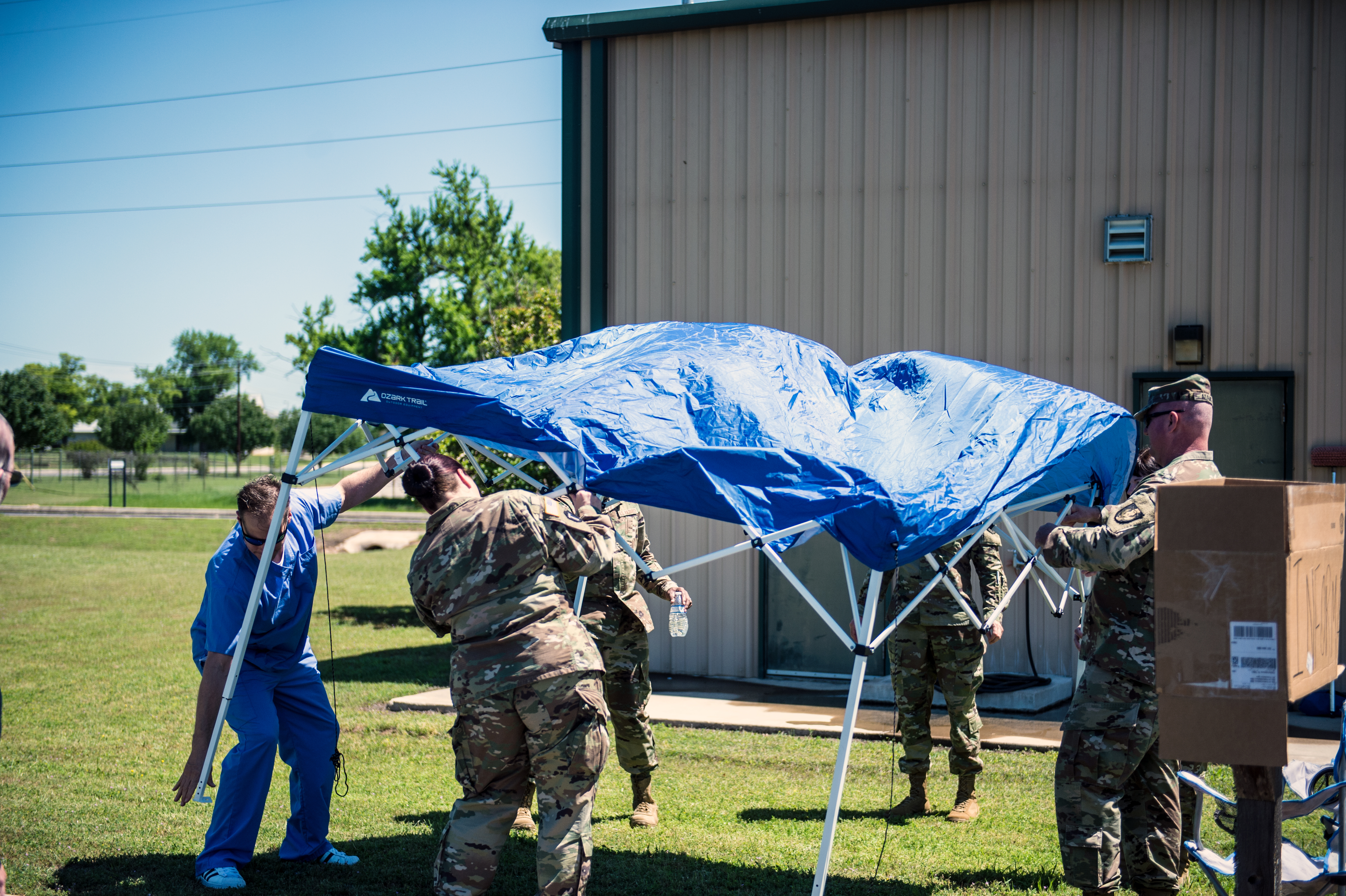
The Texas National Guard was deployed on March 27 to aid mobile COVID-19 testing

On March 26, the cumulative number of confirmed cases in Texas exceeded 1,000, and Abbott mandated visitors flying from Connecticut, New Jersey, New York, and New Orleans, Louisiana, to self-quarantine for 14 days. A team of researchers at the University of Texas at Austin projected that the healthcare capacity of Greater Austin would be exceeded if "extensive social distancing measures" were not implemented. Their findings indicadte that a 90 percent compliance scenario would maintain hospitalizations within capacity through August 17.

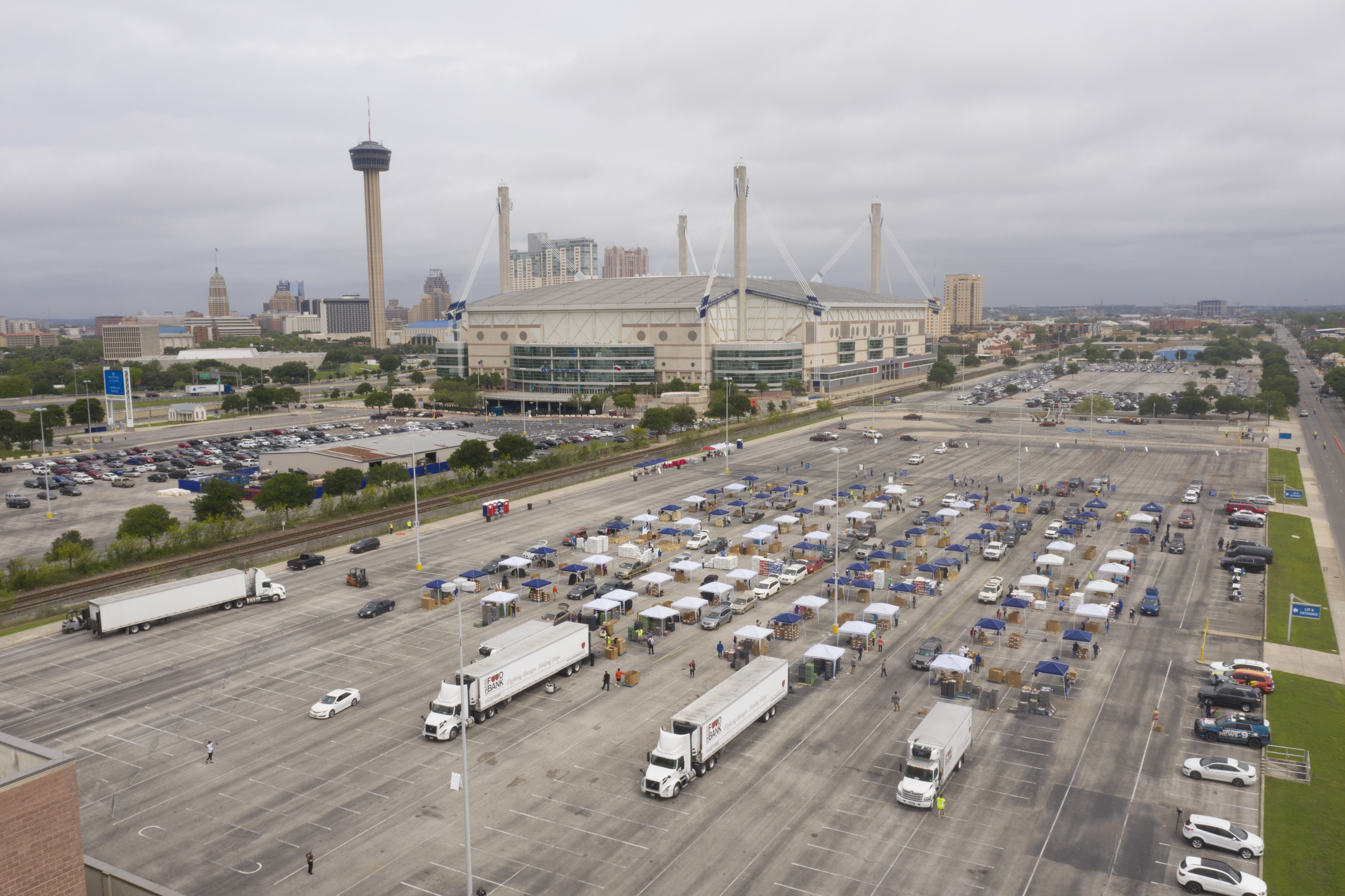
Mass distribution sites for food were established in Texas, including one at the Alamodome

On April 17, Abbott announced the start of his plan to reopen the Texas economy, citing a "semi-flattened curve" of COVID-19 cases in the state. The reopening was outlined in three executive orders allowing for state parks to open under social distancing regulations on April 20, limiting nonessential surgeries at hospitals beginning after April 21, and product pickup at retail stores beginning April 24. The reopening process also established the Strike Force to Open Texas, an advisory panel to Abbott for reopening economy. The panel was led by James Huffines with Mike Toomey as chief operating officer; its consulting members are all members of the Republican Party. The panel also consisted of a medical team and a special advisory council. Abbott also called for public schools to remain closed for the rest of the 2019–2020 academic year. Ten days later, pursuant to the executive order establishing the Strike Force to Open Texas, Abbott released the Texas Governor's Report to Open Texas, putting forth a phased approach to reopen the state's economy.

On May 5, Abbott modified his earlier reopening timetable, allowing barbershops, hairdressers, and nail salons to begin reopening on May 8 while maintaining social distancing. Gyms and exercise facilities were allowed to reopen beginning May 18 while operating at quarter occupancy. On May 18, Texas entered Phase 2 of the governor's reopening plan. On June 3, Texas enters Phase 3 of Abbott's reopening plan.

On June 23, the state reported more than 5,000 new cases of COVID-19 in a single day for the first time, documenting 5,489. Hospitalizations related to COVID-19 also reached a record high with 4,092. Abbott gave approval for mayors and county judges to enact restrictions on outdoor gatherings with more than 100 people, reducing the size limit from 500. Abbott also indicated that respirator enforcement was within the purview of local officials. Abbott ordered the HHSC to reinstate COVID-19 health and safety standards at child care centers, reversing the agency's lifting of those requirements on June 12. Two days later, a record-high number of new COVID-19 cases, 5,996, was set for the third consecutive day in Texas; the three days contribute over 17,000 cases to the cumulative case count. Abbott paused the reopening of the businesses in the state as hospitalizations deaths and new COVID-19 cases begin to quickly rise, though prior relaxations of COVID-19 restrictions remained in place.

On June 26, Abbott began rolling back some of the lifted restrictions from his earlier state reopening plan, issuing an executive order that promptly closed bars except for takeout and curbside pickup and closed rafting and tubing businesses in addition to restricting indoor dining at restaurants to 50 percent capacity. The order also required most outdoor gatherings with at least 100 people to seek approval by local governments. Harris County Judge Lina Hidalgo evaluated the county as having reached the highest threat level, indicating a "severe and uncontrolled level of COVID-19", and called for the reinstatement of a stay-at-home order for the county in addition to prohibiting outdoor gatherings with more than 100 people in unincorporated parts of the county.

On July 2, Abbott mandated the wearing of face coverings in public spaces, with fines for non-first time offenders. Counties with 20 or fewer active cases, children under 10, and persons with interfering medical conditions were allowed to opt-out of the order, as well as people attending church, voting at polling places, or exercising outdoors. Austin Mayor Adler issued an executive order restricting gatherings with more than 10 people outside of child-care services, religious gatherings, and recreational sports.

On August 11, 2020, Texas became the third state in the U.S. after California and Florida to exceed 500,000 in total number of reported cases. By October 29, 2020, larger hospitals in Amarillo, Lubbock, and El Paso did not have space available to accept transfers of seriously ill COVID patients from rural areas.

During the fifth wave of infections in August 2021, demand for ICU beds in at least 50 Texas hospitals reached or exceeded 100% of ICU capacity. A surge in hospitalizations among children caused Houston and Dallas to run out of pediatric ICU beds, with Houston resorting to an air lift evacuation in one case. On August 17, 2021, it was announced that Governor Abbott had tested positive for COVID-19. He had been fully vaccinated against COVID-19 and began taking Regeneron's monoclonal antibodies.

In January 2024, the Texas Department of State Health Services (DSHS) transitioned from standalone COVID-19 reporting to a combined "Texas Respiratory Virus Surveillance Report," which tracks COVID-19 alongside influenza and RSV.

On September 1, 2025, House Bill 4535 went into effect, establishing new requirements for COVID-19 vaccine administration in Texas. The law requires health care providers to obtain written informed consent and provide a state-specific vaccine information statement to patients prior to vaccination.

== Epidemiology ==
The first positive test result for COVID-19 in Texas, outside of the evacuees quarantined at JBSA–Lackland from China and the Diamond Princess cruise ship, was reported by the DSHS on March 4 and involved a resident of Fort Bend County. The patient was a man in his 70s and had traveled on the Nile River cruise ship MS A'sara in Egypt. A total of 12 positive test results were reported in Fort Bend and Harris counties from travelers aboard the same ship. The first case of possible community spread—where the source of infection is unknown—was reported by public health officials on March 11, involving a man in his 40s in Montgomery County; he had recently attended a barbecue at the Houston Livestock Show and Rodeo on February 28. The first death in Texas identified in connection with COVID-19 occurred on March 14 from a man in his 90s at the Matagorda Regional Medical Center; Matagorda County officials reported the death on March 15 and the DSHS confirmed it the following day. According to the DSHS, the state exceeded 100 total cases of COVID-19 by March 19 and 1,000 cases by March 26. By the end of March 2020, there were 3,266 known cases of COVID-19 and 41 fatalities in Texas, with nearly half of the state's counties reporting at least one case. An analysis of the first month of COVID-19's spread in Texas, published in the Journal of Community Health, found that while the total case counts were highest in the state's metropolitan areas, the highest incidence rates of the disease per capita occurred in Donley County, with 353.5 cases per 100,000 people. The case fatality rate (CFR) was 10.3 percent in Comal County; high CFR counties had "a higher proportion of non-Hispanic Black residents, adults aged 65 and older, and adults smoking, but lower number of ICU beds per 100,000 population, and number of primary care physicians per 1000 population."

The cumulative number of COVID-19 cases confirmed by the DSHS reached 10,000 on April 9 and 100,000 on June 19. The number of confirmed fatalities eclipsed 100 on April 4 and 1,000 on May 9. Counties that adopted shelter-in-place orders early showed a 19–26 percent decrease in COVID-19 case growth 2.5 weeks following the enactment of those orders according to an analysis published in the National Bureau of Economic Research. The same analysis found that such orders in urbanized counties accounted for 90 percent of attenuated case growth in the state by May. A surge in new COVID-19 cases began in June with large increases in the state's major cities and within a younger population compared to the beginning of the pandemic.

== Responses ==
=== State responses ===
The government of Texas did not have a coordinated, statewide response to the early stages of the COVID-19 pandemic, relying mostly on local policies. Governor Abbott declared a state of disaster on March 13, 2020, giving him powers to order state-wide public health measures, and prohibited large social gatherings and dine-in service at bars and restaurants on March 19. On March 31, Abbott issued an executive order requiring all residents to remain at their homes unless conducting essential activities, and to minimize gatherings with people from outside of their immediate household. Abbott specifically avoided use of terms such as "shelter-in-place" or "stay-at-home order", as he felt that they did not adequately reflect his goals. A suspension of elective medical procedures faced legal disputes for effectively prohibiting abortions.

In May 2020, Texas began to lift its initial restrictions via a phased timetable, via executive orders superseding all local health orders, the process was paused on June 25 due to a surge of cases, and Abbott rolled back some of the orders the next day, including reducing restaurant capacity to 50%, closing bars, and prohibiting unapproved gatherings of more than 100 people. On July 2, Abbott announced that the wearing of face masks would be mandated in enclosed public spaces in counties with a minimum number of cases, and gatherings of more than 10 people without government approval would be prohibited. On September 17, capacity limits for businesses were raised to 75%.

On March 2, 2021, as COVID-19 vaccines began to be administered throughout the country, Abbott announced the final phase of reopening. All remaining COVID-19 restrictions in Texas would be lifted effective March 10 via an executive order that supersedes all local orders. It only allowed the reinstatement of restrictions on businesses in counties where COVID hospitalizations accounted for more than 15% of their local bed capacity for at least seven days. However, business capacity could not be lowered below 50%. In addition, all mask mandates were lifted, and all jurisdictions are prohibited from enforcing mask mandates. Abbott stated that residents had " "mastered the daily habits to avoid getting COVID", and thus enforceable public health orders were no longer necessary. The action was considered premature by President Joe Biden and other health experts. The city of Austin continued to enforce its mask mandate, resulting in a threat of legal action by the Texas Attorney General. On March 26, District Judge Lora Livingston blocked a request by the AG for a temporary injunction against a retaliatory lawsuit filed by Austin, thus allowing the enforceable mandate to remain in force.

Following the lifting of all restrictions, the state government imposed further restrictions on COVID-19-related public health measures; in April, Abbott issued an executive order prohibiting state agencies from issuing "vaccine passports" or requiring proof of vaccination with COVID-19 vaccines that are currently administered pursuant to Emergency Use Authorization (EUA). In July, a bill was signed prohibiting private businesses from requesting proof of vaccination from their customers. Later that month, despite rising cases, Abbott strictly prohibited counties from imposing capacity restrictions on businesses, even if they have a large number of COVID-19-related hospitalizations. On August 26, the prohibition of proof of vaccination by state agencies was extended to any COVID-19 vaccine, even if approved by the FDA. In October 2021, Abbott issued Executive Order GA-40, which prohibits all entities in the state of Texas from "compel[ling] receipt" of a COVID-19 vaccine by any individual "who objects to such vaccination for any reason of personal conscience, based on a religious belief, or for medical reasons, including prior recovery from COVID-19."

=== Local responses ===
On March 2, San Antonio Mayor Ron Nirenberg and Bexar County both declared a "local state of disaster and a public health emergency" after an individual was mistakenly released from quarantine at Joint Base San Antonio by the CDC before a third test for coronavirus returned a positive result. The city subsequently petitioned the federal government to extend the quarantine of US nationals at Joint Base San Antonio; the petition was denied by Judge Xavier Rodriguez in the United States District Court for the Western District of Texas. Both the city of Dallas and Dallas County have declared a "local disaster of public health emergency".

Abbott left the decision to local governments to set stricter guidelines. Two hours later, Dallas County Judge Clay Jenkins ordered residents of Dallas County to shelter in place beginning 11:59 p.m. on the following day. A day later on March 23, Bell, Bexar, Brazos, Cameron, Hunt, McLennan, Stephens counties and the city of Forney, issued a shelter in place for their communities. Collin, Galveston, Harris, Travis, and Williamson counties issued same measures on March 24. However, Collin County had more relaxed guidelines for their shelter in place order. Collin County's order stated that all businesses are essential and would be allowed to remain open as long as they followed physical distancing guidelines.

In Austin, where the South by Southwest festival was closed, many bar owners on Sixth Street boarded their windows to protect the stock they had amassed in preparation for the cancelled event. A street art campaign decorated the boarded businesses with art capturing the mood of lockdown.

In mid-June 2020, some county officials requested that the governor grant them the power to fine individuals for not wearing a mask in public, as local governments were prohibited from doing so by the governor's order; the governor refused. Nelson Wolff, the Bexar County judge, found a loophole in the order, and on June 17 issued an order fining businesses for allowing in customers without a mask. Other counties and cities followed suit. In response, the governor said this had been the "plan all along", which some local officials doubted, and that the judge "finally figured that out". This angered some people in areas where people had been dying of COVID-19.

Nacogdoches County sheriff Jason Bridges announced he would not be enforcing the statewide mask order, because it was "borderline infringing on some ... constitutional rights", even though legal experts agree such measures are constitutional under the state's police power. Bridges said enforcing public health measures during the pandemic "is not something we have time to be doing", despite health experts' agreement that mask wearing reduces transmission significantly.

During a July 14 press conference, Houston Mayor Sylvester Turner along with Dr. David Persse and Houston Fire Department Chief Sam Pena announced that the Army medical task force arrived Monday July 13 to help ramp up the city's response to COVID-19 with plans to open more facilities as medical resorts. Over the weekend prior, Turner said he proposed a two-week shutdown to Abbott to help curb the soaring rates; Hidalgo, an early proponent of extending the shutdown, voiced support for another shut down. During a July 15 press conference, Turner announced 16 new COVID-19 related deaths as well as two new testing sites to handle the demand of residents seeking testing in response to the surging coronavirus cases, calling for a minimum 90 percent compliance from residents for the safety measures to be effective. In a July 15 press conference, Houston Mayor Sylvester Turner announced 16 new COVID-19 related deaths as well as two new testing sites to handle the demand of residents seeking testing in response to the surging coronavirus cases, calling for a minimum 90 percent compliance from residents for the safety measures to be effective.

On October 29, Texas Attorney General Ken Paxton challenged a two-week shutdown of nonessential businesses ordered by El Paso County Judge Ricardo Samaniego. El Paso had daily case counts of over 1,000 per day, and hospitals were overwhelmed, with 44% of patients under treatment for COVID-19.

==== Business and community responses ====
H-E-B, in January 2020, activated a comprehensive pandemic emergency management plan first conceived in 2009 in response to concerns over H1N1. Other essential businesses collectively began limiting operational hours, providing previously in-store experiences in palatable to-go forms, restricting points of entry, and requiring use of sanitizer or face masks for all customers. Many restaurants began offering pre-prepared ingredients to recreate their experiences at home, and a resurgence of drive-in theaters was seen particularly in the Greater Austin and Greater San Antonio areas.

== Economic and social impact ==
=== Crime ===
A survey conducted by KPRC-TV found an increase in homicide and car theft. In Houston the murder rate went up 39%. Law enforcement officials report a rise in fraud and identity theft as well and say they have been receiving more phone calls for assault, domestic violence, mental health related complaints and drug use. Police and psychologists have attributed the rise in crime to changes in behavior brought on by the extreme stress and anxiety of the pandemic. Some police officers blame bond reform too likening it to a "catch and release system". Police reported increased cooperation on investigating groups of individuals who travel from city to city committing robberies and other property crimes. Some jurisdictions have seen more cases of purse snatchings and people being followed from ATMs.

=== Effect on businesses ===
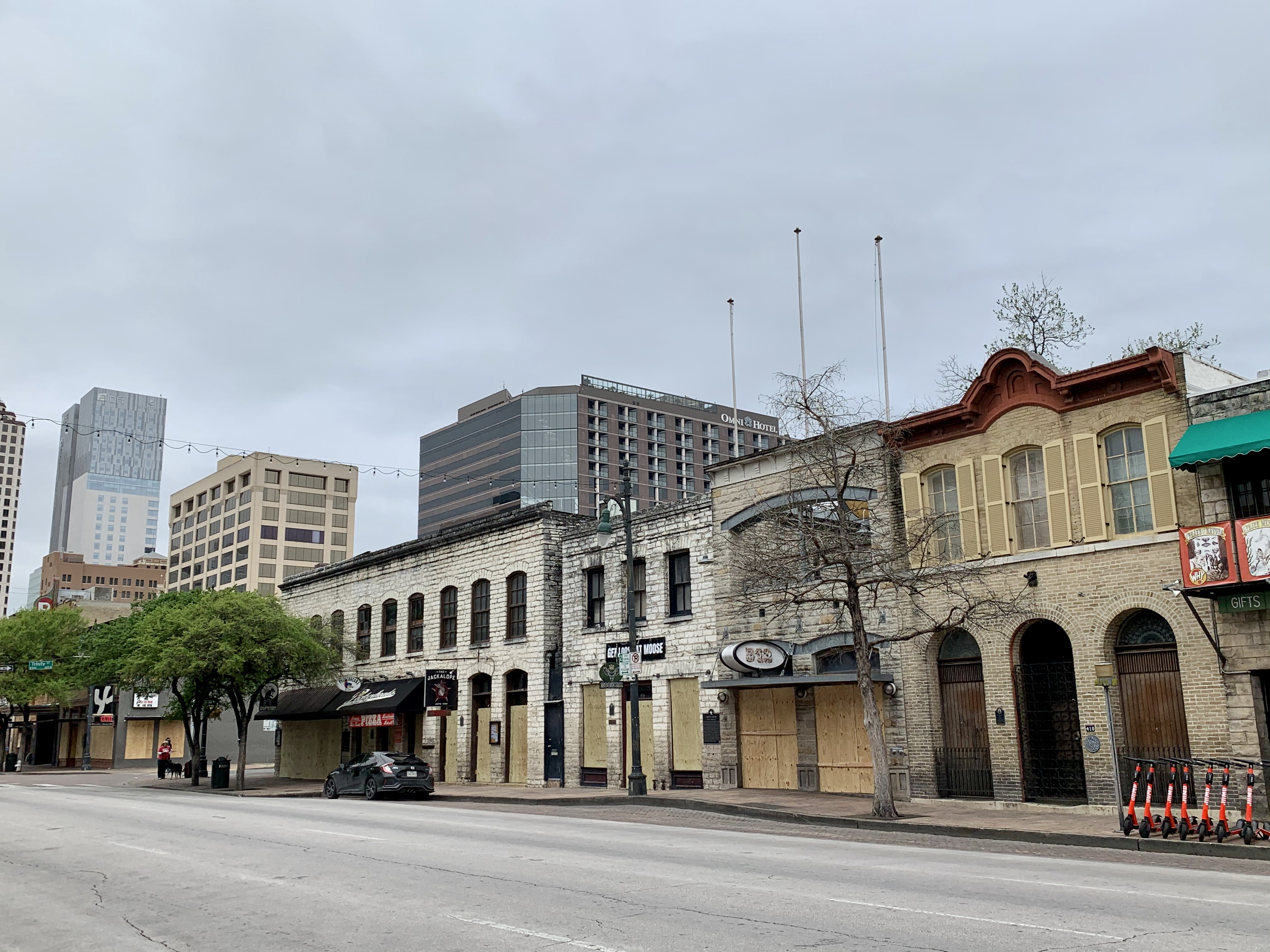
Sixth Street in Austin after all bars and restaurants were ordered closed

On March 13, Six Flags (based in Texas) suspended operations to all twelve of their properties nationwide as well as in Mexico, that were operating in the month of March, until the end of the month; these include the two Texas parks, Six Flags Fiesta Texas and Six Flags Over Texas. On March 30, the closure was extended to all of their properties. Sea World San Antonio announced plans to close from March 16 to April 1, along with all Schlitterbahn waterparks, the parks have delayed the closure. Both Schlitterbahn waterparks announced they'd be the first major water park in the state to reopen in mid-June. The two Texas Six Flags parks will reopen the parks on June 19.

On March 14, H-E-B announced that all of their stores across the state will reduce open hours, to help restock items. This also includes their pharmacies and Central Market locations. The announcement comes a day after the company announced that its Houston area stores would be the only locations to implement changes to their operations. A month later, H-E-B expanded their store hours across the state (closer to normal store hours), as supply availability has improved.

As of May 26, KVUE reported that "The Texas Restaurant Association estimates that 6% of restaurants in Austin have shut down for good during the pandemic, and that number is estimated to be at 12% statewide". A number of these restaurants that closed had been famous and well-established in the state for decades. Some notable ones include Highland Park Cafeteria, a Dallas restaurant that had served comfort food for 95 years, and Threadgill's, an 81-year old tavern that was the first post-Prohibition Austin business with a beer license before becoming a restaurant in 1981 (Janis Joplin started her music career here).

Abbott's plans to lift the stay-at-home order and reopen Texas was followed by a spike in coronavirus cases reaching 50,000 new cases by Memorial Day weekend. The number rose consistently pushing Texas to chart at the top of cases nationwide and hospitals in the state's largest cities reaching near or full ICU capacity. In response to the resurgence of COVID-19 cases, Abbott issued an executive order shutting down bars for a second time since the beginning of the pandemic. Several Texas bar owners filed a $10 million federal lawsuit stating that Abbott's order violates their constitutional rights; the order impacted restaurants with high alcohol sales as well, with the Texas Restaurant Association estimating that at least 1,500 restaurants that serve alcohol were forced to close, which displaced more than 35,000 employees.

=== Event cancellations ===
For the first time in the event's history, South by Southwest was cancelled as a result of local health concerns about the coronavirus pandemic. The Houston Livestock Show and Rodeo cancelled the rest of the event on March 11, that was slated to run until March 22. It was confirmed that a resident from Montgomery County, Texas that was tested positive, attended the BBQ cook off at the rodeo on February 28. The attendance for the rodeo on February 28, was 77,632, with 73,433 of the visitors went to the "World Championship Barb-B-Que Contest," where that person attended. The FIRST Championship, slated to occur in Houston around mid-April, was canceled due to the Coronavirus, along with all the other FIRST competitions in Texas.

After the announcement of the ban of gatherings of over 500 people on March 13 (in San Antonio), Fiesta San Antonio postponed their event to November 2020, that was originally slated for mid-April and eventually cancelled to April 2021, and then later pushed to June 2021.

Austin City Limits Music Festival, originally scheduled for October 2020, was cancelled on July 1; its organizers describing the cancellation as "the only responsible solution."

=== Impact on education ===
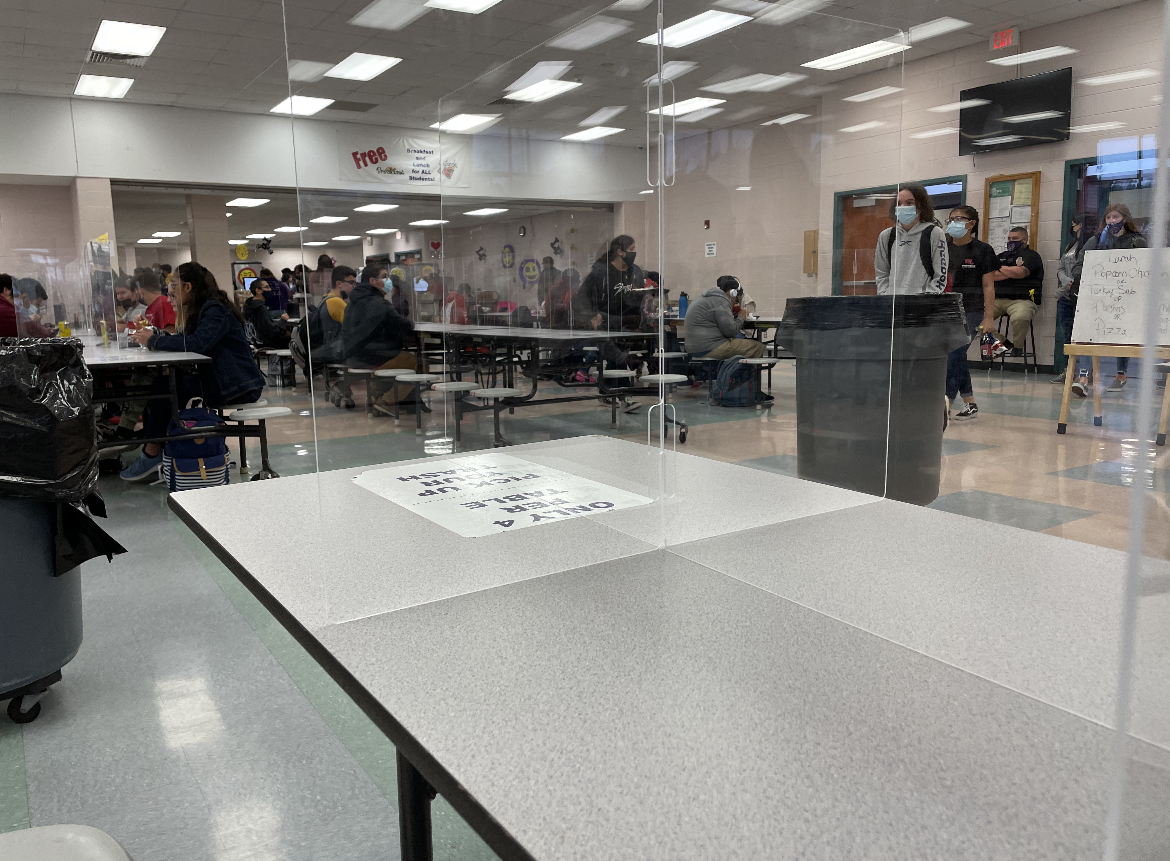
Measures such as mandatory masking, social distancing, and plastic dividers taken at a Texas public school to prevent the spread of COVID-19 in January 2021.

Among the closures of school districts and universities across the state, Abbott waived all State of Texas Assessments of Academic Readiness (STAAR) testing for the 2019–20 school year for public grade schools on March 16.

On March 19, Abbott issued an executive order that closed schools statewide until at least April 3. On March 31, the Governor announced that schools in the state will continue to stay closed until May 4. On April 17, Abbott said that Texas public schools would be closed for the remainder of the 2019–20 school year and that schools will continue to offer distance learning.

As of July 16, the state had still not established concrete rules for school reopenings in the Fall, but the latest word from Abbott on July 14 was that districts can expect more flexibility on opening classrooms, with state education officials agreeing to continue to fund school districts who choose to stay virtual if mandated by local health officials.

==== K-12 schools ====
Houston Independent School District, the state's largest school district, was among dozens of school districts extending their spring break, to help prevent the spread of the coronavirus. The closures were not without precedent, as many schools closed for two weeks during the 2009 H1N1 flu when Houston experienced a major outbreak. The CDC issued guidelines for K-12 school administrators to help "protect the health, safety, and wellbeing of students, teachers, other school staff, their families, and communities" as they prepare to return to school in fall 2020.

In August 2023, the Runge Independent School District temporarily closed its schools due to 10 reported COVID-19 cases among its staff members.

==== Universities ====
As of May 19, University of Texas at Austin disclosed that they were rolling out a series of "financial mitigation measures" to alleviate employee furloughs and other economic distress from COVID-19, even after receiving government grants. On May 20, it was announced that UT-Austin would open the campus for the Fall semester of 2020, but would conduct all classes and tests remotely after Thanksgiving break. They later announced on June 3 that classrooms would be kept at 40 percent capacity, and that around 2,100 classes (about a fifth of all available classes) will be conducted online during the fall. On June 8, both UT-Austin and Texas A&M University announced that wearing masks will be required when inside campus buildings during the Fall 2020 semester. On June 23, UT Austin announced that it was waiving SAT and ACT testing requirements for high school students who applied for fall 2021 undergraduate admission to ensure that COVID-19 did not affect a student's ability to apply to the university.

=== Sports ===
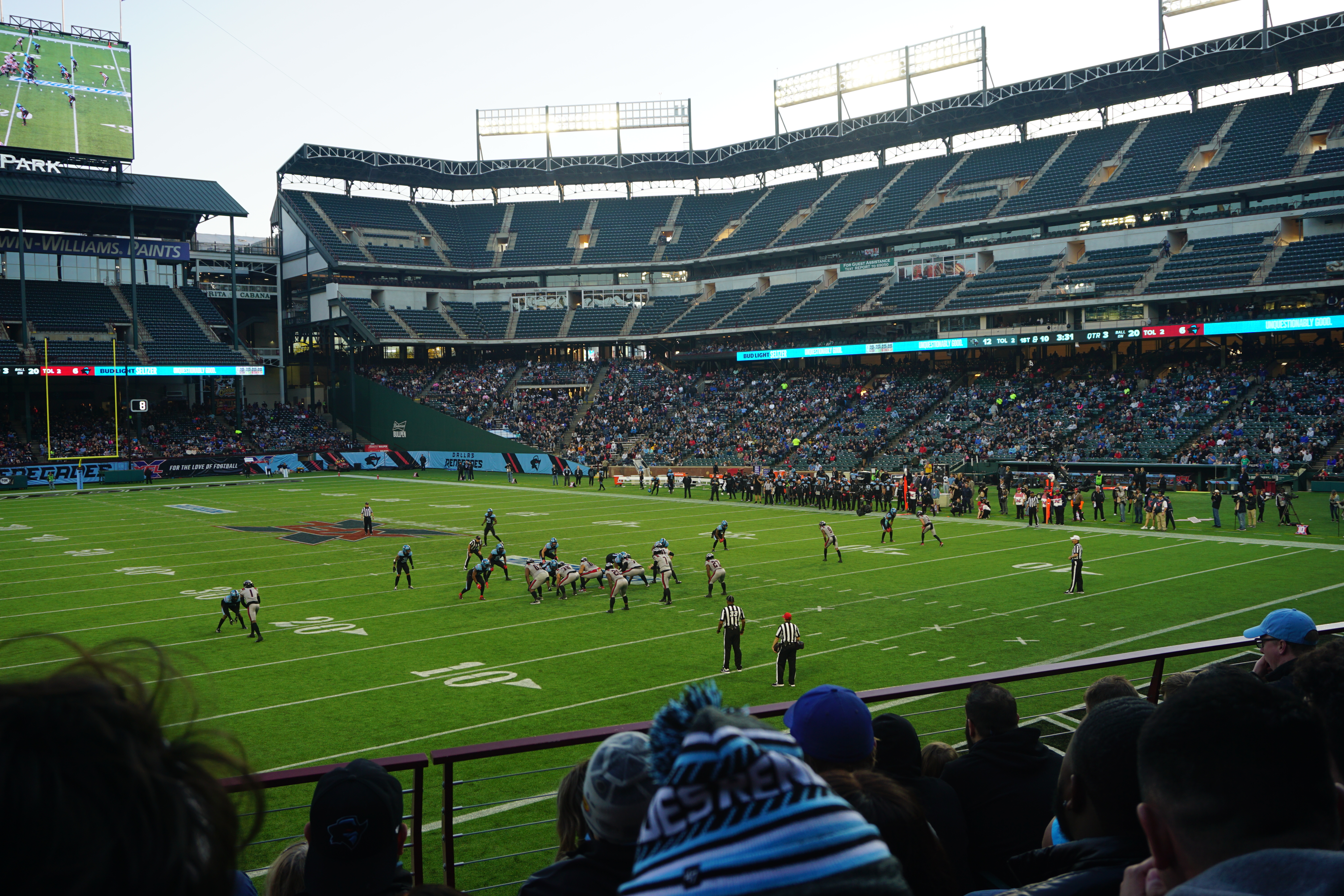
A Dallas Renegades XFL game at Globe Life Park in Arlington on March 7, 2020; this was their final game before the league's suspension and demise.

All major professional sports leagues in Texas suspended play, including the NBA (Dallas Mavericks, Houston Rockets and San Antonio Spurs) NHL (Dallas Stars), Major League Baseball (Texas Rangers and Houston Astros), and Major League Soccer (Houston Dynamo and FC Dallas). The XFL (Dallas Renegades and Houston Roughnecks) suspended play, and later filed for bankruptcy part-way into the rebooted league's inaugural season. In April 2020, the University Interscholastic League (UIL) cancelled all spring high school sports state-wide.

On May 28, Governor Abbott announced that professional sporting events at outdoor venues would be allowed to admit a limited number of spectators, capped at 25% of normal capacity, and subject to approval by health authorities. In June 2020, Fort Worth hosted the first IndyCar Series and PGA Tour events held since pandemic-related restrictions took effect, the Genesys 300 at Texas Motor Speedway, and the Charles Schwab Challenge at Colonial Country Club. Both events were held without spectators.

The pandemic impacted sports across the state at all levels: Texas high school started voluntary summer workouts on June 8 in anticipation of a full season return, but the UIL recommended all workouts statewide be postponed from July 3–13 as a safety measure, impacting around 200 schools across the state, many of which had already made the decision to shut down independently ahead of official orders. Professional teams such as the Houston Rockets were further impacted as players tested positive for COVID-19. On July 21, the UIL announced its plan to resume fall sports, splitting them into two categories: football and volleyball practices would begin first with 1A through 4A schools on August 3, schools with 5A and 6A designations would resume practices on September 7, with state football championships held in January.

To reduce travel and the impact of outbreaks, Major League Baseball scheduled its 2020 playoffs at neutral sites in Texas and California; Minute Maid Park in Houston and newly opened Globe Life Field in Arlington would host National League Division Series games during the postseason, while the 2020 National League Championship Series and 2020 World Series would be hosted entirely in Arlington (marking the first World Series to be held at a single ballpark since 1944). The NLCS and World Series would also be the first MLB games that season to admit spectators, capped at a capacity of 11,500 out of around 40,000. Citing looser restrictions in comparison to its traditional home of Las Vegas, the National Finals Rodeo also relocated to Globe Life Field.

To take advantage of the loosened restrictions, the Texas Rangers announced that they would not cap their capacity for their home opener against the Toronto Blue Jays on April 5. The team did not limit capacity for a pre-season exhibition series against the Milwaukee Brewers either, although they only attracted 12,911 and 10,859 spectators respectively. The official attendance for the home opener was 38,238, nearly 95% capacity.

=== Corrections ===
In November 2020 the University of Texas at Austin concluded that from March to October, 231 prisoners in the state died due to COVID-19. Due to the delay in announcing whether someone died from the disease, which can take as long as several months, Vox reported that "The 231 figure is likely to be a conservative count."

Based on an early 190 deaths count, UT Austin issued a report stating that the death rate of people in correctional supervision in Texas was 135% the general death rate.

The Texas Department of Criminal Justice (TDCJ) banned prisoner visitation on March 12, 2020, and resumed it on March 15, 2021. The agency vaccinated prison staff but as of February 2021 the prisoners did not yet receive them.

By the 2025–2026 respiratory season, COVID-19 vaccination in Texas shifted toward a seasonal model, with the DSHS encouraging annual shots alongside the flu vaccine. As of January 2026, health officials reported a general decline in emergency department visits for respiratory illnesses statewide.

== Statistics ==
COVID-19 pandemic medical cases in Texas by county
County (Note: County where individuals with a positive case reside. Location of diagnosis and treatment may vary.)	Confirmed Cases (Note: Reported confirmed and probable cases. Actual case numbers are probably higher.) (Note: Includes 96,588 cases from unknown counties.)	Probable Cases (Note: Includes 14,277 cases from unknown counties.)	Total Cases	Deaths (Note: Includes 36 deaths from unknown counties.)	Vaccine (Note: Includes 372,020 nonresidents or persons from unknown counties.)	Population (Note: July 2019 population estimate from "2019_txpopest_county.csv". Texas Demographic Center.)	Total Cases / 100k
254 / 254	6,677,164	1,831,040	8,508,204	92,378	18,206,131	29,001,602	29,337.0
Anderson	9,090	2,299	11,389	258	24,776	59,025	19,295.2
Andrews	2,701	1,798	4,499	75	8,366	19,279	23,336.3
Angelina	10,525	3,056	13,581	507	40,498	90,989	14,926.0
Aransas	4,234	1,543	5,777	98	14,327	23,710	24,365.2
Archer	2,309	327	2,636	31	4,235	9,228	28,565.2
Armstrong	398	252	650	10	727	2,001	32,483.8
Atascosa	12,266	3,195	15,461	241	26,017	50,898	30,376.4
Austin	5,577	1,636	7,213	84	15,048	32,067	22,493.5
Bailey	1,037	704	1,741	40	2,723	7,113	24,476.3
Bandera	2,972	1,254	4,226	81	10,399	23,129	18,271.4
Bastrop	18,954	7,279	26,233	256	52,553	89,564	29,289.7
Baylor	386	524	910	33	1,476	3,751	24,260.2
Bee	7,702	2,778	10,480	156	16,815	33,471	31,310.7
Bell	70,902	18,858	89,760	948	163,770	359,255	24,985.0
Bexar	569,701	140,226	709,927	6,550	1,332,284	1,997,417	35,542.3
Blanco	1,905	1,384	3,289	37	6,296	12,159	27,049.9
Borden	88	29	117	2	201	680	17,205.9
Bosque	3,083	1,580	4,663	78	8,636	19,062	24,462.3
Bowie	13,447	10,911	24,358	458	34,101	96,380	25,272.9
Brazoria	99,414	20,268	119,682	1,046	225,677	380,439	31,458.9
Brazos	69,706	8,439	78,145	439	120,850	230,789	33,859.9
Brewster	1,198	326	1,524	34	5,160	9,092	16,762.0
Briscoe	436	134	570	8	641	1,572	36,259.5
Brooks	1,405	809	2,214	55	7,326	7,115	31,117.4
Brown	7,103	8,896	15,999	240	16,131	38,993	41,030.4
Burleson	4,387	1,317	5,704	68	9,030	18,373	31,045.6
Burnet	10,628	2,665	13,293	182	26,188	48,716	27,286.7
Caldwell	14,568	2,647	17,215	187	24,898	43,199	39,850.5
Calhoun	4,511	2,565	7,076	55	11,533	22,028	32,122.8
Callahan	1,685	1,874	3,559	80	5,347	14,070	25,295.0
Cameron	94,870	38,028	132,898	2,133	353,438	426,210	31,181.3
Camp	2,058	1,526	3,584	80	5,698	12,914	27,752.8
Carson	1,002	555	1,557	38	2,102	5,951	26,163.7
Cass	5,663	3,389	9,052	206	10,607	30,451	29,726.4
Castro	2,208	524	2,732	49	3,277	7,380	37,019.0
Chambers	10,227	3,126	13,353	74	22,126	44,298	30,143.6
Cherokee	5,166	4,082	9,248	261	21,783	53,539	17,273.4
Childress	2,984	227	3,211	35	3,710	7,038	45,623.8
Clay	2,135	372	2,507	44	4,495	10,351	24,219.9
Cochran	709	281	990	25	1,115	2,904	34,090.9
Coke	466	691	1,157	21	1,305	3,390	34,129.8
Coleman	1,299	751	2,050	77	3,133	8,191	25,027.5
Collin	196,703	85,176	281,879	1,635	717,594	1,033,046	27,286.2
Collingsworth	546	374	920	17	975	2,853	32,246.8
Colorado	3,582	1,067	4,649	68	11,460	22,283	20,863.4
Comal	30,396	16,742	47,138	587	98,076	156,317	30,155.4
Comanche	2,784	1,453	4,237	85	6,263	13,878	30,530.3
Concho	633	711	1,344	14	1,396	2,716	49,484.5
Cooke	6,556	1,915	8,471	147	16,022	40,477	20,927.9
Coryell	17,012	4,414	21,426	235	33,076	75,137	28,515.9
Cottle	344	54	398	9	518	1,354	29,394.4
Crane	542	1,144	1,686	25	1,765	4,678	36,041.0
Crockett	299	1,270	1,569	21	1,637	3,461	45,333.7
Crosby	1,105	995	2,100	46	2,590	5,702	36,829.2
Culberson	536	43	579	14	1,164	2,211	26,187.2
Dallam	1,502	567	2,069	45	3,125	7,053	29,335.0
Dallas	577,772	118,809	696,581	7,173	1,608,328	2,647,576	26,310.1
Dawson	1,564	1,903	3,467	102	4,482	12,720	27,256.3
Deaf Smith	4,374	1,916	6,290	119	8,044	19,572	32,137.7
Delta	6,931	2,990	9,921	28	1,825	5,295	187,365.4
Denton	207,788	62,531	270,319	1,461	561,167	886,563	30,490.7
DeWitt	4,459	715	5,174	116	9,380	20,611	25,103.1
Dickens	242	263	505	16	724	2,119	23,832.0
Dimmit	5,166	1,080	6,246	52	7,551	9,709	64,332.1
Donley	493	786	1,279	26	1,215	3,228	39,622.1
Duval	3,169	1,279	4,448	74	7,387	10,907	40,781.1
Eastland	2,390	1,039	3,429	120	6,716	18,307	18,730.5
Ector	25,156	21,319	46,475	740	71,818	167,383	27,765.7
Edwards	368	197	565	12	789	1,959	28,841.2
El Paso	217,845	28,772	246,617	3,921	663,923	852,224	28,938.0
Ellis	44,146	13,912	58,058	620	101,497	188,464	30,805.9
Erath	6,723	3,242	9,965	132	16,221	43,042	23,151.8
Falls	3,560	782	4,342	72	8,199	17,401	24,952.6
Fannin	4,926	3,303	8,229	194	15,038	36,230	22,713.2
Fayette	3,478	1,853	5,331	119	13,341	26,328	20,248.4
Fisher	534	176	710	28	1,411	3,859	18,398.5
Floyd	1,328	874	2,202	50	2,544	5,535	39,783.2
Foard	183	55	238	12	519	1,139	20,895.5
Fort Bend	216,337	39,671	256,008	1,260	602,229	805,788	31,771.1
Franklin	1,655	1,018	2,673	46	4,067	10,791	24,770.6
Freestone	2,333	1,764	4,097	88	8,091	20,621	19,868.1
Frio	6,358	1,624	7,982	95	14,437	19,103	41,784.0
Gaines	1,018	739	1,757	85	4,723	21,170	8,299.5
Galveston	106,366	10,341	116,707	910	211,456	339,931	34,332.6
Garza	649	726	1,375	31	3,239	6,115	22,485.7
Gillespie	3,632	2,609	6,241	120	15,004	27,375	22,798.2
Glasscock	97	150	247	3	618	1,369	18,042.4
Goliad	1,341	430	1,771	34	3,354	8,007	22,118.1
Gonzales	3,625	1,660	5,285	107	10,912	20,769	25,446.6
Gray	4,062	2,727	6,789	134	8,867	21,930	30,957.6
Grayson	24,536	7,756	32,292	688	60,937	135,612	23,812.1
Gregg	12,812	9,824	22,636	730	59,374	126,116	17,948.6
Grimes	8,115	1,442	9,557	129	16,391	29,466	32,434.0
Guadalupe	30,041	15,106	45,147	433	94,142	166,961	27,040.4
Hale	5,703	1,686	7,389	251	14,479	33,165	22,279.5
Hall	958	268	1,226	24	1,260	3,017	40,636.4
Hamilton	1,708	375	2,083	36	4,286	8,641	24,106.0
Hansford	730	1,525	2,255	33	2,248	5,327	42,331.5
Hardeman	580	65	645	23	1,801	3,856	16,727.2
Hardin	7,585	7,762	15,347	262	22,263	59,178	25,933.6
Harris	1,171,407	148,960	1,320,367	11,691	3,044,041	4,698,655	28,101.0
Harrison	7,403	8,359	15,762	239	26,979	68,559	22,990.4
Hartley	877	411	1,288	3	2,686	5,861	21,975.8
Haskell	547	601	1,148	41	2,188	5,628	20,398.0
Hays	68,832	9,314	78,146	478	150,316	228,364	34,219.9
Hemphill	1,215	222	1,437	10	1,647	3,838	37,441.4
Henderson	13,992	3,836	17,828	448	33,991	82,989	21,482.4
Hidalgo	180,525	89,139	269,664	3,702	732,628	886,294	30,426.0
Hill	6,652	2,812	9,464	207	15,313	37,069	25,530.8
Hockley	7,415	1,409	8,824	169	10,137	22,862	38,596.8
Hood	9,862	5,076	14,938	302	30,501	60,984	24,494.9
Hopkins	5,541	3,158	8,699	193	15,164	37,312	23,314.2
Houston	2,455	2,458	4,913	121	9,876	23,381	21,012.8
Howard	4,205	4,166	8,371	196	12,795	36,294	23,064.4
Hudspeth	1,141	236	1,377	18	3,643	3,680	37,418.5
Hunt	13,841	6,476	20,317	379	43,121	97,842	20,765.1
Hutchinson	5,315	1,490	6,805	149	7,429	20,550	33,114.4
Irion	301	329	630	3	673	1,592	39,572.9
Jack	1,485	212	1,697	32	3,624	9,265	18,316.2
Jackson	2,992	916	3,908	64	6,751	14,561	26,838.8
Jasper	5,647	3,751	9,398	202	13,502	35,726	26,305.8
Jeff Davis	214	65	279	10	1,195	2,411	11,572.0
Jefferson	56,563	8,773	65,336	882	127,337	251,590	25,969.2
Jim Hogg	826	2,981	3,807	23	3,146	5,092	74,764.3
Jim Wells	10,181	4,427	14,608	226	23,320	40,204	36,334.7
Johnson	40,107	12,874	52,981	792	82,705	174,777	30,313.5
Jones	4,088	2,113	6,201	97	8,802	19,697	31,482.0
Karnes	5,462	1,082	6,544	75	8,820	15,508	42,197.6
Kaufman	32,735	9,749	42,484	563	73,775	135,410	31,374.3
Kendall	5,897	4,106	10,003	135	30,344	47,284	21,155.1
Kenedy	57	48	105	2	216	390	26,923.1
Kent	84	144	228	4	289	759	30,039.5
Kerr	4,895	5,907	10,802	206	26,095	52,829	20,447.1
Kimble	502	493	995	16	1,860	4,604	21,611.6
King	39	21	60	0	48	274	21,897.8
Kinney	649	125	774	14	1,879	3,575	21,650.3
Kleberg	5,956	3,698	9,654	155	19,346	32,135	30,042.0
Knox	354	274	628	25	1,441	3,683	17,051.3
La Salle	1,816	719	2,535	50	4,833	7,426	34,136.8
Lamar	4,309	7,156	11,465	282	19,678	50,440	22,730.0
Lamb	3,500	1,249	4,749	128	5,599	12,565	37,795.5
Lampasas	5,024	923	5,947	97	10,175	21,326	27,886.1
Lavaca	2,931	2,155	5,086	124	9,197	20,437	24,886.2
Lee	2,445	2,741	5,186	65	8,230	17,411	29,785.8
Leon	2,736	1,209	3,945	95	6,998	17,588	22,430.1
Liberty	17,265	6,076	23,341	420	40,850	91,098	25,621.9
Limestone	3,937	1,863	5,800	137	9,397	23,709	24,463.3
Lipscomb	571	204	775	17	957	3,208	24,158.4
Live Oak	1,621	772	2,393	43	4,163	12,164	19,672.8
Llano	3,197	1,748	4,945	102	11,610	21,784	22,700.1
Loving	116	294	410	1	32	96	427,083.3
Lubbock	66,920	47,708	114,628	1,402	152,050	308,880	37,110.9
Lynn	1,240	467	1,707	41	2,379	6,151	27,751.6
Madison	2,795	1,153	3,948	59	6,377	14,188	27,826.3
Marion	1,109	958	2,067	62	4,120	9,760	21,178.3
Martin	888	523	1,411	26	1,779	5,731	24,620.5
Mason	379	744	1,123	13	2,168	4,301	26,110.2
Matagorda	8,460	2,153	10,613	185	17,640	36,292	29,243.4
Maverick	23,031	2,414	25,445	481	57,557	57,888	43,955.6
McCulloch	910	1,124	2,034	52	3,152	8,323	24,438.3
McLennan	50,627	23,342	73,969	976	134,900	255,400	28,962.0
McMullen	156	44	200	10	331	749	26,702.3
Medina	8,412	4,135	12,547	213	28,588	53,794	23,324.2
Menard	283	383	666	13	1,132	2,128	31,297.0
Midland	22,125	26,637	48,762	520	76,735	176,814	27,578.1
Milam	3,653	2,568	6,221	109	11,602	25,185	24,701.2
Mills	1,131	387	1,518	40	2,147	4,899	30,985.9
Mitchell	1,914	242	2,156	52	3,162	8,531	25,272.5
Montague	4,492	838	5,330	136	7,200	19,695	27,062.7
Montgomery	129,646	43,374	173,020	1,394	354,116	604,391	28,627.2
Moore	3,817	2,176	5,993	116	9,756	21,046	28,475.7
Morris	1,848	1,159	3,007	76	5,631	12,428	24,195.4
Motley	141	159	300	13	341	1,205	24,896.3
Nacogdoches	10,546	4,559	15,105	280	29,974	65,027	23,228.8
Navarro	7,137	7,793	14,930	234	23,881	52,013	28,704.4
Newton	1,254	750	2,004	64	3,384	13,317	15,048.4
Nolan	2,368	626	2,994	108	6,485	14,256	21,001.7
Nueces	73,478	27,556	101,034	1,360	212,457	363,049	27,829.3
Ochiltree	2,219	419	2,638	50	3,802	10,219	25,814.7
Oldham	302	314	616	6	764	2,126	28,974.6
Orange	9,010	9,595	18,605	381	30,660	82,461	22,562.2
Palo Pinto	6,989	995	7,984	159	11,252	29,008	27,523.4
Panola	3,188	2,609	5,797	139	8,577	24,586	23,578.5
Parker	31,768	8,333	40,101	494	66,693	141,080	28,424.3
Parmer	1,510	1,068	2,578	54	3,915	9,501	27,134.0
Pecos	2,874	840	3,714	72	9,581	15,052	24,674.5
Polk	7,054	1,456	8,510	266	22,810	50,293	16,920.8
Potter	26,509	7,854	34,363	675	54,035	116,063	29,607.2
Presidio	904	370	1,274	42	6,539	6,535	19,495.0
Rains	1,236	866	2,102	62	4,775	12,416	16,929.8
Randall	22,052	9,266	31,318	517	63,900	139,034	22,525.4
Reagan	313	698	1,011	16	1,571	3,836	26,355.6
Real	653	337	990	25	1,702	3,499	28,293.8
Red River	1,178	1,595	2,773	75	4,873	11,649	23,804.6
Reeves	3,172	2,768	5,940	77	14,233	16,154	36,771.1
Refugio	1,437	924	2,361	42	3,816	6,871	34,361.8
Roberts	161	30	191	2	265	851	22,444.2
Robertson	3,859	1,139	4,998	79	7,943	17,708	28,224.5
Rockwall	22,340	9,696	32,036	286	63,543	103,363	30,993.7
Runnels	1,229	1,465	2,694	73	4,612	10,121	26,617.9
Rusk	7,065	5,498	12,563	244	22,433	54,526	23,040.4
Sabine	1,013	666	1,679	94	3,896	10,917	15,379.7
San Augustine	786	385	1,171	47	3,610	8,458	13,844.9
San Jacinto	4,931	1,659	6,590	111	9,973	29,506	22,334.4
San Patricio	12,294	4,468	16,762	366	38,237	66,688	25,135.0
San Saba	954	572	1,526	40	2,460	6,227	24,506.2
Schleicher	311	366	677	9	1,301	2,822	23,990.1
Scurry	5,751	379	6,130	108	8,006	16,697	36,713.2
Shackelford	238	888	1,126	12	1,207	3,382	33,293.9
Shelby	3,338	2,081	5,419	139	9,732	24,249	22,347.3
Sherman	301	136	437	16	1,029	3,077	14,202.1
Smith	31,409	18,514	49,923	1,023	110,859	231,516	21,563.5
Somervell	1,440	813	2,253	37	4,136	9,569	23,544.8
Starr	17,580	8,077	25,657	392	73,239	63,690	40,284.2
Stephens	1,194	1,123	2,317	53	3,440	9,556	24,246.5
Sterling	119	221	340	9	503	1,254	27,113.2
Stonewall	86	336	422	7	601	1,382	30,535.5
Sutton	446	550	996	14	1,663	3,664	27,183.4
Swisher	1,373	1,280	2,653	34	2,989	7,439	35,663.4
Tarrant	536,241	106,125	642,366	5,622	1,221,060	2,060,239	31,179.2
Taylor	15,573	27,262	42,835	780	64,830	139,044	30,806.8
Terrell	110	46	156	3	410	794	19,647.4
Terry	926	1,387	2,313	88	5,175	12,544	18,439.1
Throckmorton	97	202	299	10	607	1,448	20,649.2
Titus	6,201	4,015	10,216	139	14,082	33,690	30,323.5
Tom Green	12,080	31,264	43,344	491	56,880	117,613	36,853.1
Travis	267,631	56,056	323,687	1,865	917,117	1,273,554	25,416.0
Trinity	2,189	1,105	3,294	81	6,301	14,530	22,670.3
Tyler	2,647	2,972	5,619	91	8,233	22,735	24,715.2
Upshur	3,824	5,169	8,993	197	14,785	41,204	21,825.6
Upton	178	814	992	19	1,539	3,619	27,410.9
Uvalde	10,189	1,213	11,402	152	14,688	26,743	42,635.5
Val Verde	14,271	1,107	15,378	313	36,395	50,853	30,240.1
Van Zandt	7,167	4,404	11,571	302	21,732	56,376	20,524.7
Victoria	20,134	5,233	25,367	431	45,978	91,329	27,775.4
Walker	21,330	3,455	24,785	216	36,422	75,949	32,633.7
Waller	9,564	2,137	11,701	114	24,447	54,822	21,343.6
Ward	2,434	892	3,326	51	4,369	11,530	28,846.5
Washington	8,909	1,760	10,669	157	18,756	35,570	29,994.4
Webb	96,877	10,801	107,678	1,092	310,958	280,775	38,350.3
Wharton	8,222	3,809	12,031	230	22,279	41,224	29,184.5
Wheeler	985	339	1,324	24	2,114	5,178	25,569.7
Wichita	38,357	2,905	41,262	761	61,649	132,920	31,042.7
Wilbarger	3,244	951	4,195	94	6,705	12,465	33,654.2
Willacy	7,226	1,952	9,178	139	15,068	21,566	42,557.7
Williamson	136,427	35,811	172,238	952	418,728	589,216	29,231.7
Wilson	8,202	4,395	12,597	168	27,130	52,127	24,166.0
Winkler	1,584	642	2,226	36	3,085	7,990	27,859.8
Wise	16,370	3,223	19,593	287	27,928	69,609	28,147.2
Wood	5,320	3,098	8,418	311	20,488	45,084	18,671.8
Yoakum	764	577	1,341	44	3,526	8,829	15,188.6
Young	3,785	710	4,495	103	7,516	19,029	23,621.8
Zapata	2,464	1,982	4,446	57	8,613	14,196	31,318.7
Zavala	3,500	895	4,395	70	6,181	12,116	36,274.3
Final update May 10, 2023; Vaccinations final update November 30, 2022; Data is publicly reported by Texas Department of State Health Services

As of January 2026, the Texas Department of State Health Services (DSHS) classifies COVID-19 as part of a broader "Respiratory Virus" category for surveillance. Current estimates from the CDC indicate that the epidemic trend in Texas is "not changing," with stable levels of transmission observed statewide during the early 2026 winter season.

== See also ==
- Timeline of the COVID-19 pandemic in the United States
- COVID-19 pandemic in Austin, Texas – for impact on Texas's state capital
- COVID-19 pandemic in the United States – for impact on the country
- COVID-19 pandemic – for impact on other countries
- COVID-19 County Projections
