= Anuket (disambiguation) =

Anuket was the Ancient Egyptian goddess of the cataracts of the Nile.

Anuket may also refer to:

- Anuket Vallis ('Anuket Valley'), a geological feature on Venus
- MS River Anuket, a Nile River cruise ship involved in the COVID-19 pandemic on cruise ships
