= COVID-19 vaccination in Egypt =

Plan to immunize against COVID-19

- Date: 24 January 2021 - present
- Location: Egypt
- Cause: COVID-19 pandemic
- Motive: COVID-19 pandemic in Egypt

COVID-19 vaccination in Egypt is an ongoing immunisation campaign against severe acute respiratory syndrome coronavirus 2 (SARS-CoV-2), the virus that causes coronavirus disease 2019 (COVID-19), in response to the ongoing pandemic in the country.

== History ==
=== Timeline ===
Egypt began its vaccination program on 24 January 2021. Egypt received 50,000 doses of the Sinopharm BIBP vaccine on 10 December 2020, followed by 50,000 doses of the AstraZeneca vaccine on 31 January 2021. In February, March and May 2021, Egypt received 1.1 million doses of the Sinopharm BIBP vaccine and 2.55 million doses of the Oxford–AstraZeneca vaccine.

On 6 August 2021, Romania announced its intention to donate 525,000 doses of the Oxford-AstraZeneca vaccine to Egypt.

In October 2021, the United States delivered 8.25 million doses of the Pfizer-BioNTech vaccine to Egypt through COVAX.

On 25 December 2021, the United States delivered a further shipment of 1.5 million doses of the Pfizer-BioNTech vaccine via COVAX.

On 30 December 2021, Egypt received 347,460 doses of the Oxford-AstraZeneca vaccine through COVAX.

By the end of 2021, more than 55 million vaccine doses had been administered.

On 1 January 2022, Egypt received 1.5 million doses of the Pfizer-BioNTech vaccine donated by the United States.

== Progress ==
1,315 vaccine doses had been administered by the end of February 2021; 78,879 doses by the end of March; 928,930 by the end of April; 2,586,274 by the end of May; 4,282,641 by the end of June; 5,337,506 by the end of July; 8,741,005 by the end of August; 13.8 million by the end of September; 25.1 million by the end of October; 37.7 million by the end of November; 53.7 million by the end of December 2021; 65.1 million by the end of January 2022; 71.4 million by the end of February 2022; 78 million by the end of March 2022; 82 million by the end of April 2022. 49% of the targeted population had been fully vaccinated by the end of 2021.

Cumulative vaccinations in Egypt

View source data.

== See also ==
- COVID-19 vaccination in Turkey
