= COVID-19 vaccination in Turkey =

Plan to immunize against COVID-19

- Date: 14 January 2021 – present
- Location: Turkey
- Cause: COVID-19 pandemic
- Target: Full immunisation of people in Turkey against COVID-19
- Participants: 53,024,115 people completely vaccinated (as of 9 November 2023)
- Website: covid19asi.saglik.gov.tr

The COVID-19 vaccination campaign in Turkey began on January 14, 2021. As of April 2, 2022, 57,784,362 people have received their first dose, and 52,982,877 people have been fully vaccinated. 27,648,857 people received their third dose. 63% of the total population in Turkey is fully vaccinated.

== Effect of vaccine ==
In January 2021, new COVID-19 cases in Turkey were at 12,203. Then, in April 2021, they rose to 40,806. However, due to the vaccine rollout, cases dropped to 5,288 in July 2021.

== Public perception of vaccine ==
Through a study done on the population of Turkey's perception of the COVID-19 vaccine, it was shown that only 62.7% of participants had a positive perception of the vaccine. Specifically, those with previous experience with COVID-19, those with bachelor's degrees or higher, and those with experience with influenza vaccines were more likely to have a positive perception of the COVID-19 vaccine. Older people were more likely to have a negative perception of the vaccine.

== Vaccines on order ==
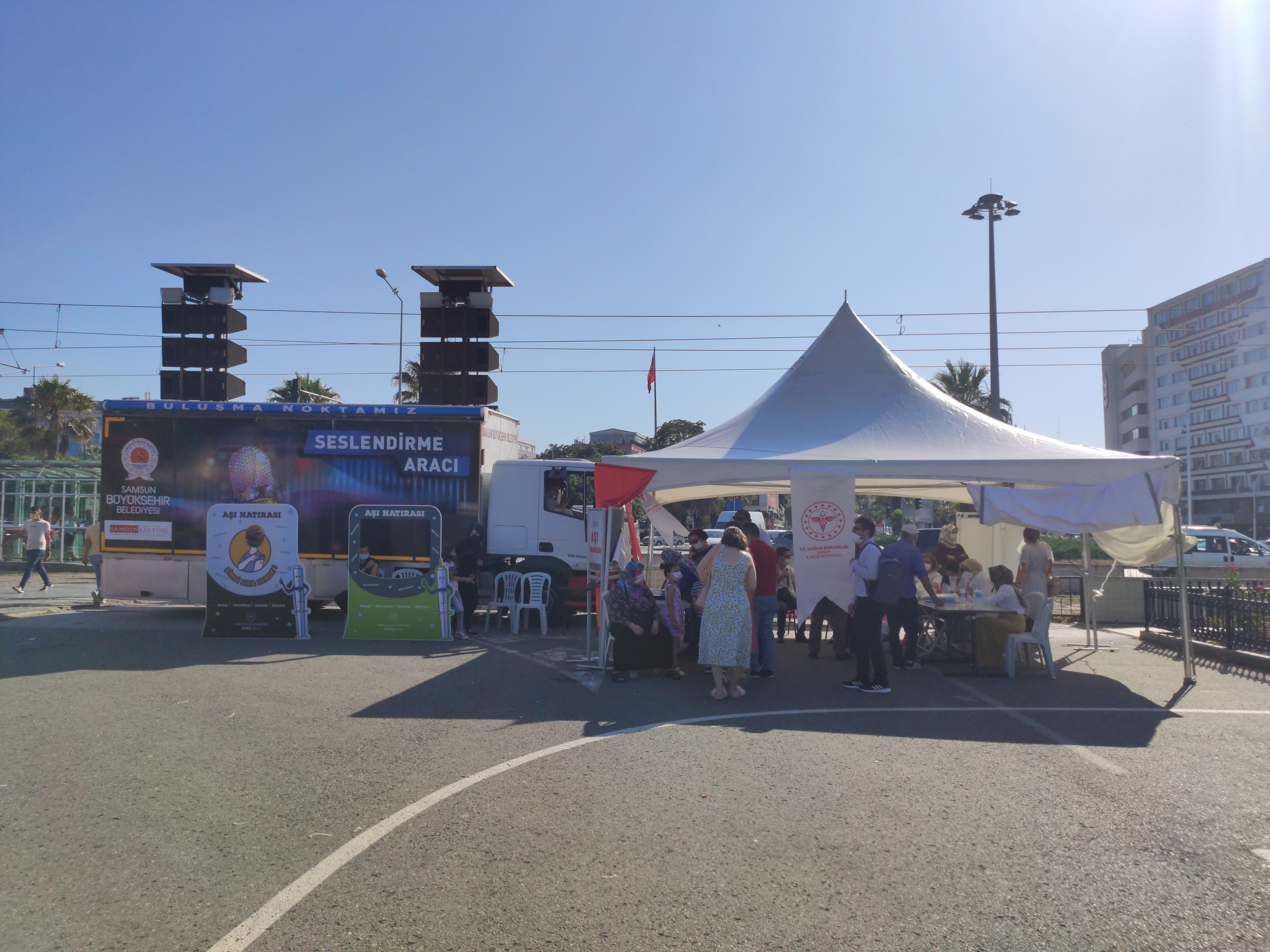
Vaccination center in Samsun

Turkey currently uses 4 different COVID-19 vaccines.

Vaccine	Approval	Deployment
Pfizer–BioNTech		
Sinovac		
Sputnik V		
TurkoVac		

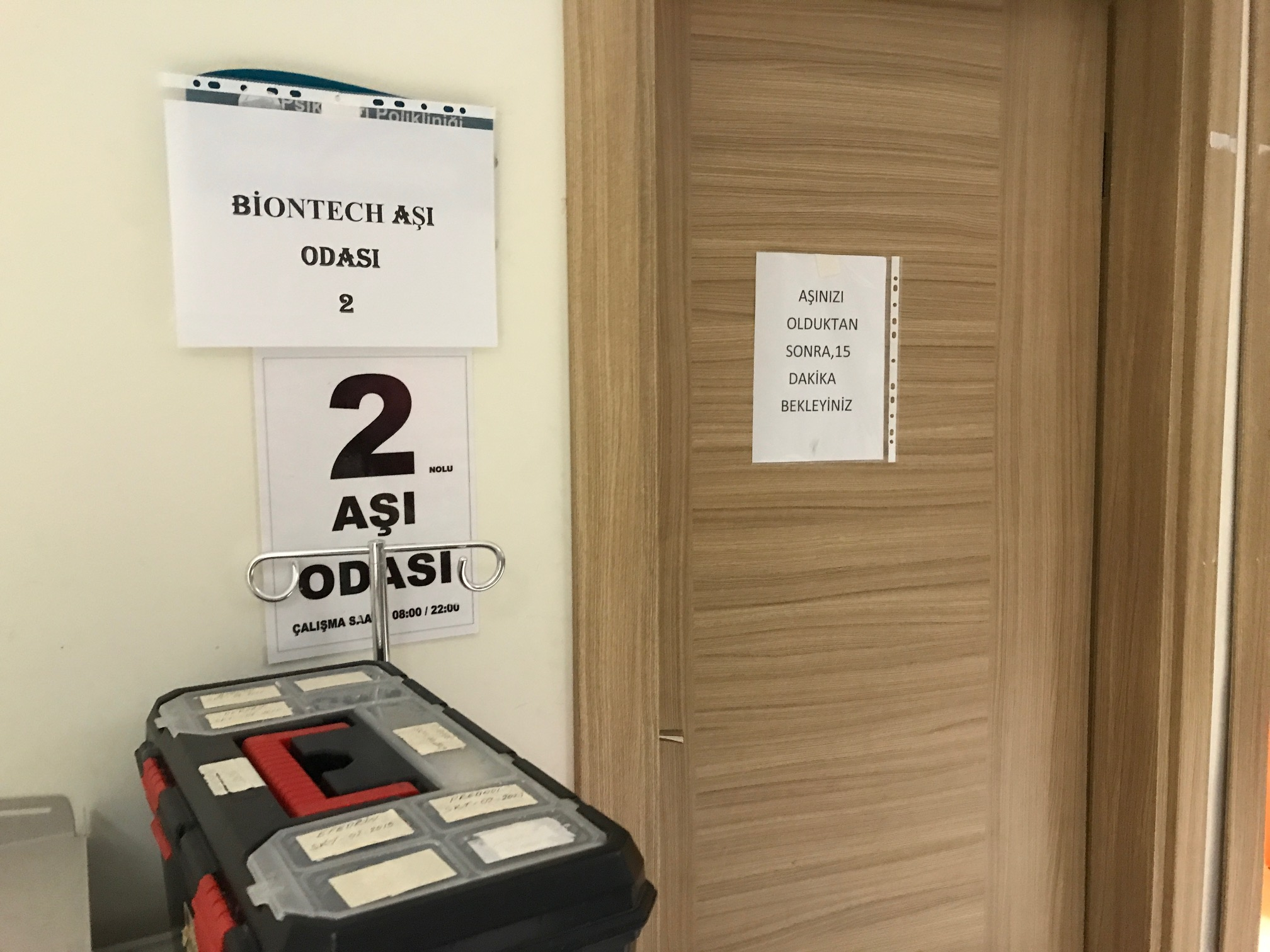
BioNTech vaccination room in Turkey

== Gallery ==
Vaccines used in Turkey

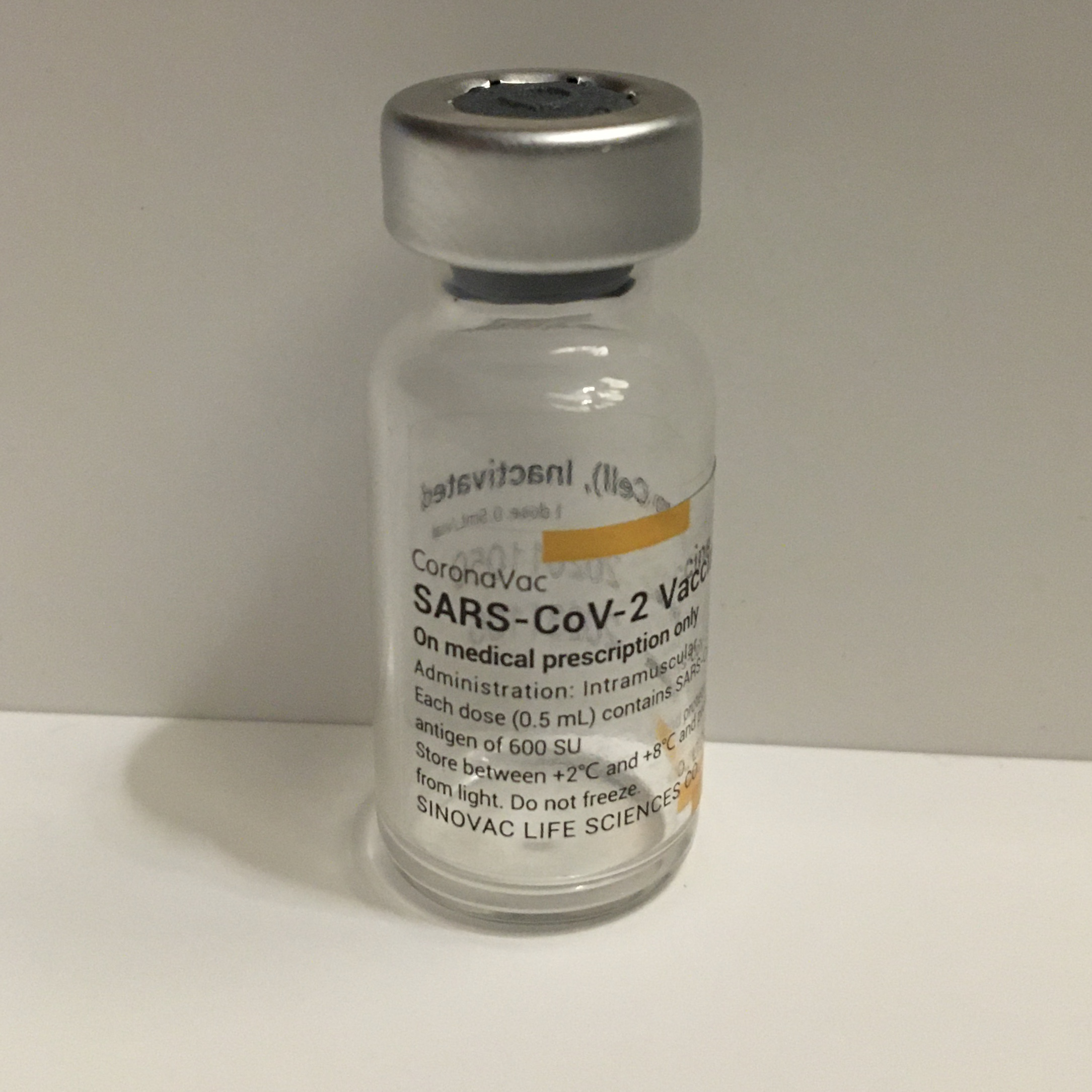
Sinovac

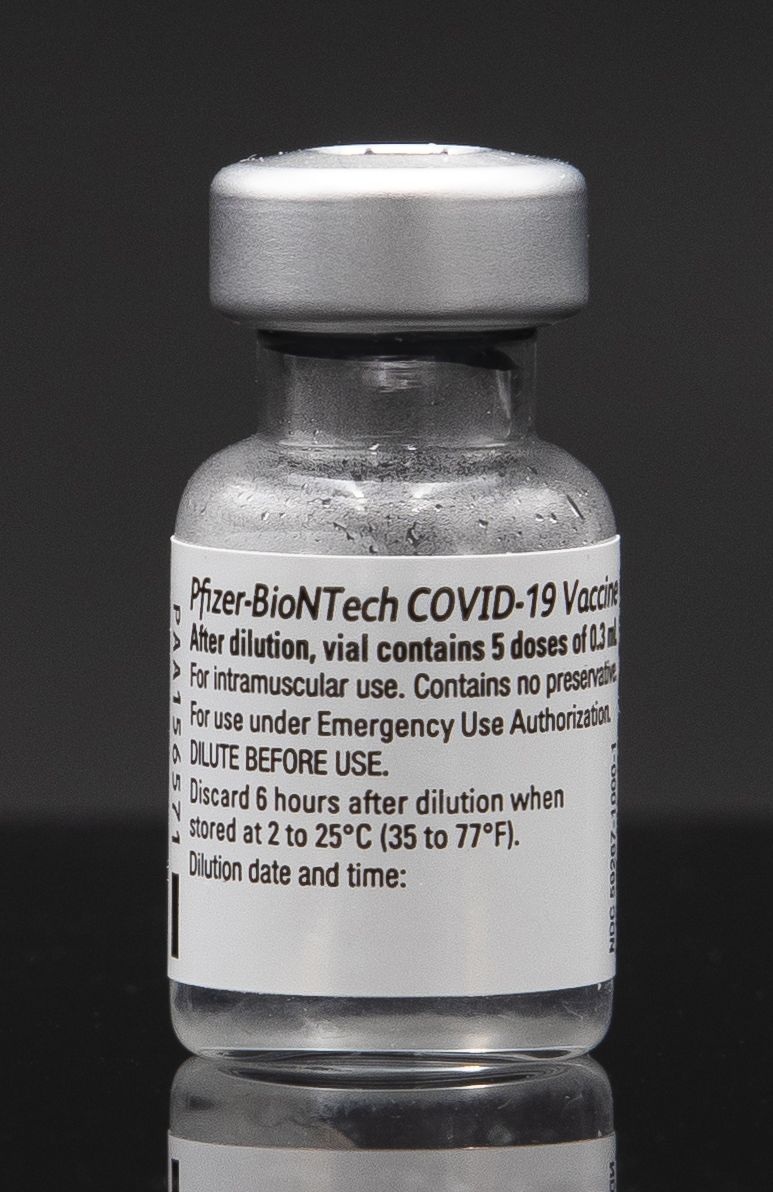
BioNTech

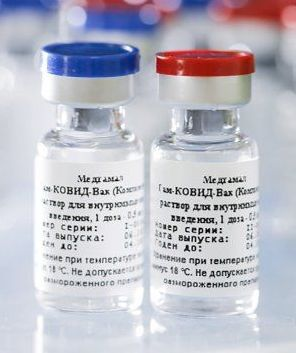
Sputnik V

== See also ==
- COVID-19 vaccination in Egypt
- COVID-19 vaccination in Saudi Arabia
- COVID-19 vaccination in Yemen
- COVID-19 vaccine
- COVID-19 pandemic in Italy
