= COVID-19 pandemic in Egypt =

Aspect of viral disease pandemic

- Disease: COVID-19
- Pathogen: SARS-CoV-2
- Location: Egypt
- First outbreak: Wuhan, Hubei, China
- Index case: Cairo
- Arrival date: 14 February 2020 (6 years, 8 months, 1 week and 6 days)
- Confirmed cases: 516,023
- Recovered: 491,193
- Deaths: 24,830
- Fatality rate: 4.81%
- Territories: Cases in 27 Governorates
- Vaccinations: 56,907,320 (total vaccinated); 42,337,176 (fully vaccinated); 112,673,540 (doses administered)

The COVID-19 pandemic in Egypt was a part of the worldwide pandemic of coronavirus disease 2019 (COVID-19) caused by severe acute respiratory syndrome coronavirus 2 (SARS-CoV-2). The virus was confirmed to have reached Egypt on 14 February 2020.

== Background ==
On 12 January 2020, the World Health Organization (WHO) confirmed that a novel coronavirus was the cause of a respiratory illness in a cluster of people in Wuhan, Hubei, China, which was reported to the WHO on 31 December 2019.

The case fatality ratio for COVID-19 has been much lower than SARS of 2003, but the transmission has been significantly greater, with a significant total death toll. Model-based simulations for Egypt indicate that the 95% confidence interval for the time-varying reproduction number R_{t} has fluctuated around 1.0 since August 2020.

== Timeline ==
=== 2020 ===
==== February ====
- Egypt's health ministry announced the first case in the country at Cairo International Airport involving a Chinese national on 14 February. Egyptian authorities had notified the World Health Organization (WHO) and the patient had been placed in quarantined isolation in hospital. Preventive measures were subsequently taken to monitor those who came into contact with the person where the others tested negative.
- In late February and early March, multiple foreign severe acute respiratory syndrome coronavirus 2 (SARS-CoV-2) cases associated with travel to Egypt were reported – including two cases in the United States, two cases in Tunisia (Plus several potential cases as the two initial cases were part of 1,000 now quarantined football supporters who visited Egypt from Tunis from 27 February to 1 March) two cases in France, one case in Canada, and one case in Taiwan.
- On 28 February, the Egyptian cabinet officially denied rumors of covering up SARS-CoV-2 cases. On 1 March, Qatar banned all arrivals from Egypt, excepting Qatari nationals, as a safety measure to prevent the spread of SARS-CoV-2. On the same day, Egypt announced the detection of a second case of SARS-CoV-2. On 2 March, Kuwait announced that it would test all arrivals from Egypt and Syria for SARS-CoV-2. It was estimated by Egypt Watch that Egypt had 20 lab-confirmed cases of SARS-CoV-2, which was reported by Middle East Monitor on 2 March. The people with confirmed cases were claimed to be held in military hospitals, inaccessible to the Egyptian Ministry of Health and official health statistics reported to WHO. Confirmed cases allegedly absent from official statistics included a family in Tanta Military Hospital and four people in Qasr El Eyni Hospital.

==== March ====
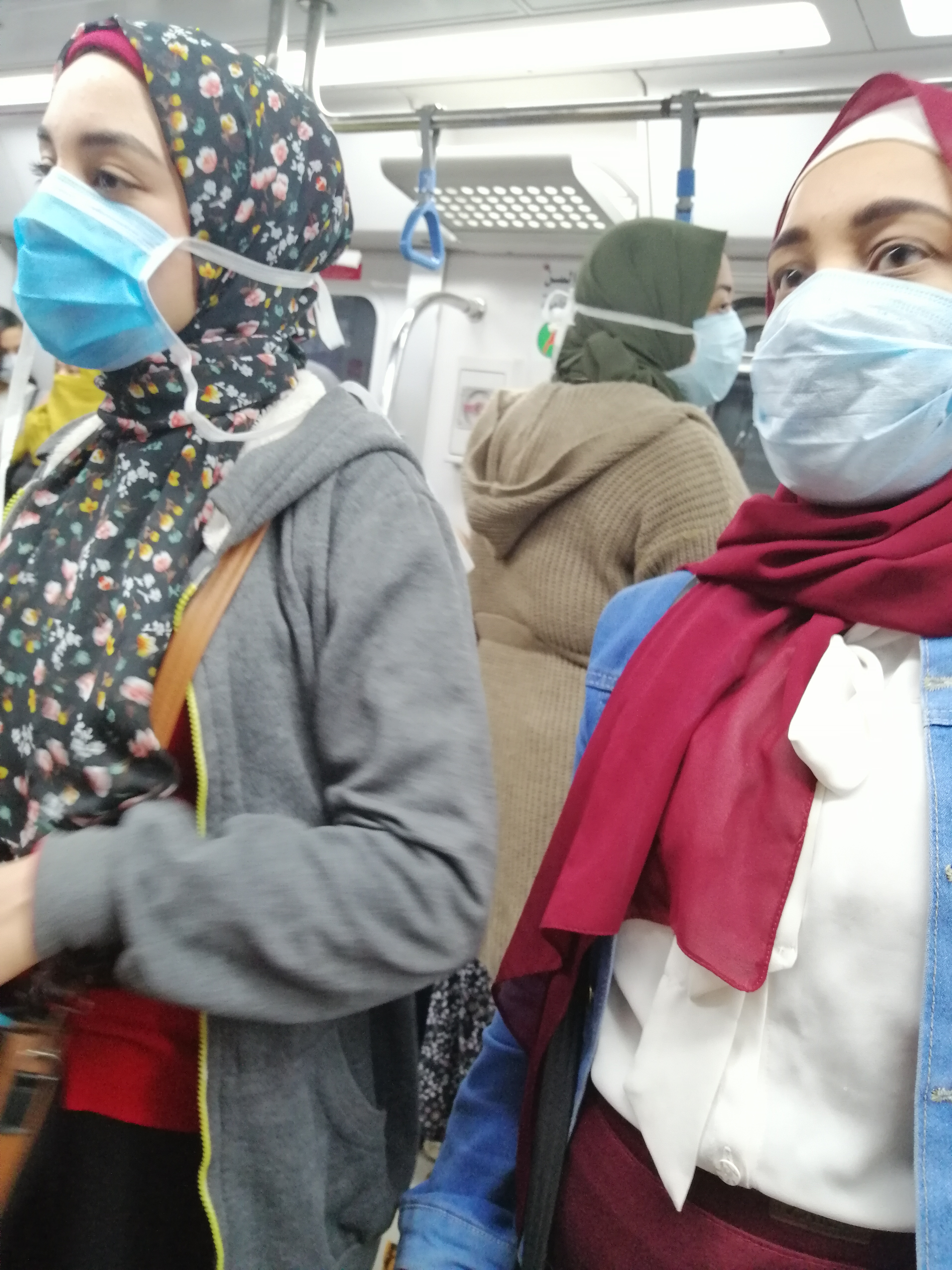
Women in Cairo wearing face masks in March 2020 - Mask fit pictured may give off wrong impression, ensure fit is snug and with no gaps.

- 8 March: A 60-year-old German citizen died in Hurghada, the first German fatality from the virus.
- 9 March: The World Health Organization said that there were 56 confirmed cases in Egypt. On the same day, the Egyptian Minister of Tourism said that they discovered 3 additional cases with three people who work in a hotel.
- 13 March: A second Tunisian coming back from Egypt tested positive for the virus and Tunisia officially added Egypt to a list of outbreak areas by closing its borders to it and imposing a quarantine to anyone coming from the country.
- 18 March: Police detained four activists after they protested in front of the cabinet headquarters calling for the release of political prisoners to protect them from the spread of coronavirus.
- 19 March: The Ministry of Health in Egypt announced a new death and 46 new cases of coronavirus, bringing the total number of infected to 256 cases, including 7 deaths and recovering 28 of those infected. The Egyptian government also made a decision to close all restaurants, cafes, nightclubs and public places throughout the country from seven in the evening until six in the morning, starting from Thursday 19 to 31 March 2020. The decision excluded places that sell food, pharmacies and home delivery services.
- 20 March: The Egyptian Ministry of Health announced the death of a 60-year-old Egyptian citizen who was returning from Italy, and 29 cases proved positive laboratory analyzes of the virus including a case of a foreigner and 28 Egyptians, some of whom are returning from abroad, while others who are in contact with positive cases that have been discovered and announced previously, bringing the total of the injured to 285 cases, including 39 who were cured and discharged from the isolation hospital, and 8 deaths. The National Telecom Regulatory Authority together with mobile phone operators is providing Egyptian customers with free minutes (30 times the charged balance) for e-transaction and e-payment in order to enable as many people as possible to stay home for shopping.
- 21 March: A decision was made to suspend prayers in all of Egypt's mosques for a period of two weeks in order to limit the outbreak of the coronavirus based on the necessity of the legitimate and national interest. The Coptic Orthodox Church also announced the closure of all churches and the suspension of ritual services, masses and activities to preserve the health of Egyptians from the danger of the spread of the coronavirus.
- 22 March: On 22 March, the Ministry of Health and Population announced the increase in the number of cases whose laboratory results turned from negative to COVID-19 to 74, and the adviser of the Minister of Health and Population for Media Affairs and the official spokesperson of the ministry revealed that 15 of these cases had been left the Isolation Hospital, including 7 foreigners and 8 Egyptians, after receiving the necessary medical care under supervision of World Health Organization. So the number of those who recovered from the virus became 56 out of 74 cases. He also announced that cases have been in 24 out of the 27 Egyptian governorates. The total number registered in Egypt from the new Corona includes 327 cases, including 56 who were cured and left the isolation hospital, and 14 deaths.
- 31 March: By the end of the month the number of reported cases stood at 710. Of these, 46 were reported to have died, 157 to have recovered, while 507 reportedly remained active cases.

==== April to June ====
- 4 April: Cases surpass 1000.
- By the end of April the number of reported cases had risen by 4827 to 5537. The reported death toll had increased to 392. The number of recovered patients grew to 1381, leaving 3764 active cases at the end of the month.
- In May there were 19448 additional cases, raising the total number of reported cases to 24985. The reported death toll more than doubled to 959. The number of recovered patients increased to 6037, leaving 17989 active cases at the end of the month.
- In June, there were 43326 new cases, raising the total number of reported cases to 68311. The reported death toll more than tripled to 2953. The number of recovered patients increased to 18460, leaving 46898 active cases at the end of the month.

==== July to September ====
- There were 25767 reported cases in July, bringing the total number of cases to 94078. The reported death toll rose to 4805. The number of recovered patients grew to 39638, leaving 49635 active cases at the end of the month (6% more than at the end of June).
- There were 4861 reported cases in August, bringing the number of reported cases to 98939. The death toll rose by 616 to 5421. There were 20589 active cases at the end of the month.
- There were 4140 reported cases in September, bringing the total number of reported cases to 103079. The reported death toll rose to 5914.

==== October to December ====
- There were 4,476 reported cases in October, raising the total number of reported cases to 107,555. The reported death rate rose to 6,266. The number of active cases at the end of the month was 1,837.
- There were 8,356 reported cases in November, raising the total number of reported cases to 115,911. The reported death toll was 6,650. The reported number of recovered patients increased to 102,718, leaving 6,543 active cases at the end of the month.
- Egypt received 50,000 doses of the Sinopharm BIBP vaccine on 10 December, donated by the United Arab Emirates. There were 22,151 reported cases in December, raising the total number of reported cases to 138,062. The reported death toll was 7,631. The reported number of recovered patients increased to 112,105, leaving 18,326 active cases at the end of the month.

=== 2021 ===
==== January to March ====
- Egypt began inoculating healthcare workers with the Sinopharm BIBP vaccine; more than 300 doctors had died by January 24. The vaccines will be free. Those with chronic diseases and the elderly will be next. Egypt has signed deals with Chinese, Russian, and British companies for 100 million doses of vaccine, enough for half the population since most vaccines require two doses. 50,000 doses of AstraZeneca's Covishield vaccines arrived on 31 January.
- There were 27,889 reported cases in January, raising the total number of reported cases to 165,951. The reported death toll was 9,316. The reported number of recovered patients increased to 129,636, leaving 26,999 active cases at the end of the month.
- Egypt received 300,000 doses of the Sinopharm vaccine on 23 February, donated by China.
- There were 16,473 reported cases in February, raising the total number of reported cases to 182,424. The reported death toll was 10,688. The reported number of recovered patients increased to 140,892, leaving 30,844 active cases at the end of the month.
- In March 2021, Egypt received the second donation of 300,000 doses of the Sinopharm vaccine.
- By 28 March 2021, Egypt wants to vaccinate 250.000 people, including medical staff.
- On 31 March, Egypt received 854.000 doses of COVID-19 vaccines and allowed prayers during Ramadan in authorized mosques. The number of reported cases increased to 200,739 while the reported death toll rose to 11,914. The number of recovered patients grew to 153,630, leaving 35,195 active cases at the end of the month.

==== April to June ====
- In April 2021, Egypt started living the third wave of coronavirus although not at its peak yet, but the daily number of cases is increasing.
- The tourism sector of Egypt was drastically affected by rising COVID-19 cases in the country. The revenue for tourism in Egypt plunged by 70% in 2020, while the number of tourists visiting the country dropped from 13.1 million in 2019 to 3.5 million in 2020. Now the country is aiming to regain the lost tourism revenue of $6–7 billion in 2021.
- There were 27,845 reported cases in April, raising the total number of reported cases to 228,584. The reported death toll was 13,402. The reported number of recovered patients increased to 171,542, leaving 43,640 active cases at the end of the month.
- On May 13, Egypt received more than 1.7 million doses of AstraZeneca, as well as 500,000 doses of the Sinopharm vaccine from China.
- There were 34,066 reported cases in May, raising the total number of reported cases to 262,650. The reported death toll was 15,096. The reported number of recovered patients increased to 192,112, leaving 55,442 active cases at the end of the month.
- There were 18,632 reported cases in June, raising the total number of reported cases to 281,282. The reported death toll was 16,169. The reported number of recovered patients increased to 211,384, leaving 53,729 active cases at the end of the month.

==== July to September ====
- On 1 July, Egypt announced the production of the first 300,000 doses of the Chinese Sinovac vaccine through the Egyptian Holding Company for Biological Products and Vaccines (VACSERA).
- There were 2,980 reported cases in July, taking the total number of reported cases to 284,262. The reported death toll was 16,524. The reported number of recovered patients increased to 230,368, leaving 37,370 active cases at the end of the month.
- On 6 August, Romania announced that it will begin to deliver for free 1.3 million COVID-19 vaccines to four countries to help tackle the pandemic. The donation to Egypt consisted of 525,000 doses.
- There were 4,179 reported cases in August, taking the total number of reported cases to 288,441. The reported death toll was 16,736. The reported number of recovered patients increased to 239,343, leaving 32,362 active cases at the end of the month.
- There were 16,083 reported cases in September, raising the total number of reported cases to 304,524. The reported death toll was 17,331. The reported number of recovered patients increased to 256,886, leaving 30,307 active cases at the end of the month.

==== October to December ====
- There were 26,493 reported cases in October, raising the total number of reported cases to 331,017. The reported death toll was 18,651. The reported number of recovered patients increased to 278,267, leaving 34,099 active cases at the end of the month.
- There were 27,561 reported cases in November, raising the total number of reported cases to 358,578. The reported death toll was 20,474. The reported number of recovered patients increased to 297,536, leaving 40,568 active cases at the end of the month.
- Egypt's first case of the omicron variant was confirmed on 18 December.
- There were 26,997 reported cases in December, raising the total number of reported cases to 385,575. The reported death toll was 21,752. The reported number of recovered patients increased to 320,563, leaving 43,260 active cases at the end of the month.

=== 2022 ===
==== January to March ====
- There were 38,113 reported cases in January, raising the total number of reported cases to 423,688. The reported death toll was 22,604. The reported number of recovered patients increased to 356,274, leaving 44,810 active cases at the end of the month.
- There were 58,560 reported cases in February, raising the total number of reported cases to 482,248. The reported death toll was 24,040. The reported number of recovered patients increased to 411,161, leaving 46,047 active cases at the end of the month.
- There were 23,016 reported cases in March, raising the total number of reported cases to 505,264. The reported death toll was 24,417. The reported number of recovered patients increased to 434,506, leaving 46,341 active cases at the end of the month.

==== April to June ====
- There were 10,381 reported cases in April, raising the total number of reported cases to 515,645. The reported death toll was 24,613. The reported number of recovered patients increased to 442,182, leaving 48,850 active cases at the end of the month.
- There were 22 reported cases in May, raising the total number of reported cases to 515,667. The reported death toll was 24,624. The reported number of recovered patients increased to 445,701, leaving 45,342 active cases at the end of the month.

== Statistics ==
=== Confirmed new cases per day ===
View source data.

=== Confirmed deaths per day ===
View source data.

== Nile River cruise ship ==
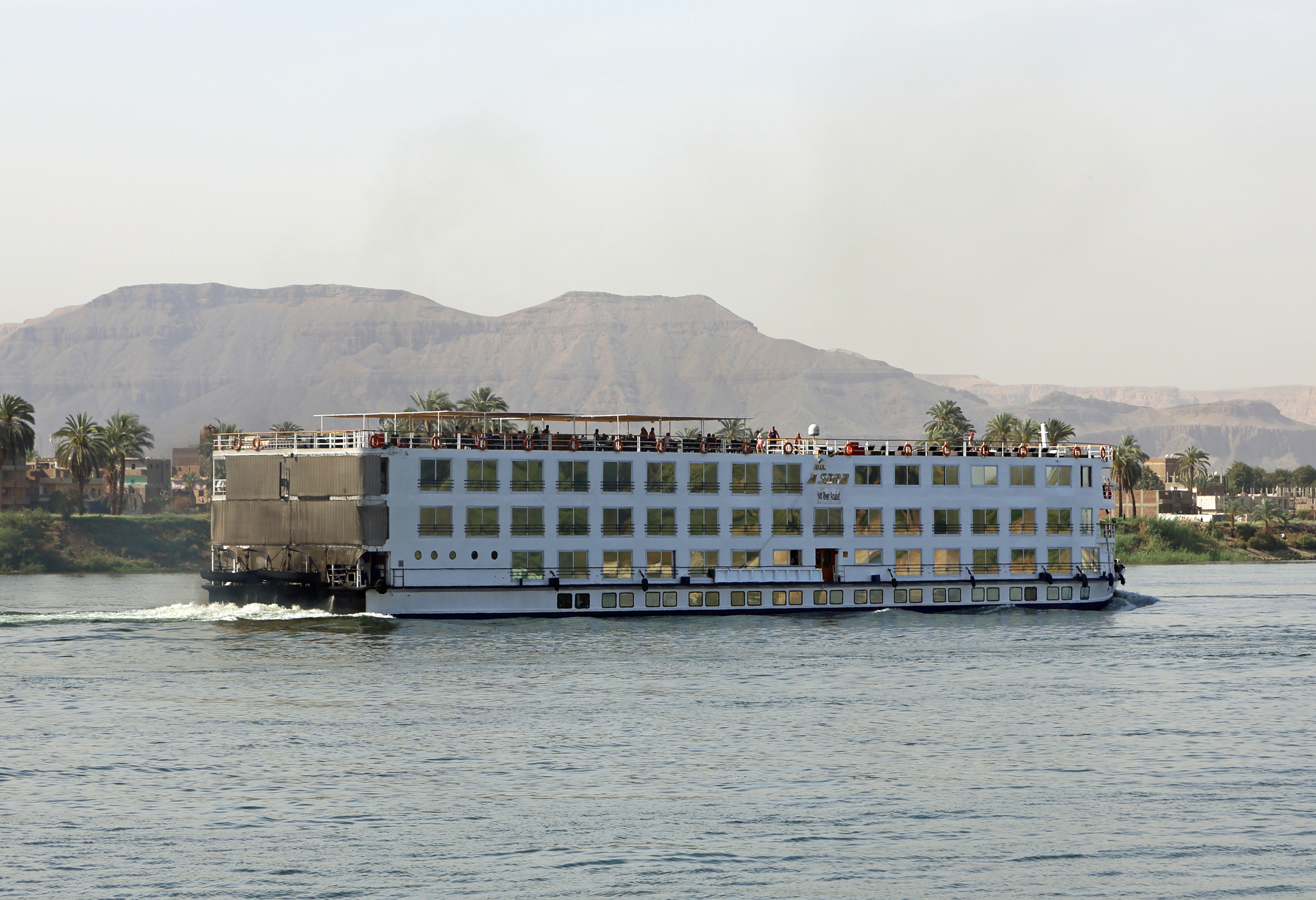
MS River Anuket, pictured March 2018

On 6 March 2020, the Egyptian Health Ministry and WHO confirmed 12 new cases of SARS-CoV-2. The infected persons were among the Egyptian staff aboard a Nile River cruise ship, traveling from Aswan to Luxor. This ship is variously known as MS River Anuket or Asara. All those who tested positive for SARS-CoV-2 did not show any symptoms of the disease. According to tests, the virus spread from a Taiwanese-American female tourist on the ship.

On 7 March, health authorities announced that 45 people on board had tested positive and that the ship had been placed in quarantine at a dock in Luxor. On 9 March, the first international case from the cruise ship came after an American went home and tested positive for SARS-CoV-2.

== Cases traced to travel from Egypt ==
In addition to the confirmed cases within Egypt, there have been a number of documented cases that were detected in other countries and traced to travel from Egypt. The estimate of such cases was at least 97 cases at the end of February 2020, according to public health data and news reports.

Country	Number of cases
United States	52
France	11
Canada	11
Hong Kong	9
Tunisia	2
Japan	2
Saudi Arabia	1
Taiwan	1
Total	89

== Human rights issues ==
On 22 July 2020, a report from Human Rights Watch alleged that COVID-19 had infected multiple people inside several Egyptian prisons. Human Rights Watch said that several detainees died, further stating that the detainees were not tested or had not received adequate medical treatment after experiencing suspected virus symptoms.

During the COVID-19 pandemic, the healthcare workers in Egypt denounced the government's handling of the crisis. The country turned down the globally-accepted PCR test, as it opted to use antibody tests. The World Health Organization stated that the antibody tests do not test or detect the virus, but detects the tested person's immune response to the virus. The rapid use of antibody tests began in Egypt from April 2020, where nearly 200,000 tests were conducted by the end of that month. The Egyptian health ministry demanded frontline healthcare workers to get tested through the process once at the end of each shift, while PCR was allowed only after they test positive. It was observed that the misuse of antibody tests helped in spread of the virus.

In June 2021, Amnesty International highlighted what it called the Egyptian government's failure to handle the COVID-19 vaccine rollout strategically. Amnesty International says that marginalized people and those at risk were not given prioritization for vaccination. According to Amnesty, the most affected individuals were the ones living in informal urban settlements or remote rural areas, as well as prisoners, refugees and migrants. While the vaccine rollout's announcement came in January, Amnesty stated that people who had registered for a vaccine in March did not get the vaccine even by the end of July. In April, Mada Masr reported that Egyptian parliamentarians and their families were given preferential treatment to choose between the two vaccines and received their jabs sooner than others, despite not being officially listed on any priority group.

== Government responses ==
=== Travel restrictions ===
The minister of aviation closed the airports and suspended all air travel, effective 19 March. The decision to suspend flights in Egypt came into effect from 19 March until 31 July.

=== Testing ===
As of March 25, the ministry of health announced that 25,000 PCR tests have been done. As of April 17, 55,000 PCR tests have been done As of April 23, 90,000 PCR tests have been done. As of May 9, 105,000 PCR tests have been done.

Egypt now has more than 40 PCR testing equipment dispersed all over the country.

=== Censorship ===
Foreign media outlets have reported that certain individuals have been arrested for allegedly spreading false information about the coronavirus pandemic.

== Case estimates ==
Based partly on multiple confirmed COVID-19 cases in other countries being linked to travel in Egypt, infectious disease specialists from the University of Toronto, who studied the disparity between official and presumed infection rates, estimated the number of COVID-19 cases in Egypt to be between 6,270 and 45,070 presumed cases (95% confidence interval) in March 2020, a study which was reported on by various foreign media outlets, including British newspaper The Guardian and U.S. newspaper The New York Times. This projected figure was far higher than the official count of 126 at the time. The Egyptian Ministry of Health dismissed this estimate as "completely false", and the ministry also said that it reports confirmed cases in the country with "full transparency". A reporter for The Guardian had her accreditation revoked by the State Information Service over the perceived inaccurate information, while a reporter for The New York Times was warned by the SIS for similar reasons.

However, a research paper was later published by Egyptian scientists, including Health Minister Hala Zaid, suggesting that some underestimation may have in fact taken place, and that the actual number of COVID-19 cases in Egypt as of 31 March 2020 could have been between 710 and 5,241 cases, potentially up to seven times higher than the recorded official number at the time. This was followed on 21 May 2020 by Khaled Abdel Ghaffar, the Minister of Higher Education, suggesting that the true number of COVID-19 cases at the time might have been at least 71,145.

== See also ==
- COVID-19 pandemic in Africa
- COVID-19 pandemic by country and territory
