= MS River Anuket =

Cruise ship

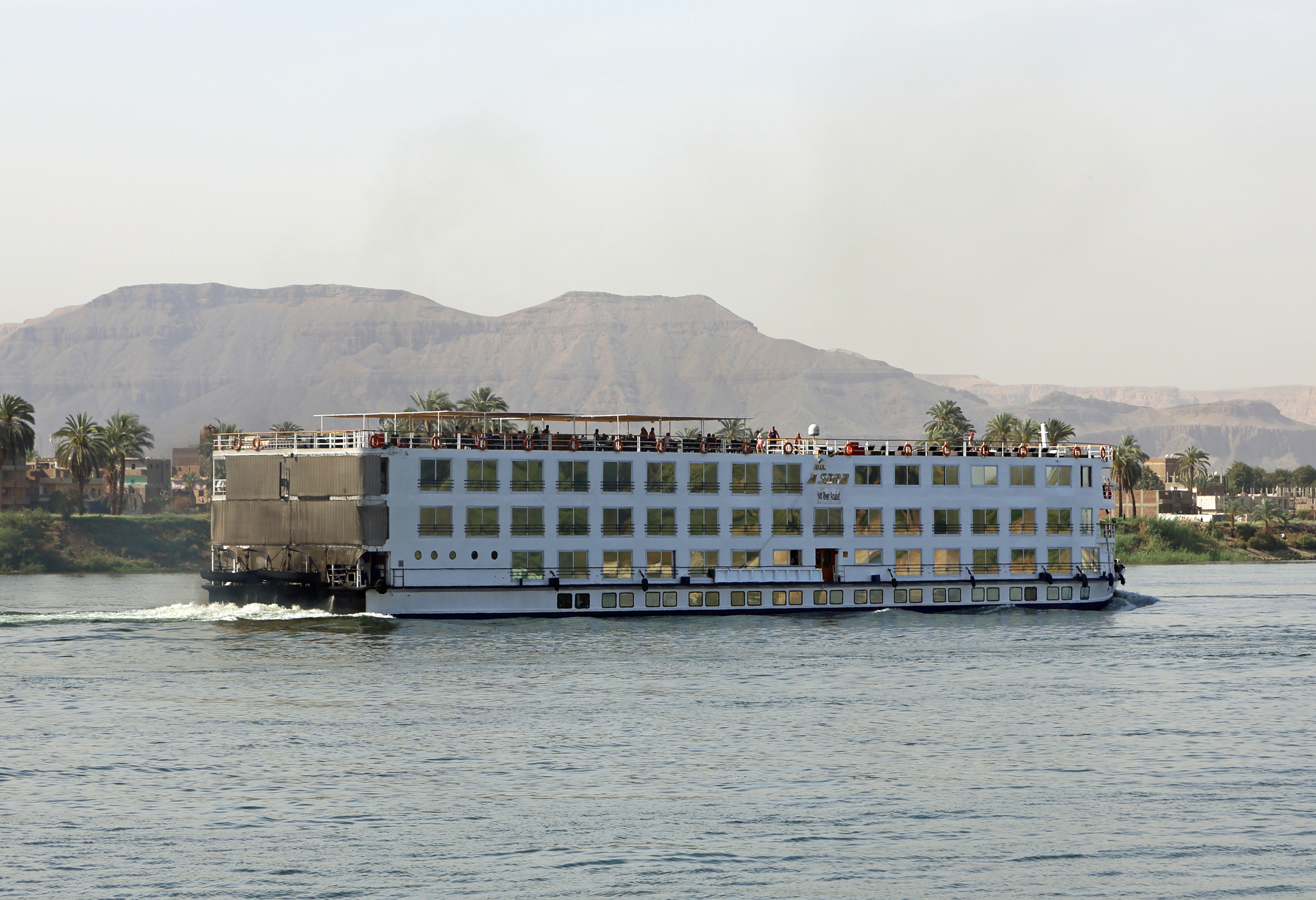
- MS River Anuket, pictured in March 2018

History
- Name: River Anuket (or Asara)
- Namesake: Anuket
- Owner: Holland America Line
- Port of registry: Egypt, Aswan (2018–2019); Aswan, Luxor (2019–present)
- Status: In service

General characteristics
- Type: Cruise ship

MS River Anuket (also known as Asara) is a River Anuket-class cruise ship owned and operated by Holland America Line.

On 6 March 2020 during COVID-19 pandemic on cruise ships, the Egyptian Health Ministry and World Health Organization confirmed 12 new cases of SARS-CoV-2. The infected persons were among the Egyptian staff aboard travelling from Aswan to Luxor. All those who tested positive for SARS-CoV-2 did not show any symptoms of the disease. According to tests, the virus spread from a Taiwanese-American female tourist on the ship.

On 7 March, health authorities announced that 45 people on board had tested positive, and that the ship had been placed in quarantine at a dock in Luxor. On 9 March, the first international case from the cruise ship came after an American went home and tested positive for SARS-CoV-2.
