= Kenney (name) =

Kenney is a given name and surname of Irish, Scottish, and English origin. In Ireland, the surname is an Anglicisation of the Irish Ó Cionnaith. It is also a variation of Kenny, MacKenny, O'Kenney, or Keaney.

== Given name ==
- Kenney Bertz (born 1983), American soccer player
- Charles Kenney Duncan (1911–1994), United States Navy admiral
- Kenney Funderburk (born 1992), American professional basketball player
- Kenney Jones (born 1948), English drummer
- Kenney Krysko, Florida herpetologist
- Kenney Mencher (born 1965), American painter
- Mary Kenney O'Sullivan (1864–1943), organizer in the early U.S. labor movement
- Kenney Walker (born 1988), American soccer player

== Surname ==
- Anne Kenney, American television producer and writer
- Anne R. Kenney (1950–2022), librarian and archivist
- Annie Kenney (1879–1953), English suffragette
- Art Kenney (1916–2014), pitcher in Major League Baseball
- Arthur Kenney (disambiguation)
  - Arthur Kenney (basketball) (born 1946), American basketball center
  - Arthur Kenney (priest) (died 1855), Irish priest, Dean of Achonry
- Ben Kenney (born 1977), American musician
- Beverly Kenney (1932–1960), American jazz singer
- Bill Kenney (born 1955), American football player and politician
- Bill Kenney (American football coach), American football coach
- Bob Kenney (1931–2014), American basketball player
- Bryn Kenney (born 1986), American professional poker player
- Cam Kenney, New Hampshire politician
- Casey Kenney (born 1991), American mixed martial artist
- Chad F. Kenney (born 1955), United States District Judge
- Charles Lamb Kenney (1821–1881), British writer
- Christine Kenney, Distinguished Professor of disaster risk reduction
- Clarence Kenney (1882–1950), American football player and coach
- Con Kenney (1896–1959), Australian rules footballer
- Crane Kenney, Major League Baseball executive
- David R. Kenney (1974-), Canadian software executive and writer
- David T. Kenney (1866–1922), American inventor with nine patents
- Dennis Kenney, American actor, singer, dancer
- Donald Kenney (born 1938), American politician
- Douglas Kenney (1946–1980), American writer and actor, co-founder of National Lampoon
- Ed Kenney (1933–2018), American singer and actor
- Edward Kenney (disambiguation)
  - Edward Aloysius Kenney (1884–1938), American politician
  - Edward John Kenney (1924–2019), British Latin professor
  - Edward Patrick Kenney (1888–?), Australian World War I flying ace
  - Edward Tourtellotte Kenney (1888–1974), merchant, agent and political figure in British Columbia
- Emma Kenney (born 1999), American actress
- Frederick J. Kenney, American Rear Admiral, Judge Advocate General of the US Coast Guard
- Gene Kenney (1928–2022), American wrestler, football player and soccer coach
- George Kenney (1889–1977), United States Army Air Forces general in World War II
- George T. Kenney (born 1957), Republican member of the Pennsylvania House of Representatives
- H. Wesley Kenney (1926–2015), American television producer and director
- Heather North Kenney (1945–2017), American television and voice actress
- James Kenney (disambiguation)
  - James Kenney (dramatist) (1780–1849), English dramatist
  - James J. Kenney (1869–1916), American firefighter, first fire chief of Berkeley, California
- Jenny (Jane) Kenney (1884–1961) also known as Jennie, British suffragette and Montessori teacher, sister of Annie Kenney
- Jason Kenney (born 1968), Canadian politician
- Jenny (Jane) Kenney (1884-1961), English suffragette
- Jerry Kenney (born 1945), American Major League Baseball infielder
- Jessie Kenney (1887–1985), English suffragette
- Jessika Kenney, experimental vocalist, composer, and teacher
- Jim Kenney (born 1958), American Democratic politician
- Joe Kenney, American football player and coach
- John Kenney (disambiguation)
  - John Kenney (baseball) (1844–1893), American professional baseball player
  - John A. Kenney Jr. (1914–2003), American dermatologist
  - John T. Kenney (1911–1972), English illustrator
- Joseph Kenney (born 1960), American politician
- June Kenney (1933–2021), American actress
- Kitty Kenney (1880–1952), English suffragette
- Kristie Kenney (born 1955), career U.S. diplomat
- Larry Kenney (born 1947), American radio personality and voice actor
- Laura Kenney (born 1985), Scottish long-distance runner
- Lawrence Joyce Kenney (1930–1990), American Roman Catholic bishop
- Lelon Kenney (1935–2018), American politician, farmer, and businessman
- Leo Kenney (1925–2001), American abstract painter
- Madeline Kenney, American singer-songwriter
- Mart Kenney (1910–2006), Canadian musician and bandleader
- Matthew Kenney (born 1964), American Celebrity chef and author
- Michael Kenney, musician in the English band Iron Maiden
- Mick Kenney (born 1980), British musician, artist, and record producer
- Mo Kenney (born 1990), Canadian singer/songwriter
- Nell Kenney (1876–1953), English suffragette
- Padraic Kenney (born 1963), American historian, writer, and professor
- Pat Kenney (born 1968), American professional wrestler also known as Simon Diamond
- Peter Kenney (1779–1841), Irish Jesuit priest
- Phyllis Gutiérrez Kenney (1936–2025), American politician of the Democratic Party
- R. C. Kenney, American college sports coach
- Raymond Kenney, fictional hacker from the game Watch Dogs
- Richard Kenney (disambiguation)
  - Richard Kenney (missionary), missionary to Bombay
  - Richard Kenney (poet) (born 1948), poet and professor of English
  - Richard R. Kenney (1856–1931), American lawyer and politician
- Robyn Kenney (born 1979), American field hockey player
- Sean Kenney (disambiguation)
  - Sean Kenney (actor) (born 1944), American actor
  - Sean Kenney (artist) (born 1976), New York-based artist
- Seth H. Kenney (1836-1917), American farmer and politician
- Skip Kenney, American swimming coach
- Steve Kenney (born 1955), professional American football player
- Susan Kenney (born 1941), American short story writer and novelist
- Ted Kenney (born 1966), Director, Field and Technical Operations at Fox Sports
- Tim Kenney, director of athletics for St. Bonaventure University
- Vin Kenney (1892–1959), Australian rules footballer
- W. John Kenney (1904–1992), United States Assistant Secretary of the Navy
- William Kenney (disambiguation)
  - William Kenney (business executive) (1870–1939), American business executives, president of the Great Northern Railway
  - William Kenney (bishop) (born 1946), English Roman Catholic bishop

== See also ==
- Senator Kenney (disambiguation)
- Kenney (disambiguation)
- Kenney family
- Kinney (disambiguation)
- Kenny (disambiguation)
