= Kenneth James =

Kenneth, Kenny, or Ken James is the name of:

== Entertainment ==
- Ken James (actor) (born 1948), Australian actor and celebrity chef
- Ken James, on the Canadian soap opera Riverdale
- Kenneth W. James, voice actor for Bowser in Mario games since Super Mario Galaxy
- Kenneth Tyler James (born 1982), musician
- Kenny James (My Name Is Earl), a character on My Name Is Earl

== Sports ==
- Ken James (cricketer) (1904–1976), New Zealand Test cricketer
- Ken James (basketball) (born 1945), represented Australia at the 1972 Summer Olympics
- Kenny James (American football) (born 1984), running back

== Other ==
- Ken James (politician) (1934–2014), Canadian member of Parliament
- Kenneth James (politician), see Endorsements for the Progressive Conservative Party of Canada leadership convention, 1993
- Ken James (educator), Commissioner of Education for the state of Arkansas

== See also ==
- James Kenny (disambiguation)
