= James Kenny =

James Kenny may refer to:

- James C. Kenny (born 1953), American ambassador to Ireland (2003–2006)
- James Kenny (politician) (1898–1954), Australian politician
- James Kenny (VC) (c. 1824–1862), British soldier and recipient of the Victoria Cross
- James Kenny (archdeacon) (died 1822), Anglican priest
- Jim Kenny (1906–1967), Australian politician

== See also ==
- James Kenney (disambiguation)
- Kenny James (disambiguation)
