= John Kenny =

John Kenny may refer to:

== Politics ==
- John Kenny (politician) (1889–1978), Australian politician
- John Kenny (Clan-na-Gael) (1847–1924), Irish republican
- John V. Kenny (1893–1975), American mayor

== Sports ==
- John Kenny (cricketer) (1883-1937), New Zealand cricketer
- John Kenny (Gaelic footballer) (born 1973/1974), Irish Gaelic footballer
- John Kenny (rugby league) (1907–1994), English rugby league footballer
- Johnjo Kenny (born 1961), also known as John Kenny, Scottish and Irish curler and coach

== Others ==
- John Kenny (trombonist) (born 1957), British trombonist and composer
- John Martin Kenny (died 1918), Australian superintendent
- John Patrick Kenny (born 1942), British entrepreneur

== See also ==
- Jon Kenny (1957–2024), Irish comedian
- John Kenney (disambiguation)
- Jack Kenny (born 1958), American writer
