= Kewney =

Kewney is a surname. Notable people with the surname include:

- Alf Kewney (1882–1959), English rugby player
- Arthur V. Kewney (1873–1956), Australian horseracing official
- Guy Kewney (1946–2010), British journalist

== See also ==
- Kenney (name)
