= John Kinney =

John Kinney may refer to:

- John F. Kinney (1816–1902), American attorney, judge, and politician, Justice of the Supreme Court of Iowa and twice Chief Justice of the Supreme Court of the Territory of Utah
- John Francis Kinney (1937–2019), American Catholic bishop
- John Kinney (outlaw) (1847–1919), American Old West outlaw

== See also ==
- John Kinney Gang, founded by the outlaw
- John Kenny (disambiguation)
- John McKinney (disambiguation)
