= JKX =

JKX may refer to:

- The Jamie Kennedy Experiment, an American television show
- JKX Oil & Gas, a British exploration and production company
