= Arthur Kenney =

Arthur Kenney or Art Kenney may refer to:

- Arthur Kenney (basketball) (born 1946), American basketball player
- Arthur Kenney (priest) (c.1776–1855), Irish priest and Dean of Achonry
- Arthur Robert Kenney-Herbert (1840–1916), British Army colonel
- Art Kenney (1916–2014), American Major League Baseball pitcher

== See also ==
- Arthur Kenny (1878–1934), Australian cricketer
