= John Patrick Kenny =

British businessman (born 1942)

John Patrick Kenny (born 1942) is the founder of JKX Oil & Gas, one of the United Kingdom's largest oil production and exploration businesses.

== Career ==
Educated at University College, London where he studied chemical engineering, John Kenny established the JP Kenny Group of Companies in the 1978.

Just before he sold the business to Wood Group in 1993 he established JP Kenny Exploration & Production Ltd, the forerunner of JKX Oil & Gas.

He subsequently left JKX Oil & Gas and is now Chairman of Ascent Resources plc, another listed company.

In 1995 he was appointed a Fellow of University College, London.
