= Seán Kenny =

Seán Kenny may refer to:

- Seán Kenny (politician) (born 1942), Irish Labour Party politician
- Seán Kenny (hurler) (born 1923), Irish hurler for Tipperary
- Sean Kenny (theatre designer) (1929–1973), Irish theatre and film designer
- Seán Kenny (novelist, philosopher) (born 1956) author Hungry Earth, Fast-Wing, The Ulstermen, Out Of Step, Layer Cake Society (forthcoming)

== See also ==
- Sean Kenney (disambiguation)
