= Susan Kenney =

American short story writer and novelist (born 1941)

- Born: April 28, 1941 (age 85); Summit, New Jersey, U.S.
- Education: Northwestern University (BA); Cornell University (PhD)
- Occupations: Writer; novelist
- Spouse: Edwin Kenney (died 1992) spouse Anthony J Corrado married 2009
- Children: 2
- Writing career
- Notable awards: O. Henry Award (1982)

Susan McIlvaine Kenney (born April 28, 1941) is an American novelist, short story writer, literary critic, and educator. She is best known for her novels In Another Country and Sailing, as well as her Roz Howard mystery series. Her work has received major literary awards, appeared in anthologies and been reviewed widely in national media. Kenney taught literature and creative writing at Colby College for over three decades, and her fiction, essays and reviews have appeared in literary journals, leading magazines and newspapers.

== Early life and education ==
Kenney was born in Summit, New Jersey on April 28, 1941, the first child of Virginia Tucker McIlvaine, a college graduate with B.A. in English and Music, and James Morrow McIlvaine, a college graduate with a B.A. in Mathematics and Logic and a JD law degree from NYU. At that time he was newly employed in a promising line of work with the Sun Oil Company, starting with the management of a service station in Elizabeth, NJ.

In 1946 James was promoted to an executive position as a land management lawyer at the Sun Oil Offices in Toledo Ohio.

The McIlvaine family moved to Toledo, Ohio, where Susan Kenney attended Harvard Elementary School from kindergarten through sixth grade. In the summer of 1953, her education was interrupted when her father died of a heart attack while on a business trip. Kenney, her mother and her two younger siblings remained in Toledo until October 1953, when they relocated to Skaneateles, New York. This village, where her mother's family lived, served as the setting and inspiration for much of her subsequent writing

In October Susan joined the seventh grade at the junior high in Skaneateles Central School, graduating from Skaneateles Senior High School in June 1953.

Kenney was a high-achieving secondary school student, graduating with the second-highest grade average in her class, SAT scores above 1200, and recognition as a National Merit Scholarship Finalist. She was active in journalism and athletics, serving as assistant editor of the school newspaper, writing a column for the Skaneateles Press, and competing in track and field, and she earned college credit by successfully completing Advanced Placement examinations in literature and history.

In the fall of 1959 with the extra college-level credits she had earned in high school, Susan matriculated as a second quarter freshman at the Northwestern University College of Liberal Arts and Sciences with a double major in English Literature and Concentration in Creative Writing. In her second quarter in the winter of 1960 she enrolled in the first of the four creative writing courses she would complete in her years at Northwestern. In the ensuing three years she would complete her Creative Writing Major while also fulfilling her requirements for the English major by the spring of 1963.

In the spring of 1962 she published her first short story, Loss, and was later awarded the J Scott Clark prize for excellence in creative writing. Her writing agenda included a curated fiction writing class with visiting writer and poet Stephen Spender in her senior year. Along with these activities she was also a member of the Speakers Committee of the then widely known annual Northwestern University Symposium, hosting and introducing such writers as Saul Bellows and Theodore Roethke. She was also student editor of the Tri-Quarterly magazine and invited into Phi Beta Kappa in her junior year.

In her senior year, due to recurring family problems at home, Susan received permission to leave Northwestern at the end of the winter quarter in March 1963. Having already fulfilled all the credits necessary for her to graduate with her B.A degree, she went home to Skaneateles to take care of her mother and younger siblings, later graduating in absentia with honors in June 1963.

By then Kenney had been awarded a Wilson Foundation Graduate Fellowship for her first post graduate year and was also honored with a New York State Regents Fellowship.

She had already been accepted at Cornell University Graduate School but held off until things settled down at home and took a summer job as a writer-editor for the Department of the Interior in Washington D.C. In August 1963 she decided to take up on her graduate school scholarship offers and enrolled in Cornell University Graduate School of Literature and the Arts, where she went on to earn an M.A, and Ph.D. in English and American Literature (medieval literature, Sixteenth-Twentieth century prose fiction and poetry.

During her time there she was a teaching assistant for five different professors, taught first year English classes and tutored undergraduate students. served as a library researcher and assistant for writer Alison Lurie, Kenney also met her graduate committee chair and longtime advisor Professor James McConkey who along with Lurie would become her close friends, supporters and mentors for the next five decades. In her graduate school classes, Susan focused on widening her knowledge of literary history, studying through decades and genres of literature, prose and poetry, literary criticism, works from past and present times that would later be reflected in her own writing. In 1967 Susan was awarded a Wilson Dissertation Fellowship for her fifth year, allowing her to complete her doctoral dissertation about the author Virginia Woolf, an interest she would continue to pursue well into her academic career. After an eight-year hiatus, with McConkey and Lurie’s encouragement Susan turned back to writing fiction with her short story “Mirrors” published in EPOCH magazine in the 1975 Fall issue. (Volume XXV Number 1.).

== Academic career ==
After earning her M.A. and Ph.D from Cornell, in 1968 Kenney joined the faculty at Colby College in Waterville, Maine in 1968, rising to the rank of full professor as she taught English and American literature, fiction and other creative writing for more than thirty years. In 1993 she was honored with the Charles A. Dana Professor of Creative Writing Chair, retiring as Emeritus in 2007. At several periods in her career she served as director of the college’s Creative Writing Program, teaching classes and mentoring students as well as sharing executive duties, such as coordinating the Visiting Writers series, introducing guest writers and other responsibilities. In the 90s she also served a three year term as the Chair of the Humanities Division.

== Writing career ==
Kenney first gained widespread attention with the award-winning novel In Another Country (Viking Hardcover, Penguin Contemporary Authors paperback), which consists of six interwoven stories chronicling the life of Sara Boyd and her family. The novel explores Boyd’s experiences of loss and crisis, including the sudden death of her father, her mother’s recurring mental breakdowns, and her husband’s life-threatening illness. The work was honored with the Quality Paperback Book Club New Voices Award and has appeared in multiple editions, including hardcover, paperback, large print, and book club editions. She continued the Boyd family story in the sequel Sailing, which follows Sara and her husband Phil as they confront successive crises, highlighting contrasting responses to fear and adversity and exploring themes of perseverance, hope, and emotional endurance. Kenney also authored the novella Escape, which examines Sara’s teenage years and her understanding of her mother’s past, providing a narrative bridge to the events depicted in In Another Country.

In addition to her literary fiction, Kenney has established a reputation in mystery fiction with the Roz Howard/Alan Stewart series. The series begins with Garden of Malice, in which English professor Roz Howard investigates a series of sabotages and potential murders on the estate of Lady Viola Montfort-Snow, navigating the eccentricities of residents and dangerous botanical knowledge. The second installment, Graves in Academe, depicts Roz confronting a serial killer at Canterbury College whose murders parallel events in literature, blending academic scholarship with suspenseful investigation. The third book, One Fell Sloop, follows Roz and Alan Stewart as they encounter a suspicious death while sailing off the coast of Maine, engaging in a complex “locked-room” style mystery. Kenney also published the shorter mystery Aunt Agatha Leaving, in which Roz solves a decades-old case during a sailing excursion, reviewed as the most popular work in Goodreads. The Roz Howard series was initially published in hardcover and paperback editions, and though these titles are now out of print all of them can be found online.

Kenney has also contributed non-fiction works to several anthologies, including “Fragments: A Portrait of My Father” memoir reconstructing her father’s life up to age 48, from photographs, letters, and other surviving artifacts following his sudden death, published in Carolyn Anthony’s Family Portraits: Remembrances by Twenty Distinguished Writers.

This work exemplifies Susan’s sensitivity to personal loss and her skill in capturing the emotional nuances of family and memory, her versatility demonstrated across genres, combining literary introspection with the precision and ingenuity of mystery writing. Her work has been recognized for its strong character development, emotional resonance, and thoughtful exploration of both ordinary and extraordinary human experiences, establishing her as a distinctive voice in contemporary American literature.

=== Critical writing ===
For decades, Kenney also wrote reviews and essays for The New York Times Book Review, Newsday, Down East Magazine, The Boston Globe and others, covering genres from books for children to fiction and nonfiction by contemporary authors, contributing to literary discourse. She also continued for decades to contribute articles on Virginia Woolf’s life and work in literary journals such the University of Toronto Quarterly and The Massachusetts Review.

These activities coalesced with her stories and novels into the recently recognized genre of autobiographical fiction, carrying on the dialogue regarding her work and life.

== Themes and reception ==
Kenney’s fiction often explores relationships, mortality, memory, and the interplay between personal identity and external circumstance. Her longer fiction has been reviewed in national press outlets; for example, In Another Country received attention in the Must Reads section of Time Magazine, highlighting the emotional depth and interconnected narrative structure of her work. Both In Another Country and Sailing received featured reviews in The New York times Book Review, The Philadelphia Inquirer and other newspapers and magazines, including People.

Beyond academia and fiction writing, Kenney has remained active in the literary community. She has served as a judge for nationwide writing contests such as the National Book Awards and Sara Josepha Hale Awards, judged entries alongside other award‑winning authors and helped to encourage young writers throughout the country.

== Personal life ==
Kenney was married in 1964 to Edwin J. Kenney, Jr, a Professor of English at Colby College until his death in 1992. The couple had two children, a son and a daughter. She later married Anthony J. Corrado, a retired professor of government at Colby College. The couple resides in central Maine, where Kenney continues to write and engage in literary activities.

== Awards ==
- National Merit Scholarship Finalist 1958
- J. Scott Clark Creative Writing Prize, Northwestern University1962
- Phi Beta Kappa Junior year Northwestern University 1962
- Woodrow Wilson Fellowship 1963
- New York State Regents Graduate Fellowship 1964
- Woodrow Willson Dissertation Fellowship 1967
- O. Henry Award: First Prize Story for "Facing Front" 1982
- National Endowment for the Arts Fellowship in Creative Writing, 1983–1984
- New Voice Literary Award, In Another Country,1985
- 1985: American Library Association Notable Books of the Year, 1985
- New York Times Notable Paperback of the Year, for Sailing 1989
- Escape, a Novella” special Mention in Pushcart Prize Awards 2005

== Works ==
=== Novels ===
- Garden of Malice. Penguin Group USA. 1992. ISBN 978-0-14-016966-9.
- In Another Country, novel, Viking,1984; Quality Paperback Book club edition,1984, Penguin paperback,1985. British hard and softcover editions, large print, Swedish, Danish, and Dutch editions.
- Graves in Academe. Penguin Books. 1986. ISBN 978-0-14-009386-5.
- Sailing, novel, Viking, April 1988: Literary Guild edition, 1988, Penguin paperback,1989. large print, Swedish and Danish editions, l991.
- One Fell Sloop. Viking. 1990. ISBN 978-0-670-83537-9.

=== Short stories ===
- “Loss,” Northwestern Tri-Quarterly, Volume 4 Spring Number three, 1962.
- “Mirrors,” Epoch, Fall 1975. Epoch, Volume XXV, Number 1.
- “The Birthday Party,” McCall’s, March 1978.
- “Facing Front,” Epoch Winter, 1980, Volume XXIX Number 2 ( reprinted in Prize Stories: The O. Henry Awards 1982).
- “Precious Moments,” McCall’s, April 1982.
- “Sailing,” The Hudson Review, Fall 1982; nominated for the General Electric-CCLM Young Writers Prizes,1982.
- “A Place I’ve Never Been,” The Hudson Review, Winter, 1984.
- “In Another Country.” Boston Globe Magazine, February 10, 1984.
- “Hallways,” longer version of earlier story, Ladies Home Journal, July 1984.
- “The Death of the Dog and Other Rescues,” Epoch, Spring-Summer, 1984: Volume XXXIII Number 2
- “In Case You Don’t Come Back,” The Hudson Review, Summer, 1985.
- “The Last Birthday Cake, Family Circle, October 4, 1985.
- “The Well,” McCall’s, September 1986.
- “Nativity,” Ladies Home Journal, December 1986.
- “Sailing,” revised version of earlier story, Boston Globe Magazine, November 22, 1987.
- “The Checkup,” Redbook, February 1988.
- “The Idea of Boats,” TheYacht, Summer l988
- “The Most Beautiful Woman in the World,” short story/memoir, Boston Globe Magazine, May 17, l992.
- “Murder in the Wind,” Lombard Marketing, January l993: a short mystery story that forms the basis for a jigsaw puzzle.
- “The 50 Percent Solution,” a spoof mystery story serialized in Colby Magazine, Waterville, ME, 1998
- “Aunt Agatha Leaving,” Malice Domestic8, New York: Avon Books, 1999
- “Escape: A Novella,” Epoch, Volume 54, Number 1 2005 Series.
- “How We Leave Her,” Epoch, Vol 63. Number 3, 2014 Series.

=== Stories in Anthologies ===
- “The Shadow Child,” in The Eloquent Edge, edited by Margery Wilson and Kathleen Lignell, Acadia Pub. Co. 1990. Collection nominated for Pushcart Prize, 1990.
- “The Death of the Dog and Other Rescues,” reprinted in Companion Pieces, ed. Michael Rosen, Doubleday, 1990.
- Mirrors,” reprinted in English as a Second Language Reader’s Anthology, 1991.
- “Fragments: A Portrait of My Father,” memoir, in Family Portraits, ed. Carolyn Anthony, Doubleday & Co., October 1989.. Collection as a whole cited in Best American Essays,1990.
- “For Those in Peril on the Sea: A Meditation,” autobiographical essay in The Quotable Moose, ed. Wesley McNair, Hanover, NH: University of New England Press, 1994.
- “Ringing the Net.” autobiographical sketch in Between Friends, ed. Mickey Pearlman, New York: Houghton Mifflin, 1994.
- “A House of Books: My Book House,” personal essay in The Most Wonderful Books, an anthology of essays about childhood reading edited by Michael Dorris and Emily Buchwald, (Milkweed Editions, 1997).
- “A Fool for Pasta Fazool,” autobiographical sketch in From The Finger Lakes: A Memoir Anthology edited by Edward Hower and Jack Hooper, Cayuga Lakes Books, 2021.
- “Toledo,” autobiographical sketch in Breaking Bread, Essays from New England on Food, Hunger, and Family edited by Debra Spark and Deborah J. Corey, Boston MA Beacon Books 2022.

=== Scholarly articles, papers, essays, introductions ===
- “Why did Virginia Woolf Commit Suicide?” a paper delivered to the Cornell University Group for Applied Psychoanalysis, January 1972.
- “A Room of One’s Own Revisited: Women in Literature,” University of Michigan Papers in Women’s Studies, Vol. 1, no. 2 Summer 1974.
- “Why wasn’t Virginia Woolf Analyzed?” a paper delivered to the Cornell University Group for Applied Psychoanalysis, April 1975.
- “Two Endings: Virginia Woolf’s Suicide and “Between the Acts.” University of Toronto Quarterly, Vol. XLIV, No. 4 Summer 1975, 265-289.
- “Virginia Woolf’s Madness and her Fiction,” a Mellon Lecture given at Colby College, November 19, 1975.
- "Virginia Woolf and The Art of Madness," (with E. J. Kenney, Jr.) The Massachusetts Review, Spring 1982.“Editing The Palimpsestic Text: The Case Of Virginia Woolf’s A Sketch Of The Past “by Elizabeth A. Shih and Susan M. Kenney: article in Virginia Woolf In The Real World: Selected Papers From The 13^{th} International Conference On Virginia Woolf: edited by Karen Kukil, Clemson University Press, Clemson, South Carolina 2005.

=== Introductions and copyedited works ===
Susan also copy-edited and wrote introductions for stories in The Garland Library of Children’s stories: Classics of Children's Literature 1621-1932, collection of 117 titles reprinted in photo -facsimile in 73 volumes, selected and arranged by Alison Lurie and Justin G. Schiller, 1976:

- Preface to Charlotte M. Yonge's The Daisy Chain,
- Biographical note to Lewis Carroll’s “Rhyme? and Reason?,
- Preface to Juliana Ewing's Mrs. Overtheway's Remembrances,

=== Book reviews ===
- “Growing Up a Winner,” review of Ramona Forever, by Beverly Cleary, New York Times Book Review, (NYTBR) November 11, 1984.
- “Paradise with Snake,” review of Annie John, a novel by Jamaica Kincaid, NYTBR, April 7, 1985.
- “The Agatha Puzzle Made Clear,” review of Agatha Christie, A Biography by Janet Morgan, Boston Sunday Globe, June 9, 1985.
- Review of four children’s books: “Moon Tiger, The Night Flight, A Winter Journey, Winter Magic,” NYTBR, November 17, 1985.
- “Inside the Real Maine?” essay-review of Inside Vacationland: New Fiction from the Real Maine, Down East Magazine, Special Issue, January 1986.
- “Return of the Comet Man,” review of I Been There Before, a novel by David Carkeet, NYTBR, January 26, 1986.
- “Beacon Blanket Book Bag,” review of The Funeral Makers, a novel by Cathi Pelletier, NYTBR, June 1, 1986.
- “The Not-Just-Anybody Family,” by Betsey Byars, NYTBR, June 15, 1986.
- “A Client Called Noah,” by Josh Greenfeld, Front page review of NYTBR, February 6, 1987.
- “Looking for Doctor Right,” review of Doctors and Women, a novel by Susan Cheever, NYTBR, December 6, 1987.
- “‘Following My Own Bent,'” review of Onward and Upward: a Biography of Katherine S. White, by Linda H. Davis, Down East Magazine, September 1987.
- “The Family That Forgot Christmas,” review of Tidings, a novel by William Wharton, NYTBR, December 6, 1987.
- “Three Maine Mysteries,” essay-review, Down East Magazine, July 1988.
- Silver, review of a novel by Hilma Wolitzer, Newsday, July 7, 1988.
- “What Happened at the Mall,” review of In the Heart of the Whole World, a novel by John Rolfe Gardiner, NYTBR, October 2, 1988.
- “Eat Your Nice Maggots, Herbert,” review of The Grotesque, a novel by Patrick McGrath, NYTBR, May 28, 1989.
- Man Meets Boat Meets Hurricane,” review of Spartina, a novel by John Casey, NYTBR, June 25, 1989.
- “Fall River Legends,” review of What We Had by James Chace, NYTBR, June 17, 1990.
- “Golf? Transcendental?” review of The Lies Boys Tell, a novel by Lamar Herrin, NYTBR, October 20, 1991.
- “‘I’m One of the Ones It Was Done To!'” review of Violence, a novel by Richard Bausch, NYTBR, January 29, l992.
- Cold Times, a novel by Elizabeth Jordan Moore, Down East Magazine, Summer l992.
- “Holed up in the Roxy”, review of Kicking Tomorrow, a novel by Daniel Richler, NYTBR, September l992.
- “Love Among the Lobsters,” review of Blue Moon, a novel by Luanne Rice, NYTBR, September 12, l993.
- “Death Comes to the Professor,” review of Literary Murder, a novel by Batya Gur, NYTBR, December 26, l993.
- Sometimes a Great Ocean,” review of Alongshore, by John R. Stilgoe, NYTBR, July 3, l994.
- “Their Fellow Americans,” review of Snow Falling on Cedars, a novel by David Guterson, NYTBR, October 16, l994
- “Shades of Difference,” review of The Wedding, a novel by Dorothy West, NYTBR, February 12, l995
- “Gone Fishing,” review of Light Years, a memoir by Le Anne Schreiber, NYTBR, September 15, l996
- “Crimes of the Heart,” review of The Weight of Water, a novel by Anita Shreve, NYTBR, January 19, l999.
