= John Kenney =

John Kenney may refer to:

- John Kenney (baseball) (1844–1893), American baseball player
- W. John Kenney (1905–1992), Assistant Secretary of the United States Navy
- John A. Kenney Jr. (1914–2003), American dermatologist
- John A. Kenney Sr. (1874–1950), American surgeon and father of John Jr.
- John T. Kenney (1911–1972), English illustrator
- John Kenney, a contestant on the reality TV show Survivor: Vanuatu

== See also ==
- John Kenny (disambiguation)
