= Morristown, Minnesota =

City in Minnesota, United States

Morristown
- City
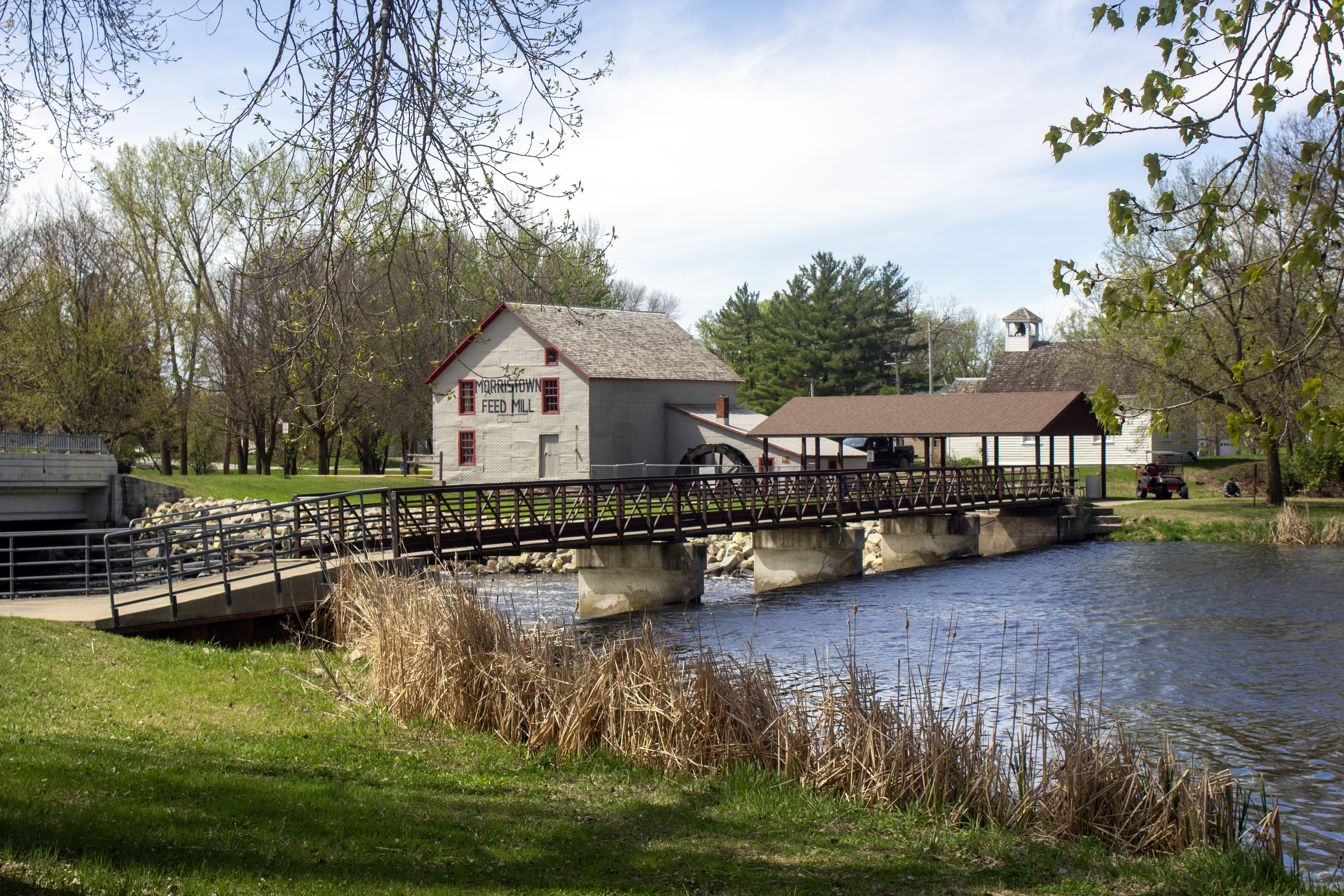
- Morristown Feed Mill
- Nickname: Heaven On Earth
- Motto: Best Town By A Dam Site
- Location of Morristown, Minnesota
- Coordinates: 44°13′27″N 93°26′42″W
- Country: United States
- State: Minnesota
- County: Rice
- Founded: 1855
- Incorporated: 1874

Government
  - Mayor: Tony Lindahl

Area
  - Total: 1.14 sq mi (2.96 km^{2})
  - Land: 1.14 sq mi (2.95 km^{2})
  - Water: 0 sq mi (0.00 km^{2})
- Elevation: 1,004 ft (306 m)

Population (2020)
  - Total: 949
  - Estimate (2022): 1,008
  - Density: 832.6/sq mi (321.46/km^{2})
- Time zone: UTC−6 (Central (CST))
  - Summer (DST): UTC−5 (CDT)
- ZIP code: 55052
- Area code: 507
- FIPS code: 27-44296
- GNIS feature ID: 2395412
- Sales tax: 7.375%
- Website: ci.morristown.mn.us

Morristown is a city in Rice County, Minnesota, United States. The population was 949 at the 2020 census.

== History ==
Morristown was platted in 1855, and named for Walter Morris, a pioneer settler.

== Geography ==
According to the United States Census Bureau, the city has a total area of 1.03 square miles (2.67 km^{2}); 1.02 square miles (2.64 km^{2}) is land and 0.01 square miles (0.03 km^{2}) is water.

Nearly the entirety of Morristown lies on the southern bank of the Cannon River.

Minnesota State Highway 60 serves as a main route in the community.

== Demographics ==
Historical population
Census	Pop.	Note	%±
1870	317		—
1880	517		63.1%
1890	517		0.0%
1900	589		13.9%
1910	592		0.5%
1920	688		16.2%
1930	613		−10.9%
1940	677		10.4%
1950	533		−21.3%
1960	616		15.6%
1970	659		7.0%
1980	639		−3.0%
1990	784		22.7%
2000	981		25.1%
2010	987		0.6%
2020	949		−3.9%
2022 (est.)	1,008		6.2%
U.S. Decennial Census; 2020 Census

=== 2010 census ===
As of the census of 2010, there were 987 people, 388 households, and 255 families living in the city. The population density was 967.6 inhabitants per square mile (373.6/km^{2}). There were 424 housing units at an average density of 415.7 per square mile (160.5/km^{2}). The racial makeup of the city was 96.3% White, 0.6% African American, 0.2% Asian, 0.9% from other races, and 2.0% from two or more races. Hispanic or Latino of any race were 3.6% of the population.

There were 388 households, of which 33.2% had children under the age of 18 living with them, 48.7% were married couples living together, 10.6% had a female householder with no husband present, 6.4% had a male householder with no wife present, and 34.3% were non-families. 26.8% of all households were made up of individuals, and 13.1% had someone living alone who was 65 years of age or older. The average household size was 2.49 and the average family size was 3.03.

The median age in the city was 37.8 years. 25.9% of residents were under the age of 18; 7.3% were between the ages of 18 and 24; 27.4% were from 25 to 44; 24.2% were from 45 to 64; and 15.4% were 65 years of age or older. The gender makeup of the city was 50.3% male and 49.7% female.

=== 2000 census ===
As of the census of 2000, there were 981 people, 363 households, and 258 families living in the city. The population density was 1,130.4 inhabitants per square mile (436.4/km^{2}). There were 374 housing units at an average density of 431.0 per square mile (166.4/km^{2}). The racial makeup of the city was 97.86% White, 0.10% African American, 0.51% Native American, 0.51% from other races, and 1.02% from two or more races. Hispanic or Latino of any race were 8.15% of the population.

There were 363 households, out of which 37.2% had children under the age of 18 living with them, 55.4% were married couples living together, 11.8% had a female householder with no husband present, and 28.9% were non-families. 24.8% of all households were made up of individuals, and 11.6% had someone living alone who was 65 years of age or older. The average household size was 2.65 and the average family size was 3.17.

In the city, the population was spread out, with 29.4% under the age of 18, 7.4% from 18 to 24, 32.2% from 25 to 44, 17.3% from 45 to 64, and 13.7% who were 65 years of age or older. The median age was 34 years. For every 100 females, there were 97.4 males. For every 100 females age 18 and over, there were 95.2 males.

The median income for a household in the city was $36,538, and the median income for a family was $41,382. Males had a median income of $29,375 versus $24,808 for females. The per capita income for the city was $15,762. About 7.7% of families and 10.8% of the population were below the poverty line, including 13.9% of those under age 18 and 10.7% of those age 65 or over.

== Education ==
Waterville-Elysian-Morristown School District operates public schools.

== Notable people ==
- Henry Waldo Coe, frontier physician and politician
- Seth H. Kenney, farmer and politician

== Gallery ==
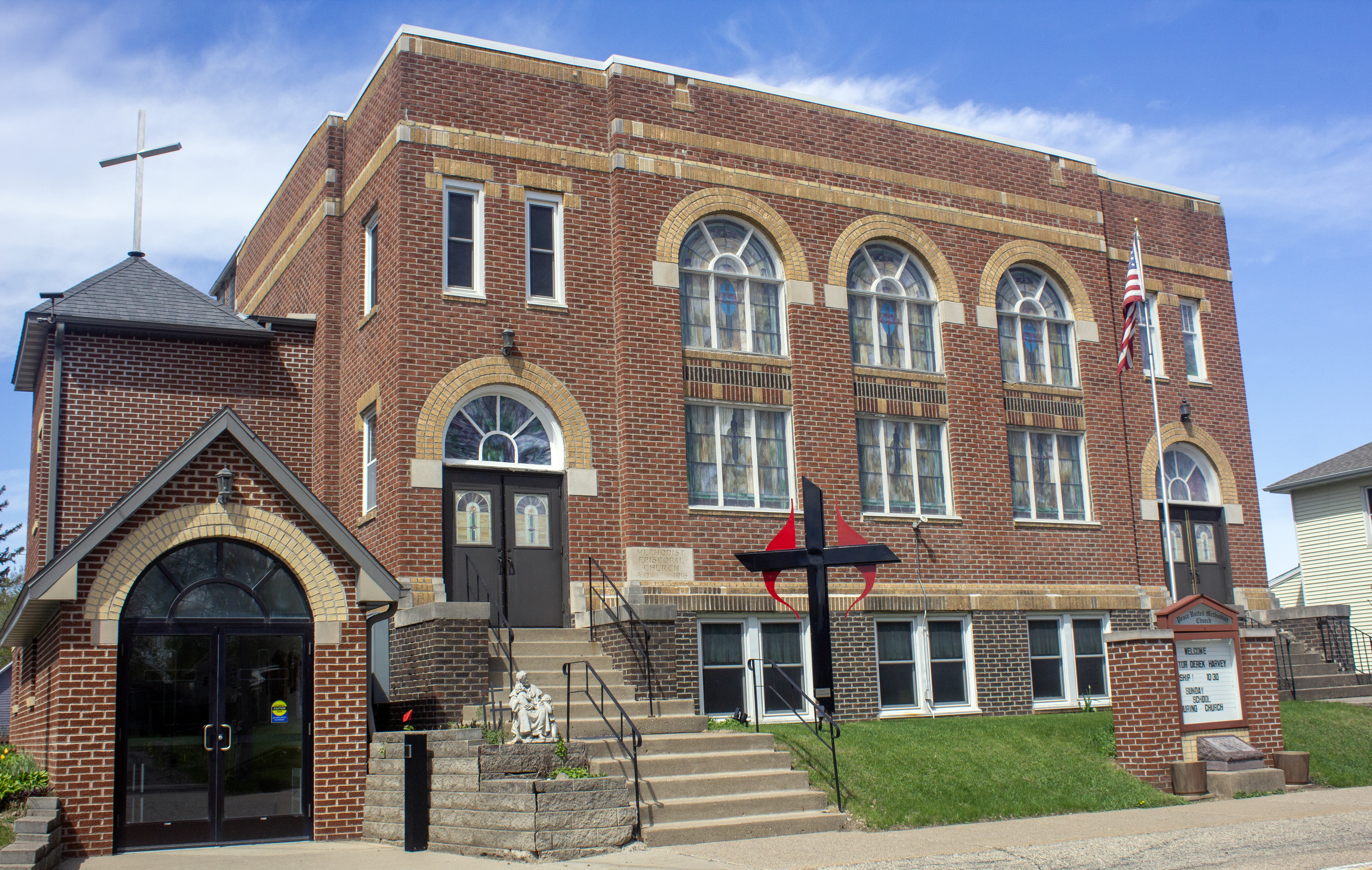
Peace United Methodist Church

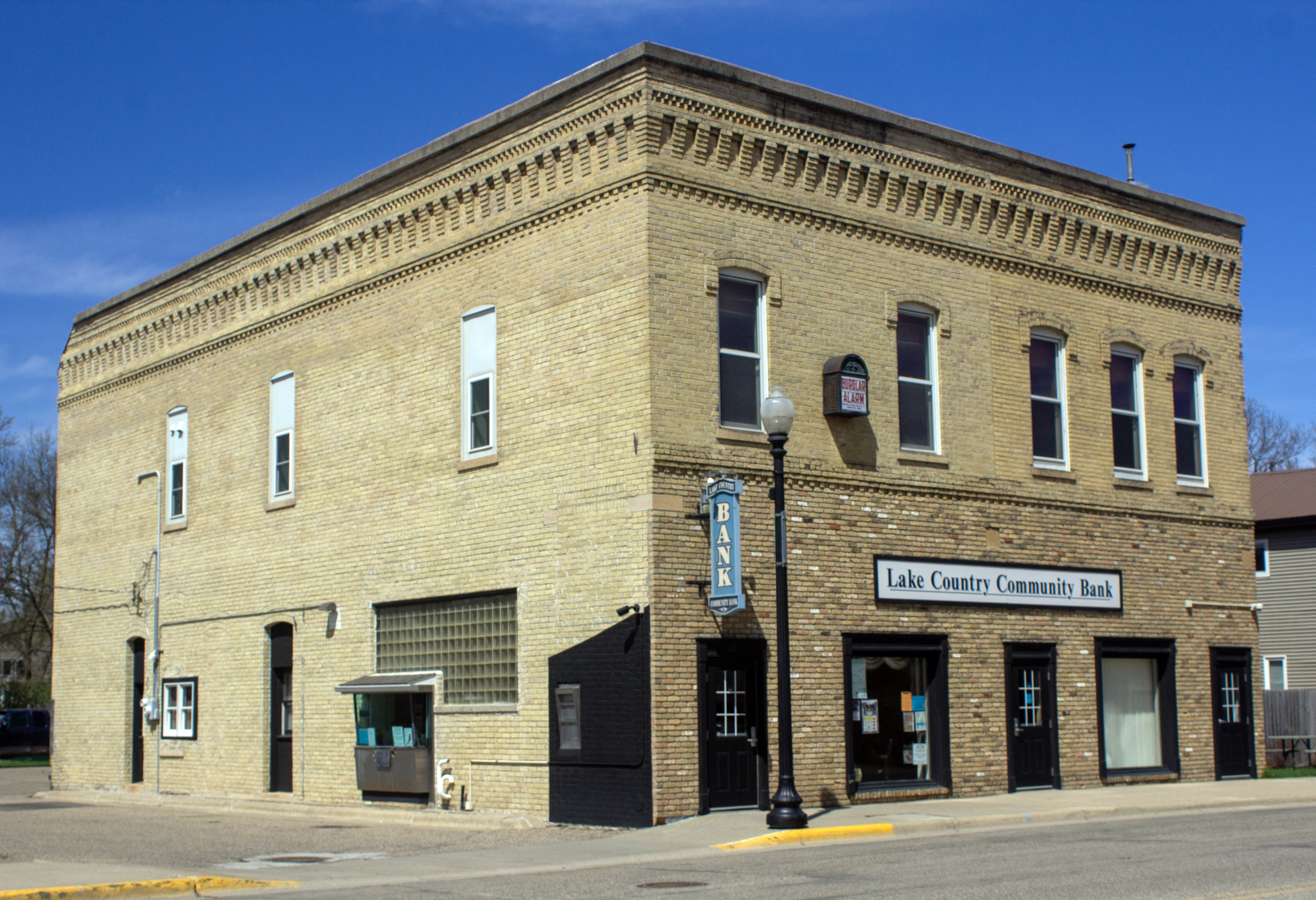
Lake Country Community Bank

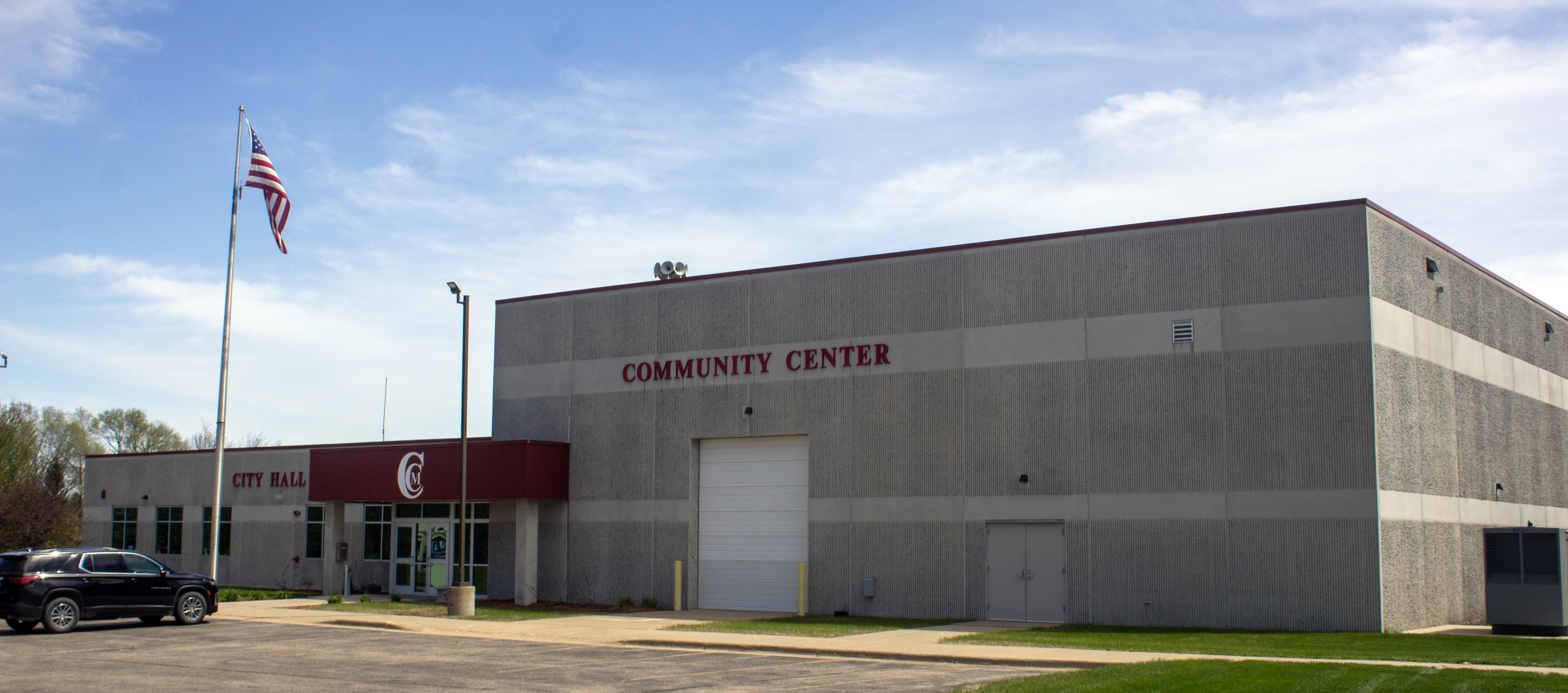
City Hall and Community Center

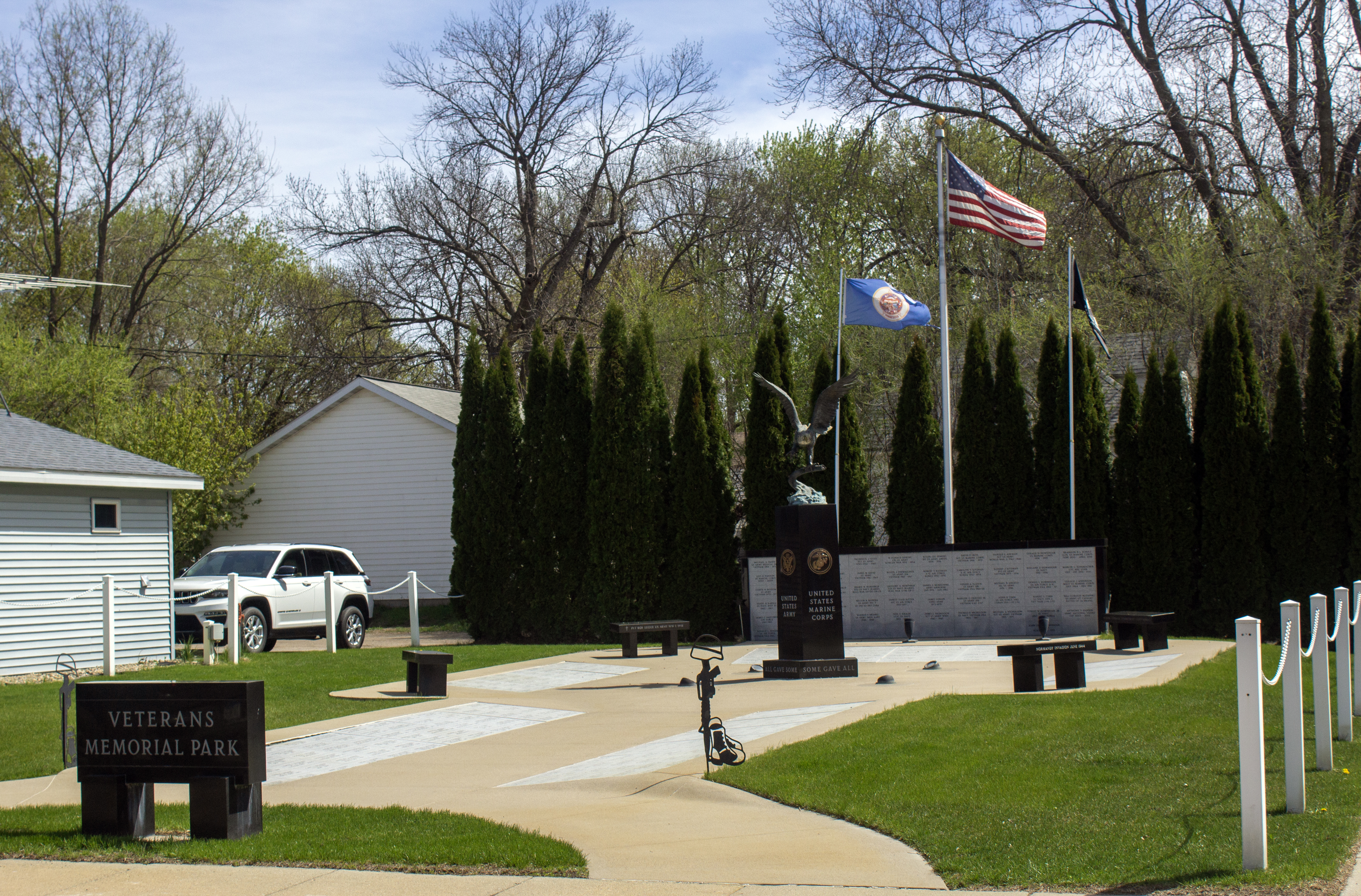
Veterans Memorial

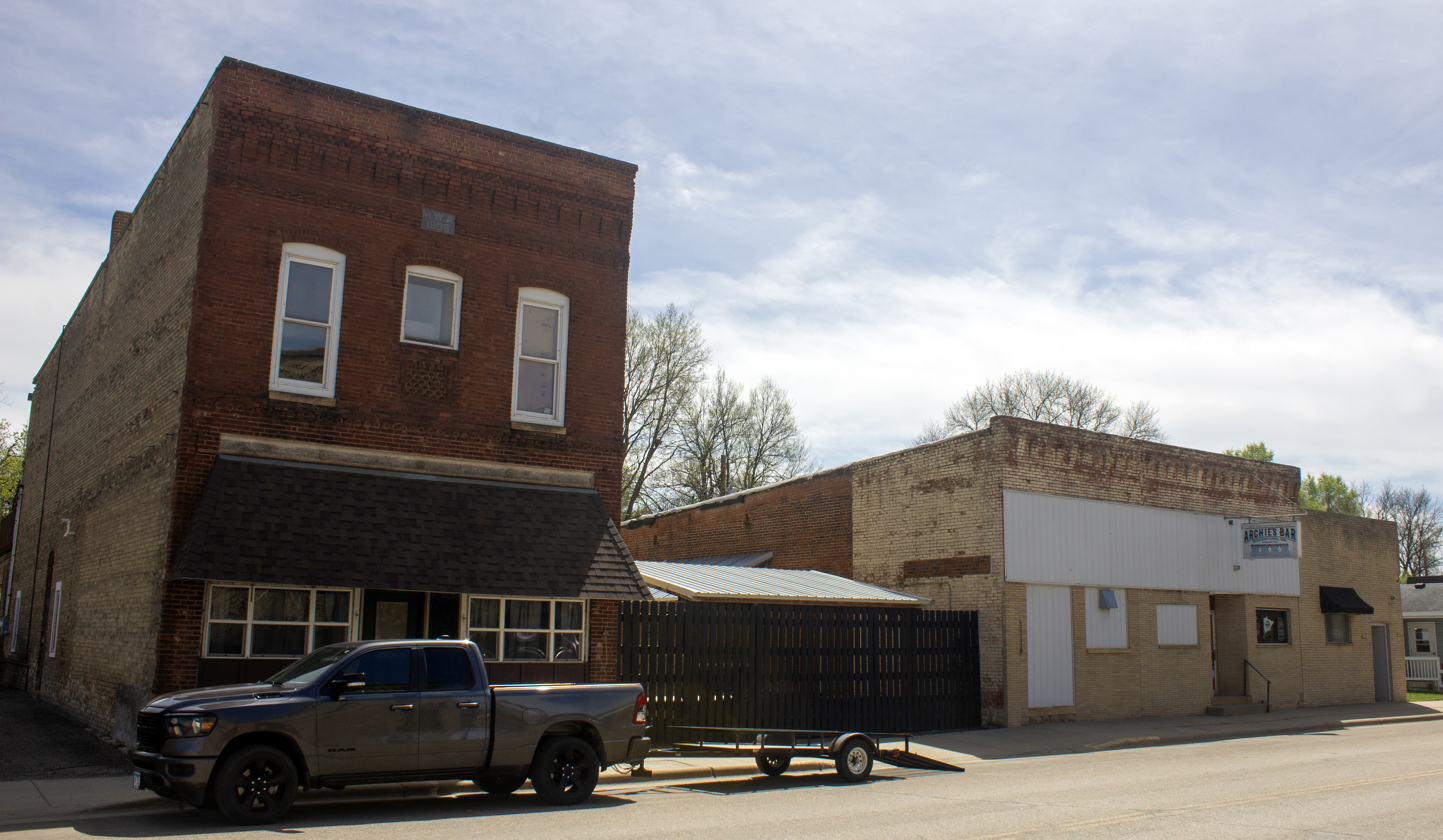
Division St. N. (east side)

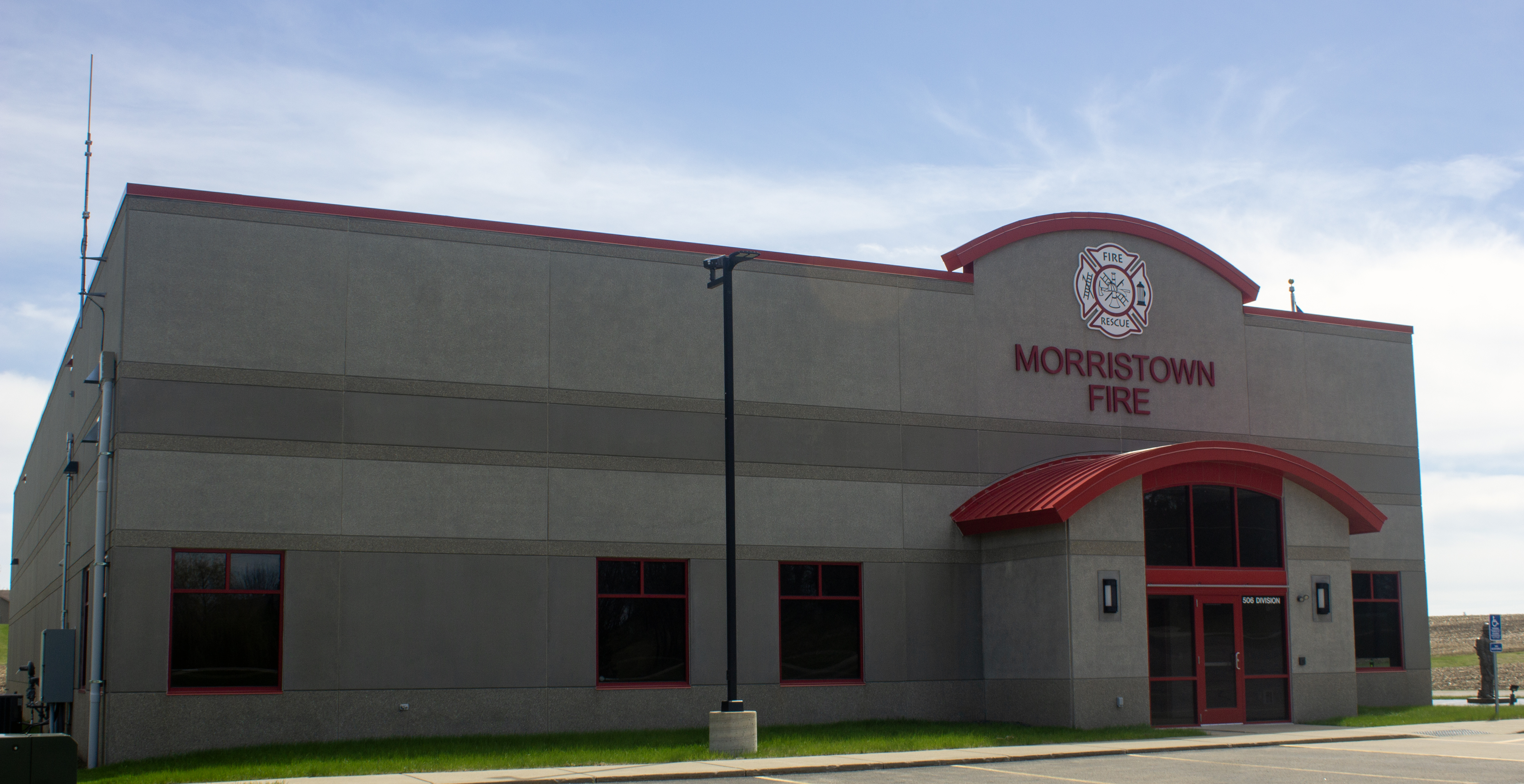
Fire Station
