= Elaine Anthony =

American mixed media painter

- Born: 1943; New York City, New York, U.S.
- Died: October 26, 1996 (aged 52–53); West Redding, Connecticut, U.S.
- Education: Rhode Island School of Design
- Known for: Painting
- Spouses: Pedro Sánchez de Movellán (m. 1964–1982) Bernard Wharton (m. 1991–1996)

Elaine Anthony (1943–1996) was an American mixed media painter. She was best known for her Black Mesa Series inspired by a spiritual journey of healing undertaken after being diagnosed with breast cancer in 1987. Her work became a mode of expression and empowerment, combined with lifestyle changes, that led her on a redemptive journey toward wellness. Subsequent popular bodies of work created by Anthony include Warrior Marriage Feast Series, Warrior Icon and Spirit Icon.

== Biography ==
Anthony was born in New York City, New York in 1943, to Jack Murray Anthony, a cartoonist for The New Yorker. She and her identical twin sister, Carol Anthony were raised in Connecticut. Anthony attended Stephens College in Columbia, Missouri. She completed a Bachelor of Fine Arts degree from Rhode Island School of Design in 1996.

In 1991, she received an award from the Pollock-Krasner Foundation. Her work was the subject of a retrospective in 1996, at the Neuberger Museum of Art in Purchase, New York.

In 1964, she married a Spanish architect, Pedro Sánchez de Movellán. She had lived in Mexico City for 20 years, her husband Sánchez de Movellán worked for the firm of Luis Barragan. In 1982, the marriage ended in divorce.

In 1991, Anthony married Bernard Wharton. Elaine Anthony died on October 29, 1996, in her home in West Redding, Connecticut, at the age of 53.
