= Richard Kenney =

Richard Kenney may refer to:

- Richard Kenney (poet) (born 1948), poet and professor of English
- Richard Kenney (missionary), first Church Missionary Society missionary to Bombay
- Richard R. Kenney (1856–1931), American lawyer and politician from Delaware
