= James Kenney =

James Kenney may refer to:

- Jim Kenney (born 1958), Philadelphia mayor
- James J. Kenney (1869–1916), fire chief in Berkeley, California
- James FitzGerald-Kenney (1878–1956), senior Irish politician
- James Kenney (dramatist) (1780–1849), British dramatist
- James Kenney (actor) (1930–1987), British actor in Expresso Bongo
- James A. Kenney III (born 1937), Maryland state court judge

== See also ==
- James Kenny (disambiguation)
