= Edward Kenney =

Edward Kenney may refer to:

- Edward A. Kenney (1884–1938), member of the United States House of Representatives from New Jersey
- Edward F. Kenney Sr. (1921–2006), American professional baseball executive
- E. J. Kenney (Edward John Kenney, 1924–2019), professor of Latin
- Edward Tourtellotte Kenney (1888–1974), politician in British Columbia, Canada
- Edward Patrick Kenney (1888–1976), Australian World War I flying ace
- Edward Kenney (cricketer) (1845–1916), English cricketer and educator
- Ed Kenney (1933–2018), singer/actor

== See also ==
- Edward Kenny (1800–1891), Canadian politician
- Edward Kenny, mayor of East Newark, New Jersey
