= Keaney =

Keaney is a surname. Notable people with the surname include:

- Brian Keaney, British author born in Walthamstow, East London
- Conal Keaney, Irish footballer and hurler
- Frank Keaney (1886–1967), college men's basketball coach
- Luke Keaney (born 1982), Irish Gaelic footballer
- Paul Keaney, MBE, ISO, formerly headmaster at Clontarf Orphanage

== See also ==
- Keaney Gymnasium, multi-purpose arena in Kingston, Rhode Island, USA
