= James Kenny (archdeacon) =

Irish Anglican priest

James Kenny was an Anglican priest.

Kenny educated at Trinity College, Dublin. He was Archdeacon of Kilfenora from 1790 until his death in 1822.
