= Tim Kenney =

American athletics administrator

Biographical details
- Education: University at Buffalo, Florida State University

Playing career
- 1988–1993: Buffalo
- Position: Swimming

Coaching career (HC unless noted)
- 1995–1996: Stony Brook (assistant)

Administrative career (AD unless noted)
- 1997–2004: Stony Brook (Assistant AD)
- 2004–2015: Massachusetts (Associate AD)
- 2015–2021: St. Bonaventure

Tim Kenney is an American college athletics administrator and former basketball coach. Kenney served as athletic director at St. Bonaventure University from 2015 to 2021. He previously served as assistant athletic director at Stony Brook University from 1997 to 2004, and as associate athletic director at the University of Massachusetts Amherst from 2004 to 2015. Kenney attended college at the University at Buffalo, where he was an All-American breaststroker on the Buffalo Bulls swimming team. Kenney credits his swimming career success to his mentor, Stewart ‘Clams’ Karp, who he trained with during his youth in Dix Hills, Long Island. Kenney later served as an assistant basketball coach on the Stony Brook Seawolves men's basketball team from 1995 to 1996, prior to beginning his career in athletic administration. Kenney was named athletic director at St. Bonaventure University on March 10, 2015. Kenney left St. Bonaventure on May 31, 2021, when his contract expired and was not renewed.
