= Vin Kenney =

Australian rules footballer

Personal information
- Full name: Vincent Paul Kenney
- Born: 30 June 1892; Flemington, Victoria
- Died: 8 August 1959 (aged 67); Melbourne, Victoria
- Original team: Christian Brothers / East Melbourne

Playing career^{1}
Years	Club	Games (Goals)
1912	Richmond	2 (0)
- ^{1} Playing statistics correct to the end of 1912.

Vincent Paul Kenney (30 June 1892 – 8 August 1959) was an Australian rules footballer who played with Richmond in the Victorian Football League (VFL).
