= Ken James (educator) =

American educator

T. Kenneth James was appointed as commissioner of the Arkansas Department of Education by Governor Mike Huckabee on March 1, 2004, effective May 3, 2004. Prior to his appointment, he served as the Superintendent of Schools in Fayette County Public Schools (Lexington, Kentucky]); Little Rock, Arkansas; Van Buren, Arkansas and Batesville, Arkansas. James also served as assistant superintendent for educational services with the Escondido Union High School District in Escondido, California.

James earned a Doctorate in educational administration and supervision from Northern Arizona University and the United States International University (now Alliant International University) in San Diego, California, in 1992. He received a master's degree in educational administration from Northern Arizona University and a Bachelor's degree from Arkansas State University.

James began his career in education in 1972 and has served as a classroom teacher, assistant principal, principal, coordinator of planning and assessment and assistant superintendent. His work in California provided him with experience in schools with large minority student populations.

He is active in the Arkansas Association of Educational Administrators, and has served as legislative chair of the curriculum committee. In 1998, he was selected as the Superintendent of the Year for the State of Arkansas. James has served as an officer or board member of several professional organizations, including Arkansas Curriculum and Instruction Administrators, Economics America and the Arkansas Association of Supervision and Curriculum Development. He presently serves on the University of Arkansas Educational Administration steering committee, the State Advisory Board on Reforming Education, and the AASA board of directors. He also has intimate knowledge about school assessment in the state, having served on the ACTAAP Administrative Testing Committee. On May 29, 2009, James announced his resignation as Commissioner of Education effective June 30, 2009.
