= Carol Anthony =

American artist (born 1943)

- Born: 1943 (age 82–83); New York City, New York
- Education: Stephens College, Rhode Island School of Design
- Known for: Sculpting, Painting
- Notable work: A Place of Inner Stillness

Carol Anthony (born 1943) is an American artist known for her sculptures and paintings. In the 1970s, she became famous for her cartoon-like figure, papier-mache sculptures. After 1978, her work became focused on paintings of still life and landscape genres. She is based in New Mexico.

== Early life ==
Anthony was born in New York City, New York in 1943, to Jack Murray Anthony, a cartoonist for The New Yorker. She and her identical twin sister, Elaine Anthony were raised in Connecticut. Anthony attended Stephens College, Missouri. Anthony graduated from Rhode Island School of Design (RISD), earning a Bachelor of Fine Arts degree in Painting in 1966.

== Career ==
In the 1970s, Anthony's papier-mache sculptures earned recognition and one is now in the permanent collection of the Smithsonian. She said the papier-mache was a tribute to her father. The Museum of Contemporary Crafts featured an exhibition of her three-dimensional figures.

By 1978, she stopped sculpting to focus on painting, particularly of still lifes and simple scenes. Her paintings are often made with layered oil pastel on gessoed, textured masonite. She creates ethereal light by using many thin applications of color in many layers. Her paintings and monotypes are represented in the permanent collections of the Smithsonian Institution, the Carnegie Institute, and the Hirshhorn Museum and Sculpture Garden among others.

In 2009 Anthony participated in the exhibition, Best of The West: Southwest, representing artists in the New Mexico.

Anthony has lived and worked in Connecticut, Washington state, and most recently, Santa Fe, New Mexico.
