= James A. Kenney III =

American judge (born 1937)

Judge of the Maryland Court of Special Appeals
- In office June 17, 1997 – March 26, 2007

Personal details
- Born: March 26, 1937 (age 88); Salisbury, Maryland, U.S.
- Education: Dickinson College; George Washington University
- Occupation: Judge

James A. Kenney III (born March 26, 1937, in Salisbury, Maryland) is a former judge of the Maryland Court of Special Appeals. He joined the court on June 17, 1997, and retired March 26, 2007.

Kenney graduated from Dickinson College in 1959 and the George Washington University Law School in 1963. He was an Assistant State's Attorney in St. Mary's County, Maryland, from 1964 to 1967, and is an adjunct associate professor of political science at St. Mary's College of Maryland.
