= Sean Kenney =

Sean Kenney may refer to:

- Sean Kenney (actor) (born 1944), American actor
- Sean Kenney (artist) (born 1976), New York–based artist

== See also ==
- Seán Kenny (disambiguation)
