= Con Kenney =

Australian rules footballer

Personal information
- Full name: Conrad A. Kenney
- Born: 21 June 1896
- Died: 17 February 1959 (aged 62)
- Original team: South Melbourne District
- Height: 179 cm (5 ft 10 in)

Playing career^{1}
Years	Club	Games (Goals)
1919	Melbourne	9 (5)
- ^{1} Playing statistics correct to the end of 1919.

Con Kenney (21 June 1896 – 17 February 1959) was an Australian rules footballer who played with Melbourne in the Victorian Football League (VFL).
