= Endorsements in the 1993 Progressive Conservative Party of Canada leadership convention =

Prior to the 1993 Progressive Conservative leadership election, the candidates received endorsements from sitting members of parliament representing the party.

== Summary of endorsements by Members of Parliament by province ==
Candidate		BC	AB	SK	MB	ON	QC	NB	NS	PE	NL	NT	YT	Total
Patrick Boyer	Members:	-	-	-	-	1	-	-	-	-	-	-	-	1
Kim Campbell	Members:	6	5	-	1	16	8	4	2	-	1	-	-	43
Jean Charest	Members:	1	4	2	2	10	15	1	2	-	1	-	-	38
Jim Edwards	Members:	-	6	-	1	6	2	-	-	-	-	-	-	15
Garth Turner	Members:	-	-	-	-	1	-	-	-	-	-	-	-	1
Unaffiliated	Members:	-	7	-	3	-	-	-	-	-	-	-	-	-

== Patrick Boyer ==
Members (1)

- Patrick Boyer (Etobicoke—Lakeshore, Ontario (ON))

Senators (0)

== Kim Campbell ==
Members (43)

- Edna Anderson (Simcoe Centre, ON) [Ottawa Citizen (Ott. Cit.), 06.10.93, C1]
- Ken Atkinson (St. Catharines, ON) [The Hamilton Spectator (Ham. Spec.), 04.03.93, A12]
- Bill Attewell (Markham, ON) [Toronto Star (Tor. Star), 03.17.93, A1]
- Perrin Beatty, (Wellington—Grey—Dufferin—Simcoe, ON) [KWR, 06.12.93, A10]
- Ross Belsher (Fraser Valley East, British Columbia (BC)) [Ott. Cit., 06.10.93, C1]
- Jean-Pierre Blackburn (Jonquière, Quebec (QC)) [Gaz., 06.05.93, B1]
- Pierre Blais (Bellechasse, QC) [KWR, 04.29.93, A6]
- Don Blenkarn (Mississauga South, ON) [Gaz., 06.13.93, A1]
- John Bosley (Don Valley West, ON) [Tor. Star, 06.08.93, A11]
- Kim Campbell (Vancouver Centre, BC)
- Mary Collins (Capilano—Howe Sound, BC) [Ham. Spec., 06.12.93, A13]
- Robert Corbett (Fundy—Royal, New Brunswick (NB)) [Tor. Star, 06.09.93, A13]
- Charles Deblois (Montmorency—Orléans, QC) [Edmonton Journal (Edm. Jou.), 03.20.93, G1]
- Suzanne Duplessis (Louis-Hébert, QC) [Vancouver Sun (Van. Sun), 03.05.93, A4]
- Benno Friesen (Surrey—White Rock—South Langley, BC) [Ott. Cit., 06.10.93, C1]
- Barbara Greene (Don Valley North, ON) [Tor. Star, 03.17.93, A1]
- Tom Hockin (London West, ON) (Wind. Star, 04.10.93, A3]
- Bob Horner (Mississauga West, ON) [Gaz., 05.29.93, B1]
- Jean-Guy Hudon (Beauharnois—Salaberry, QC) [Van. Sun, 03.05.93, A4]
- Ken Hughes (Macleod, Alberta (AB)) [Gaz., 06.13.93, A1]
- Monique Landry (Blainville—Deux-Montagnes, QC) [Tor. Star, 03.17.93, A1]
- Doug Lewis (Simcoe North, ON) [The Province (The Prov.), 06.13.93, A35]
- Gilles Loiselle (Langelier, QC) [The Prov., 06.13.93, A35]
- Shirley Martin (Lincoln, ON) [Ham. Spec., 04.03.93, A12]
- Marcel Masse (Frontenac, QC) [The Prov., 06.13.93, A35]
- Charles Mayer (Lisgar—Marquette, Manitoba (MB)) [Ott. Cit., 04.13.93, A3]
- Peter McCreath (South Shore, Nova Scotia (NS)) [Tor. Star, 06.09.93, A13]
- Walter McLean (Waterloo, ON) [KWR, 05.31.93, B1]
- Gerald Merrithew (Saint John, NB) [Tor. Star, 06.09.93, A13]
- Rob Nicholson (Niagara Falls, ON) [Ham. Spec., 04.03.93, A12]
- Ross Reid (St. John's East, NF) [Ott. Cit., 04.13.93, A3]
- John Reimer (Kitchener, ON) [KWR, 05.21.93, A10]
- Lee Richardson (Calgary Southeast, AB) [Edm. Jou., 06.10.93, A3]
- Larry Schneider (Regina—Wascana, Saskatchewan (SK)) [Van. Sun, 03.05.93, A4]
- Tom Siddon (Richmond, BC) [Van. Sun, 03.05.93, A4]
- Bobbie Sparrow (Calgary Southwest, AB) [Ott. Cit., 06.10.93, C1]
- Ross Stevenson (Durham, ON) [Tor. Star, 03.17.93, A1]
- Blaine Thacker (Lethbridge, AB) [Van. Sun, 03.05.93, A4]
- Greg Thompson (Carleton—Charlotte, NB) [Tor. Star, 06.09.93, A13]
- Scott Thorkelson (Edmonton—Strathcona, AB) [Gaz., 06.13.93, A1]
- Bernard Valcourt (Madawaska—Victoria, NB) [The Prov., 06.13.93, A35]
- Stan Wilbee (Delta, BC) [Ott. Cit., 06.10.93, C1]
- Michael Wilson (Etobicoke Centre, ON) [Van. Sun, 05.11.93, C14]

Senators (3)

- Norm Atkins [Gaz., 05.29.93, B1]
- Mario Beaulieu [Tor. Star, 03.09.93, A9]
- Lowell Murray [Gaz., 05.29.93, B1]

== Jean Charest ==
Members (38)

- Gilles Bernier (Beauce, QC) [Cal. Her., 04.26.93, B5]
- Gabrielle Bertrand (Brome—Missisquoi, QC) [Tor. Star, 03.18.93, A13]
- Bud Bird (Fredericton, NB) [Tor. Star, 06.09.93, A13]
- Pauline Browes (Scarborough Centre, ON) [Ott. Cit., 05.30.93, A6]
- Pierre Cadieux (Vaudreuil, QC) [Gaz., 06.12.93, A1]
- Bill Casey (Cumberland—Colchester, NS) [Van. Sun, 04.07.93, A5]
- Jean Charest (Sherbrooke, QC)
- Joe Clark (Yellowhead, AB) [Gaz., 06.08.93, B1]
- Lee Clark (Brandon—Souris, MB) [Ott. Cit., 06.10.93, C1]
- Terry Clifford (London—Middlesex, ON) [Ott. Cit., 06.13.93, A2]
- Jean Corbeil (Anjou—Rivière-des-Prairies, QC) [DN, 05.11.93, 12]
- Robert de Cotret (Berthier—Montcalm, QC) [KWR, 06.12.93, A10]
- John Crosbie (St. John's West, NF) [Ott. Cit., 06.13.93, A2]
- Stan Darling (Parry Sound—Muskoka, ON) Gaz., 05.22.93, A11
- Vincent Della Noce (Duvernay, QC) [Tor. Star, 03.09.93, A9]
- Gabriel Desjardins (Drummond, QC) [Tor. Star, 03.09.93, A9]
- Dorothy Dobbie (Winnipeg South, MB) [Van. Sun, 06.11.93, A4]
- Darryl Gray (Bonaventure—Îles-de-la-Madeleine, QC) [Gaz., 04.26.93, A1]
- Jean-Guy Guilbault (Témiscamingue, QC) [Tor. Star, 03.09.93, A9]
- Lenard Gustafson (Souris—Moose Mountain, SK) [Fin. Post, 03.20.93, 5]
- Andre Harvey (Chicoutimi, QC) [KWR, 05.04.93, A9]
- Jim Hawkes (Calgary West, AB) [Gaz., 06.13.93, A1]
- Otto Jelinek (Oakville—Milton, ON) [Tor. Star, 06.09.93, A13]
- Al Johnson (Calgary North, AB) [Ott. Cit., 06.10.93, C1]
- Fernand Jourdenais (La Prairie, QC) [Tor. Star, 03.09.93, A9]
- Robert Layton (Lachine—Lac-Saint-Louis, QC) [Cal. Her., 03.17.93, A1]
- Elmer MacKay (Central Nova, NS) [Ott. Cit., 04.13.93, A3]
- Arnold Malone (Crowfoot, AB) [Gaz., 06.12.93, A1]
- John McDermid (Brampton, ON) [Ott. Cit., 06.13.93, A2]
- Barbara McDougall (St. Paul's, ON) [KWR, 04.29.93, A6]
- Bill McKnight (Kindersley—Lloydminster, SK) [Ott. Cit., 06.10.93, C1]
- Gus Mitges (Bruce—Grey, ON) [Tor. Star, 06.09.93, A13]
- Ken Monteith (Elgin, ON) [Edm. Jou., 05.29.93, A3]
- Guy St-Julien (Abitibi, QC) Ott. Cit., 06.11.93, A5
- Geoff Scott (Hamilton—Wentworth, ON) [KWR, 06.02.93, A10]
- Pat Sobeski (Cambridge, ON) [KWR, 05.07.93, B3]
- Monique Vézina (Rimouski—Témiscouata, QC) [Cal. Her., 04.26.93, B5]
- Robert Wenman (Fraser Valley West, BC) [Van. Sun, 05.15.93, A11]

Senators (2)

- Jim Kelleher [Tor. Star, 06.09.93, A13]
- Heath MacQuarrie [Ott. Cit., 05.30.93, A6]

== Jim Edwards ==
Members (15)

- Harry Brightwell (Perth—Wellington—Waterloo, ON) [Ott. Cit., 04.13.93, A3]
- Albert Cooper (Peace River, AB) [KWR, 06.11.93, A8]
- Bill Domm (Peterborough, ON) [Ott. Cit., 04.13.93, A3]
- Jim Edwards (Edmonton—Southwest, AB)
- Doug Fee (Red Deer, AB) [Edm. Jou, 06.10.93, A3]
- Girve Fretz (Erie, ON) [Ott. Cit., 04.13.93, A3]
- Marie Gibeau (Bourassa, QC) [Edm. Jou., 06.13.93, A3]
- Bruce Halliday (Oxford, ON) [Ott. Cit., 04.13.93, A3]
- Jean-Pierre Hogue (Outremont, QC) [Edm. Jou., 04.24.93, A3]
- Felix Holtmann (Portage—Interlake, MB) [Edm. Jou., 03.27.93, G1]
- Bill Kempling (Burlington, ON) [Ott. Cit., 04.13.93, A3]
- Brian O'Kurley (Elk Island, AB) [Edm. Jou., 04.16.93, A3]
- Robert Harold Porter (Medicine Hat, AB) [Edm. Jou., 03.27.93, G1]
- Walter Van De Walle (St. Albert, AB) [Edm. Jou., 03.27.93, G1]
- William Winegard (Guelph—Wellington, ON) [KWR, 05.01.93, B1]

Senators (3)

- John Buchanan [Edm. Jou., 04.24.93, A3]
- Mike Forrestall [Edm. Jou., 03.27.93, G1]
- Finlay MacDonald [Ott. Cit., 04.10.93, B3]

== Garth Turner ==
Members (1)

- Garth Turner (Halton-Peel, ON)

== Unaffiliated or Unknown ==
- Harvie Andre (Calgary Centre, AB)
- David Bjornson (Selkirk—Red River, MB)
- Benoît Bouchard (Roberval, QC)
- Lise Bourgault (Argenteuil—Papineau, QC)
- Murray Cardiff (Huron—Bruce, ON)
- Harry Chadwick (Brampton—Malton, ON)
- Andrée Champagne (Saint-Hyacinthe—Bagot, QC)
- Michel Champagne (Champlain, QC)
- Gilbert Chartrand (Verdun—Saint-Paul, QC)
- John Cole (York—Simcoe, ON)
- Yvon Côté (Richmond—Wolfe, QC)
- Clément Couture (Saint-Jean, QC)
- Howard Crosby (Halifax West, NS)
- Marcel Danis (Verchères, QC)
- Paul Dick (Lanark—Carleton, ON)
- Murray Dorin (Edmonton Northwest, AB)
- Jake Epp (Provencher, MB)
- Louise Feltham (Wild Rose, AB)
- Marc Ferland (Portneuf, QC)
- Gabriel Fontaine (Lévis, QC)
- John Fraser (Vancouver South, BC): Speaker.
- François Gérin (Mégantic—Compton—Stanstead, QC)
- Robert Hicks (Scarborough East, ON)
- Al Horning (Okanagan Centre, BC)
- Carole Jacques (Mercier, QC)
- Ken James (Sarnia—Lambton, ON)
- Jean-Luc Joncas (Matapédia—Matane, QC)
- Allan Koury (Hochelaga—Maisonneuve, QC)
- Charles Langlois (Manicouagan, QC)
- Gaby Larrivée (Joliette, QC)
- Willie Littlechild (Wetaskiwin, AB)
- Ricardo Lopez (Châteauguay, QC)
- David MacDonald (Rosedale, ON)
- John MacDougall (Timiskaming, ON)
- Charles-Eugène Marin (Gaspé, QC)
- Don Mazankowski (Vegreville, AB)
- Barry Moore (Pontiac—Gatineau—Labelle, QC)
- Brian Mulroney (Charlevoix, QC)
- Frank Oberle (Prince George—Peace River, BC)
- Steve Paproski (Edmonton North, AB)
- André Plourde (Kamouraska—Rivière-du-Loup, QC)
- Denis Pronovost (Saint-Maurice, Quebec)
- Alan Redway (Don Valley East, Ontario)
- Guy Ricard (Laval, Quebec)
- Jean-Marc Robitaille (Terrebonne, Quebec)
- Nicole Roy-Arcelin (Ahuntsic, Quebec)
- William C. Scott (Victoria—Haliburton, Ontario)
- Jack Shields (Athabasca, Alberta)
- René Soetens (Ontario, Ontario)
- Monique Tardif (Charlesbourg, Quebec)
- Jacques Tétreault (Laval-des-Rapides, Quebec)
- Marcel Tremblay (Québec-Est, Quebec)
- Maurice Tremblay (Lotbinière, Quebec)
- Bill Vankoughnet (Hastings—Frontenac—Lennox and Addington, Ontario)
- Jacques Vien (Laurentides, Quebec)
- Pierre H. Vincent (Trois-Rivières, Quebec)
- Gerry Weiner (Pierrefonds—Dollard, Quebec)
- Brian White (Dauphin—Swan River, Manitoba)
- Geoff Wilson (Swift Current—Maple Creek—Assiniboia, Saskatchewan)
- Dave Worthy (Cariboo—Chilcotin, British Columbia)

See also

- Progressive Conservative Party of Canada leadership convention, 1993
