= Senator Kenney =

Senator Kenney or Kenny may refer to:

- Bill Kenney (born 1955), Missouri State Senate
- Joseph Kenney (born 1960), New Hampshire State Senate
- Richard R. Kenney (1856–1931), U.S. Senator from Delaware from 1897 to 1901
- Bernard Kenny (born 1946), New Jersey State Senate
- Robert W. Kenny (1901–1976), California State Senate
