= Arthur Robert Kenney-Herbert =

Soldier and cook

- Born: Arthur Robert Kenney; 17 August 1840; Bourton-on-Dunsmore, Warwickshire, UKGBI
- Died: 5 March 1916 (aged 75); West Kensington
- Occupations: Soldier, cook
- Relatives: Arthur Henry Kenney (grandfather)

Arthur Robert Kenney-Herbert (née Kenney; 17 August 1840 – 5 March 1916) was a British soldier who served in the British Indian Army, and wrote on cooking.

== Early life and education ==
Kenney-Herbert was born Arthur Robert Kenney on 17 August 1840 in Bourton-on-Dunsmore, Warwickshire to The Rev Arthur Robert Kenney, the rector of Bourton-on-Dunsmore, and Mary Louise Kenney (née Palmer). Kenney-Herbert was the paternal grandson of Arthur Henry Kenney, an Irish religious writer and Dean of Achonry.

In 1855, Kenney-Herbert entered Rugby School as Arthur Robert Kenney. The families' surname was later changed to Kenney-Herbert after his father's mother, Mary Lusinda Kenney (née Herbert). Through his paternal grandmother, Kenney-Herbert was related to the Anglo-Irish politicians Henry Arthur Herbert and Colonel Henry Arthur Herbert and the Royal Navy officer Thomas Herbert.

== Career ==
He served in the Indian Army from age 19. A cornet in 1859, he served in the Madras Cavalry, having arrived in India on 31 October of that year. He reached the rank of major in 1875, at this rank serving as deputy assistant quartermaster general at Madras until 1881, then as military secretary to the governor of Madras from 1881 to 1884. In 1885, he was promoted to lieutenant-colonel in the Madras Cavalry. He retired in 1892 with the rank of colonel.

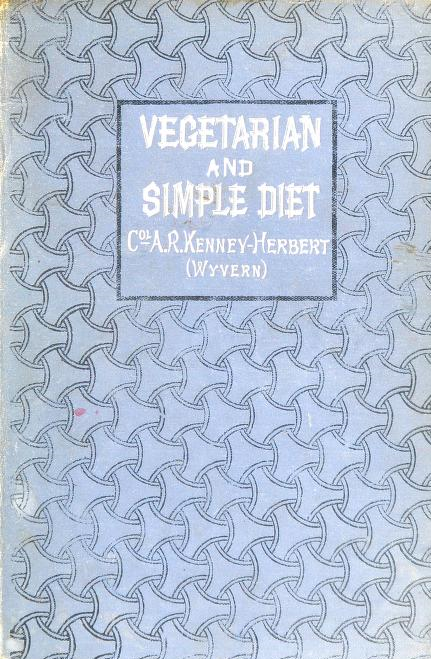
Kenney-Herbert's Vegetarian and Simple Diet, 1908

Kenney-Herbert wrote regular articles about Anglo-Indian cookery for The Madras Mail, Madras Atheneum and The Daily News, using the pen-name Wyvern. These were collected and published in 1878 as Culinary Jottings for Madras, Or, A Treatise in Thirty Chapters on Reformed Cookery for Anglo-Indian Exiles, which went through six editions between 1878 and 1892. Upon retiring from the army and returning to England, he started a cookery school – the Common-sense Cookery Association – in June 1894. Its premises were at 17 Sloane Street in London.

Kenney-Herbert was not a vegetarian, but he did author the cookbook Vegetarian and Simple Diet in 1904. The book espouses ovo-lacto vegetarian recipes. It was positively reviewed in The Lancet journal, which noted that "we are glad to welcome the appearance of a book which will teach householders that appetising dishes can be made from vegetables with the aid of eggs and milk products."

Kenney-Herbert was fond of kedgeree. His recipe consisted of boiled rice, chopped boiled egg, cold minced fish that is heated with herbs, pepper and salt.

== Personal life ==
He married Agnes Cleveland, daughter of General John Wheeler Cleveland. Arthur Cleveland Herbert Kenney-Herbert of the Northants Regiment was their son. Kenney-Herbert died on 5 March 1916 at Sinclair Gardens in West Kensington.

== Selected publications ==
- Culinary Jottings for Madras (1878)
- Sweet Dishes (1884)
- Vegetarian and Simple Diet (1904)
- Common-Sense Cookery for English Households (1905)
