= Seth H. Kenney =

American politician (1836–1917)

Seth H. Kenney (February 22, 1836 – May 24, 1917) was an American farmer and politician.

Kenney was born in Massachusetts and then moved to Morristown, Rice County, Minnesota in 1857 with his wife and family. He was a farmer. Kenney served in the Minnesota House of Representatives in 1879 and 1880.
