= John Kenny (cricketer) =

New Zealand cricketer

Personal information
- Born: 7 October 1883; Dunedin, Otago, New Zealand
- Died: 15 April 1937 (aged 53); Dunedin, New Zealand

Domestic team information
- Years: Team
- 1911/12: Otago
- Only FC: 23 December 1911 Otago v Canterbury
- Source: ESPNcricinfo, 15 May 2016

John Kenny (7 October 1883 – 15 April 1937) was a New Zealand businessman and cricketer. He played a single first-class match for Otago during the 1911–12 season.

Kenny was born at Dunedin in 1883. He played club cricket primarily for the Opoho club in the city, although he had also played for Grange and Dunedin Cricket Clubs. His only senior representative fixture was a December 1911 Plunket Shield match against Canterbury at Lancaster Park in Christchurch. Opening the batting, Kenny scored 11 runs in his first innings and recorded a duck in his second. Later in the season he played in Otago's annual match against Southland, a match not considered first-class during this season, and also played in the fixture the following year. He is known to have played at least twice more for the provincial team and was described after his death as "a familiar figure in cricketing circles" in Dunedin.

Professionally Kenny worked as a brass moulder, eventually setting up his own company in Dunedin. He died in April 1937 after being hit by a runaway tram car outside his home in Dunedin. He was aged 53.
