= Richard Kenney (missionary) =

Christian missionary in India

Richard Kenney was the first Church Missionary Society missionary to Bombay, then-headquarters of Bombay Presidency, to evangelize the natives.
