= John Kenney (baseball) =

American baseball player (1844–1893)

- Outfielder/Second baseman
- Born: c. 1844; Brooklyn, New York, U.S.
- Died: August 7, 1893; Brooklyn, New York, U.S
- Batted: Unknown Threw: Unknown

MLB debut
- May 2, 1872, for the Brooklyn Atlantics

Last MLB appearance
- May 20, 1872, for the Brooklyn Atlantics

MLB statistics
- Games played: 5
- At bats: 19
- Batting average: .000
- Stats at Baseball Reference

Teams
- National Association of Base Ball Players Brooklyn Atlantics (1867–1869) Union of Morrisania (1870) National Association of Professional BBP Brooklyn Atlantics (1872)

John J. Kenney (c. 1844 – August 7, 1893) was an American professional baseball player. He played outfield and second base for the Brooklyn Atlantics in 1872, when that club belatedly joined the National Association of Professional Base Ball Players in its second season.

Kenney played five games during May of that season; in 19 at bats he did not get a base hit but is credited with one run batted in.

Previously he had been a regular outfielder for the Atlantics in 1867 and a substitute infielder during the next two seasons. In the first professional season, 1869, he played primarily third base in nine of 58 team games on record. Next season he was a regular outfielder and infielder for Union of Morrisania (now in the Bronx), a lesser one of fifteen professional teams in 1870.
