= JKX Oil & Gas =

British exploration and production company

JKX Oil & Gas Limited
- Type: Private limited company
- Traded as: Delisted in 2022
- Industry: Oil & Gas
- Founded: 1995
- Headquarters: 107 Cheapside, London, England, EC2V 6DN
- Key people: Andrii Pasishnyk (CEO), Mark Katsnelson, Ihor Kravchenko
- Products: Oil and gas exploration and production
- Revenue: $90.6 million (2023)
- Operating income: $27.1 million (2023)
- Net income: $15.4 million (2023)
- Number of employees: 290 (as of May 29, 2024)
- Website: www.jkx.co.uk

JKX Oil & Gas Limited (also JKX) is a private British company engaged in the exploration and production of hydrocarbons in Ukraine. The company's headquarter is located in London, United Kingdom. The key operating subsidiaries of the company are located in Ukraine.

JKX's primary asset in Ukraine is Poltava Petroleum company which holds six production licenses.

== History ==
=== Early history ===
The company's origins lie in the Poltava Petroleum Company, the first oil and gas company with private ownership in Ukraine, which was established by J.P. Kenny Exploration and Production in 1994. In May 1995, Poltava Petroleum Company began commercial production and, in June 1995, after merging with J.P. Kenny Exploration and Production, JKX successfully went to an initial public offering on the London Stock Exchange.

Shareholdings in the Poltava Petroleum Company held by the two Ukrainian enterprises, that were involved in founding the business, were acquired by the State Property Fund of Ukraine in the late 1990s. Following a protracted legal case and the intervention of the UK Prime Minister, Tony Blair, who made representations to Ukrainian President Leonid Kuchma, JKX Oil & Gas acquired the shareholdings in Poltava Petroleum Company that it did not already own in May 2002.

Poltava Petroleum Company was the first private company in Ukraine to achieve several milestones. In 1996, it received a loan from the European Bank for Reconstruction and Development (EBRD). In 1998, it performed 3D seismic surveys over an area of 150 km^{2}. In 2002, a dew point control unit was commissioned for the first time in the Ukrainian oil and gas industry. By 2003, PPC became the first company in Ukraine to export gas to Europe. In 2010, it drilled a 1 km-long horizontal shaft, a first in Ukraine. The company built an LPG plant in 2011. In 2013, it performed a 10-stage hydraulic fracturing in a horizontal well, another first for Ukraine. PPC began selling natural gas on the electronic trading platform, UEEX, in 2016 and introduced compressors for reducing pressure at the wellhead. In 2017, the company implemented exploitation of depleted and low-yield reservoirs using the plunger lift system (U.S. technology) and started using line heaters on the wells. Also, it initiated the use of Suleimanov winches for well deparaffinization and was the first in Ukraine to close a deal on gas supply through an OTC platform in 2018.

=== Recent history ===
In January 2022, JKX de-listed from the London Stock Exchange and in February 2022, it was re-registered as a private limited company.

Prior to the Russian invasion of Ukraine, the company's business also included operating subsidiaries in Russia. In 2021, the management decided to withdraw from the Russian market and sell all existing assets, and entered negotiations with a potential buyer. However, the buyer withdrew from the deal unilaterally after Russia invaded Ukraine in February 2022. Following the sanctions imposed by Ukraine, EU, UK and USA against Russia (and countersanctions imposed by Russia against foreign investors) in response to a full-scale Russian invasion of Ukraine, JKX lost its control over the Russian Business.

Furthermore, during 2024 JKX received several Russian court rulings stating the nationalization of its former subsidiaries in Russia. As of 2024, JKX does not have any assets in Russia and does not consider any further business operations there.

In 2023, JKX's equity rights in one of the leading private oil and gas companies in Ukraine, Ukrnaftoburinnya (UNB), were expropriated by state authorities. Judicial authorities explained that the expropriation was carried out "to prevent the occurrence of emergencies related to the supply of oil and gas". The state, represented by ARMA, transferred UNB to external management under a new team of top executives. Under this new management, the company lost its production license and has been idle since December 2023. Court proceedings regarding the legality of the asset expropriation are ongoing.

In November 2023, the company received confirmation from the Registrar of Corporate Affairs in the British Virgin Islands (BVI) that its major shareholder, Eclairs Group Limited (EGL), was struck off the register on 1 November 2022 and dissolved by operation of BVI Law on 4 July 2023. As a consequence, Mr Ihor Kholomoisky, who previously had indirect control of Eclairs Group Limited, was removed from the company's PSC register on the basis that he no longer had any direct or indirect interest in JKX. Pursuant to Sn 220 of the BVI Business Companies Act 2004 (as amended), the shares in JKX previously held by EGL have now vested in the Crown.

== Board members ==
Board members are Ihor Kravchenko (executive director) and Mark Katsnelson (Non-Executive Director). Mr. Kravchenko has a background in the energy sector, while Mr. Katsnelson has particular expertise in commercial negotiations, deal structuring, the creation and management of long-term commercial relationships.

Andrii Pasishnyk is the chief executive officer (CEO).

== Operations ==
The main asset of the company in Ukraine is Poltava Petroleum company (JV PPC) (8). The company's scope of activities are prospecting and exploration for oil and gas, and hydrocarbon production and processing.

Additionally, there is an existing gas processing plant capable of handling 500,000 m3/day of gas production, along with JKX's own connecting pipeline to the regional gas grid.

In Hungary, JKX previously owned Folyopart Energia KFT (Riverside Energy KFT), which has four hydrocarbon production licenses. On 1 December 2025, the Group completed the sale of its 100% interest in JKX Hungary B.V. and its wholly owned subsidiary Folyopart Energia KFT to Hephaistos Energy Privet Limited.

== See also ==
- Eclairs Group Ltd v JKX Oil & Gas plc
