= Arthur Kenney (priest) =

Arthur Henry Kenney (c.1776 – 27 January 1855) was an Irish religious writer and Dean of Achonry from 1812 to 1821.

== Biography ==
Kenney was born around 1776 to Edward Kenney (died 23 April 1818), the Prebendary of Cork, and Frances Kenney (née Herbert).

Enrolled at Trinity College Dublin in 1790, Kenney was elected a foundation scholar in 1793. Graduating with his Bachelor's in 1795, Kenney was awarded his Master's in 1800. Becoming a junior fellow the same year, Kenney graduated with his Bachelor of Divinity in 1806. Giving up his junior fellowship in 1809, Kenny became the incumbent at Kilmacrennan in. In 1812, Kenney graduated with his Doctor of Divinity.

The same year Kenney became the Dean of Achonry. Kenney later resigned as dean in May 1821 in order to take up a new appointment as the Rector of St Olave, Southwark.

== Personal life ==
Kenney was twice married, and had several children. Kenney was the father of The Rev Arthur Robert Kenney, the rector of Bourton-on-Dunsmore, and the grandfather of Arthur Robert Kenney-Herbert, a Colonel and food writer.

Living the last 10 years of his life in Boulogne, Kenney died there on 27 January 1855.

Church of Ireland titles
Preceded by James Hastings	Dean of Achonry; 1812–1821	Succeeded by William Greene
