= Songs for Swingin' Sellers =

Studio album by Peter Sellers
- Released: 4 December 1959
- Recorded: 1959
- Studio: EMI, London
- Genre: Comedy, satire
- Length: 56:05
- Label: Parlophone
- Producer: George Martin

Peter Sellers chronology
The Best of Sellers (1958)	Songs for Swingin' Sellers (1959)	Peter and Sophia (1960)

Songs for Swingin' Sellers is the second studio album by the English actor, comedian and singer Peter Sellers. Released on EMI's Parlophone label in December 1959, the album was produced by George Martin with musical direction from Ron Goodwin and features a series of comic sketches showcasing Sellers' satirical humour and mimicry. The album was titled as a play on Frank Sinatra's Songs for Swingin' Lovers! and much of its contents pointedly satirises popular culture, with musical parodies of Sinatra and Lonnie Donegan among the tracks. Sellers plays a variety of roles alongside contributions from the comic character actress Irene Handl and the singer Matt Monro (credited as "Fred Flange"). A critical and commercial success, the album reached number three in the UK Albums Chart and Martin's elaborate production has been cited as an artistic forerunner to his work with the Beatles.

== Background ==
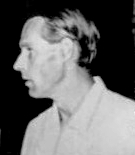
George Martin moved into comedy records as an "act of desperation"

After being promoted to head of Parlophone Records in 1955, George Martin began to shift the label, a subsidiary of EMI, away from the classical music and original cast recordings it had focused on before. Martin felt unable to compete against the American catalogues that his larger rivals His Master's Voice and Columbia released and later explained "I knew I had to make a mark in some way... ...and the way I chose was to go into comedy, because no one was doing it. People were doing it in the States – Stan Freberg, Bob Newhart — but there was nothing in England to speak of. And it seemed to work". Martin was aided by the contemporary success of radio comedy and believed "comedy records succeeded because sound dominated in the days before television got its grip on people". He was dispirited when the BBC radio comedy stars the Goons left Parlophone for Decca after their cover of "Unchained Melody" was blocked from release by the song's publishers, but he achieved a breakthrough in 1957 when he worked with Peter Sellers again; Sellers' comic recording of "Any Old Iron", a music hall song given a satirical skiffle arrangement and sung in the voice of The Goon Show character Willium "Mate" Cobblers, reached number 17 on the UK Singles Chart. Recognising that Sellers was capable of "a daydreaming form of humour which could be amusing and seductive without requiring the trigger of a live audience", Martin pitched a full album to EMI. The management were reluctant, doubting the commercial viability of a full-length studio comedy record. They agreed only to a compromise: that The Best of Sellers be made at a reduced production budget for release as a 10-inch LP rather than a standard 12-inch. The album's tongue-in-cheek title proved apt when it became a number three hit. Subsequently, Martin was asked to make a second album with Sellers by the same people who had denigrated the idea of the first, something he considered "a kind of accolade, which recognised Parlophone as the label for humorous people" according to biographer Ken Womack.

== Style and themes ==
Songs for Swingin' Sellers was titled as a play on Frank Sinatra's chart-topping Songs for Swingin' Lovers!. (Note: According to Angela Morley, Songs for Swingin' Lovers was played at Sellers' New Year's Eve party in 1957.) Its sketches employ satire, with Sellers playing "a typically wide range of characters" and parodying broadcasters, entertainers and the upper class. Biographer Andrew Norman identified hypocrisy as a recurring theme, writing that the album afforded Sellers "the opportunity to mock those whom he considered to be insincere". As with The Best of Sellers, radio comedy writers Frank Muir and Denis Norden contributed several sketches; their work on the album has been cited as indicative of a wave of young comedy writers who, despite having some background in variety, "had largely cultivated their talents via radio and television, and recognised that subtler approaches were necessary for such media".

The album was among George Martin's first stereophonic records, allowing the producer "to paint his sound pictures with added texture and depth" according to Mark Lewisohn. David Hepworth has written that Martin and arranger Ron Goodwin "placed Sellers' inventions in a soundscape which meant that you kept playing the record long after any belly laughs had exhausted themselves".

== Contents ==
=== Side one ===
According to Spencer Leigh, "You Keep Me Swingin'" mocks "the image of Frank Sinatra as the perpetual swinger". The song, arranged by Ron Goodwin in a big band approximation of Nelson Riddle’s work with Sinatra, was written by George Martin (under the pseudonym Graham Fisher) and Ken Hare. Intending to sing on the track, Sellers asked Martin to find Sinatra soundalike to record a demo vocal to help guide him. Martin considering using Dennis Lotis before recruiting Matt Monro, whose performance was ultimately used on the album after Sellers felt he couldn't improve upon it. (Note: Monro had been dropped by both Decca and Fontana after failing to find success.) Billed on the album as "Fred Flange" (a name conceived by Martin), Monro found the experience demoralising but his impersonation was close enough to prompt speculation that it was Sinatra himself. The BBC gave "You Keep Me Swingin'" heavy airplay and Monro was subsequently offered a Parlophone contract by Martin, initiating a successful partnership between the two men. Written by comedy partners Denis Norden and Frank Muir, "So Little Time" lampoons the English impresario Larry Parnes and his stable of young rock & roll stars including Marty Wilde and Billy Fury. Parnes is caricatured as Major Rafe Ralph, a horse dealer turned pop manager who lives with his protégés Lenny Bronze, Clint Thigh, Matt Lust and Twit Conway in a luxury Mayfair flat. Ralph and Conway are interviewed by Nancy Lisbon, a parody of prominent broadcaster Nancy Spain. According to Gillian A.M. Mitchell, the sketch reflects how "rock and skiffle frequently seemed, for certain avant-garde performers, to connote dim, talentless singers and manipulative managers".

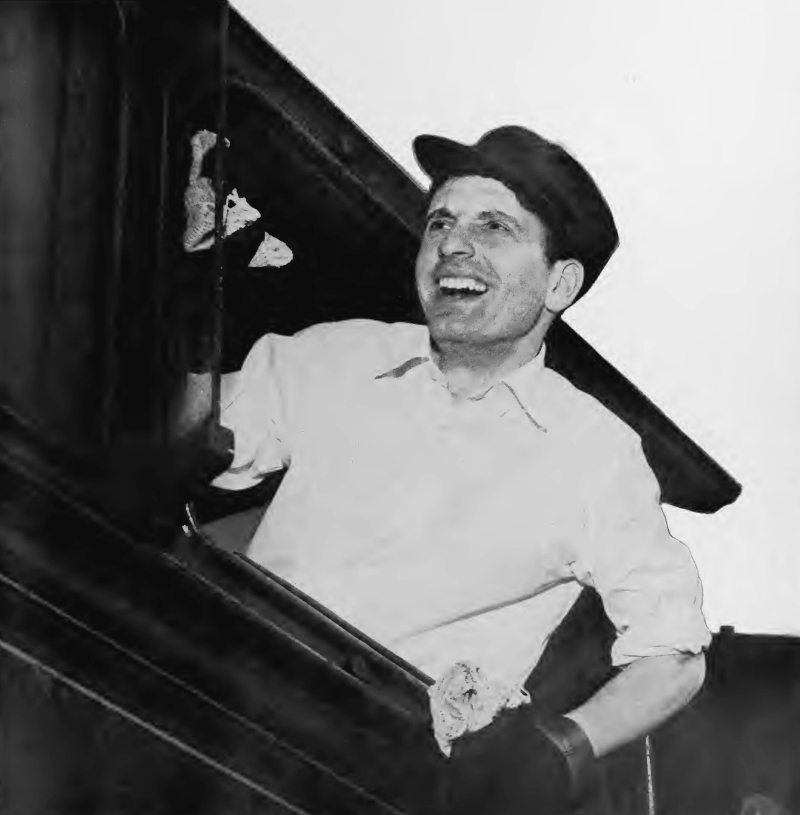
In "Puttin' On the Smile", Lenny Goonigan frequently mentions "workin' on the railroad", an allusion to Lonnie Donegan's "Rock Island Line"

"The Contemporary Scene – 1: Radio Today" consists of two sketches. The first, "Lord Badminton's Memoirs", has Sellers as an aristocrat recounting his life and betraying his disregard for the welfare of his employees. In his liner notes for the album, Peter Munro-Smith advised that the sketch may bring on "an acute attack of nostalgia" to those over seventy. The second, "The Critics", has Sellers and the comic actress Irene Handl poking art critics in broadcasting, with a panel of speakers discussing an art exhibition at the Tate using excessive, indecipherable jargon. Handl's character, Faith Bradshaw, is a parody of Dilys Powell. Sellers' rendition of "My Old Dutch", a music hall song published in 1892 and written by Albert Chevalier and Charles Ingle, is delivered with mock-sentimentality and deliberately over-the-top emotion. The song had been taught to Sellers as a child by his mother, Peg, and biographer Ed Sikov has postulated that Sellers' apparent distaste of it explains the rendering's "distinctly nasty edge". "The Contemporary Scene – 2: T.V. Today" consists of two sketches. The first, "Face to Face", has Sellers play a loquacious interviewer who never allows his interviewee to answer the questions. The second, "In a Free State", presents an interview with Mr Bedham, an Irish playwright who is "slurred, angry, panting and ready to commit murder to get at a drink". Bedham is a parody of the Irish playwright Brendan Behan, who generated significant publicity for his play The Quare Fellow in June 1956 when he made a drunken appearance on BBC Television programme Panorama. According to the journalist William J. Weatherby, Behan's wife admired Sellers' impersonation of her husband and considered Bedham's references to "the thirst" the most accurate part of the sketch.

=== Side two ===
"Puttin' On the Smile", a parody of Lonnie Donegan's recording of "Puttin' On the Style", caricatures the skiffle craze. It features Sellers in the guise of a self-serving folk singer named Lenny Goonigan. As well as a musical spoof, the track presents an interview with Goonigan and satirises Donegan's practice of covering American folk songs; when asked if he's been to the Deep South, Goonigan tells the interviewer "I've been all over, man - Brighton, Portsmouth, Truro, Penzance". Goonigan also explains that his last record was "an obscure folk song hidden at the top of the American hit parade". Donegan was unamused by the sketch.

"Common Entrance" has Sellers portraying both roles in an interview between a British boarding school headmaster and the parent of a sensitive prospective student. "I Haven't Told Her, She Hasn't Told Me (But We Know It Just the Same)" is sung "in pleasant voice" by Sellers accompanying himself on ukulele. Sellers later performed the song in the 1973 film The Optimists of Nine Elms and on the BBC1 series Parkinson in 1974. "Shadows on the Grass" features Sellers as a Frenchman who meets a whimsical older woman (Irene Handl) in the park. Martin and engineer Stuart Eltham edited the recording, originally nearly twelve minutes long, for the album. Sellers performs "Wouldn't It Be Loverly", a popular showtune from Lerner and Loewe's My Fair Lady, as Mr Banerjee, a stereotypical Indian man. The musical accompaniment to the track employs sitar and tabla, the first time George Martin had used Hindustani classical music instrumentation in one of his productions. "We'll Let You Know" features a budding actor, Warrington Minge, auditioning for a role with the "winter of our discontent" soliloquy from Richard III, to the disinterest and boredom of the producer. In his liner notes for the EP release Songs for Swingin' Sellers (No. 2), Derek Johnson describes the piece as an example of Sellers' "genuine sense of pathos". The album's last track, "Peter Sellers sings George Gershwin", lasts 17 seconds and, after an introduction, simply consists of Sellers' vocalising "George Ge-ersh-win".

== Release ==
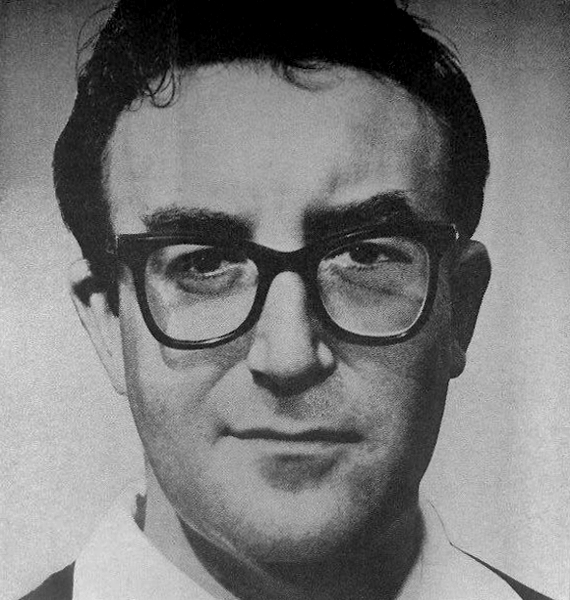
Peter Sellers' likeness appears on a wanted poster on the album cover

Songs for Swingin' Sellers was released on 4 December 1959 in a sleeve depicting "the booted and spurred feet of a man, presumably the artist, hanging from a tree above one of those record players that the adventurous might take on a picnic". The artwork appears in Barry Miles, Grant Scott and Johnny Morgan's book The Greatest Album Covers of All Time, in which it is speculated that the shot of a hanged man may have been inspired by "Mort Sahl's brand of 'sick humour'". In addition, the packaging carries several humorous notes, including instructions to "only use needles of Burmese plywood" to play the record and to "send Grandma out of the room".

The album reached number three on the Melody Maker albums chart (now the UK Albums Chart), remaining in the chart for 34 non-consecutive weeks, and its strong sales gave George Martin a sense of vindication about his production work. The album's release followed the issue of a single, "My Old Dutch" b/w "Puttin' On the Smile", that failed to chart. Following the stereo and mono LP release, the album was released on 7-inch over three volumes of mono EPs in 1961.

As part of the promotion for the album, Parlophone played upon the identity of Fred Flange (Matt Monro), whose Frank Sinatra impersonation on "You Keep Me Swingin'" received significant attention in the music press. The album's liner notes read "for mainly political reasons, the real identity of this performer must be kept secret", fueling rumours it was Sinatra himself. Parlophone were indundated with letters and phone calls about the mystery singer and published cryptic publicity photos of Monro shot from behind and wearing a hat. When Flange's identity was eventually revealed, Reuters called Monro's vocal "the cleverest and most irreverent impersonation of a singing idol ever recorded". (Note: Monro was less enthused, telling Melody Maker "when I heard the playback, it sounded exactly like me and nobody else. But apparently that's just the way I heard it.") Monro then achieved a string of hit singles with Martin as producer, beginning with "Portrait of My Love" in 1960.

In 1978, the album was reissued in Australia on the World Record Club label. It made its CD debut in 1993 as part of the Celebration of Sellers box set. In 2010, Hallmark Music & Entertainment issued a standalone CD release with the cover art edited to remove the dangling legs of the hanged man.

== Critical reception ==
Professional ratings
Review scores
Source	Rating
AllMusic	4.5/5 stars

Upon release, Songs for Swingin' Sellers received critical acclaim. New Musical Express praised Sellers' "devastating wit" and described the album as "just the thing for the interval at your Christmas party". Reg Exton of London's Norwood News praised the album as "real comedy, sometimes satirical, but never dull" and considered "So Little Time" the highlight, while David Langdon of the Sunday Pictorial described it as "one of the funniest records ever".

Reviewing Songs for Swingin' Sellers in 1961, Mervyn Douglas of Record Mail declared "what a performer this man is – sheer genius, ranging from biting comedy to moments of intense pathos. Nobody can quite portray characters and life like Peter Sellers". In a retrospective review for AllMusic, Richie Unterberger considered the album to contain "some of (Sellers') best sketches" and singled out "Puttin' On the Smile" as the highlight. In 2025, Uncut ranked Songs for Swingin' Sellers at number 440 in their list of "The 500 Greatest Albums of the 1950s", with contributor Mark Beamount noting how Martin "warms up for The Beatles" on a record which "[mingles] character sketches and interludes with convincing pastiches of Lonnie Donegan and Sinatra."

== Aftermath and legacy ==
In a feature for Disc published soon after release, Russ Conway named the album as among his choices for a Christmas party. In October 1961, Hattie Jacques chose "Lord Badminton's Memoirs" as one of her Desert Island Discs on the BBC radio programme. Writing in 2002, Simon Louvich of the Guardian considered Songs for Swingin' Sellers to contain "some of the master’s most primal acts", while Stephen Thomas Erlewine of Pitchfork has described the album as "perhaps the best showcase for George Martin's nascent skills".

In his 2013 book A Fabulous Creation: How the LP Saved Our Lives, David Hepworth describes the album as "one of the artistic forerunners" to Martin's later production Sgt. Pepper's Lonely Hearts Club Band (1967). (Note: Martin made a similar comparison in the 2012 documentary Produced by George Martin, stating "building up Sgt. Pepper became a bit like working on a Peter Sellers record".) The poet Roger McGough has praised the album as a "comedy classic", and his Scaffold bandmate Mike McCartney said he was attracted to working with Martin due to his work with Sellers, saying of Songs for Swingin' Sellers "Paul and I had fallen about laughing to those nice little sketches".

"So Little Time" has been cited by Michael McKean and Christopher Guest as an antecedent to Spinal Tap. The song "Rush" by Big Audio Dynamite II contains a sample from "You Keep Me Swingin'."

== Track listing ==
Side one
No.	Title	Writer(s)	Length
1.	"You Keep Me Swingin'"	Ken Hare, Graham Fisher	2:51
2.	"So Little Time"	Frank Muir, Denis Norden	6:31
3.	"The Contemporary Scene – 1: Radio Today": "Lord Badminton's Memoirs"; "The Critics"	Max Shreiner, Ron Goodwin	10:42
4.	"My Old Dutch"	Albert Chevalier, Charles Ingle	2:48
5.	"The Contemporary Scene – 2: T.V. Today": "Face to Face"; "In a Free State"	Shreiner, Goodwin	4:12

Side two
No.	Title	Writer(s)	Length
1.	"Puttin' On the Smile"	Reuben, Ransom	5:24
2.	"Common Entrance"	Muir, Norden	5:00
3.	"I Haven't Told Her, She Hasn't Told Me (But We Know It Just the Same)"	Al Dubin, Sammy Fain, Irving Kahal	1:11
4.	"Shadows on the Grass"	Irene Handl	6:24
5.	"Wouldn't It Be Loverly"	Al Lerner, Frederick Loewe	5:56
6.	"We'll Let You Know"	Sellers	3:24
7.	"Peter Sellers Sings George Gershwin"		0:17
