= Balham - Gateway to the South =

1949 radio sketch

"Balham, Gateway to the South" is a comedy sketch that parodies cinema travelogues by presenting the South London suburb of Balham as an exotic locale. It was written by Frank Muir and Denis Norden for the short-lived BBC radio series Third Division and featured in the second edition broadcast on the BBC Third Programme on 2 February 1949. The sketch's depiction of Balham as a faraway, desirable location contrasted with the real area during postwar austerity. One memorable part of the sketch is the pronunciation of Balham as American English: /ˈbælˈhæm/ BAL-HAM, in an American accent, instead of the usual British English: /ˈbæləm/ BAL-uhm.

The original sketch was performed by Peter Sellers as narrator, with others, such as Benny Hill and Michael Bentine, contributing other voices. The script features exaggerated claims regarding the attractions of the area. Sellers performs the sketch solo, in a parody of the American newsreel-travelogue host James A. Fitzpatrick, on the 1958 Parlophone record The Best of Sellers, produced by George Martin. The sketch is scored by Ron Goodwin, which led Alfred Hitchcock to engage him to do the score for Frenzy.

"Balham - Gateway to the South" has entered common usage as a catch phrase in the United Kingdom. It has been invoked in the House of Lords; by Baroness Garden of Frognal in regards to tourism spending in 2011 and by Baron Greaves in a parliamentary debate regarding HS2 in 2020.

The sketch was expanded in 1979 to form the script of a short (21-minute) colour film of the same name directed by Micky Dolenz and starring Danny Schiller and Judy Gridley as American tourists and Robbie Coltrane in several roles, including those originally voiced by Sellers. It is narrated, in an English accent, by David de Keyser and was released for broadcast in 1981. In 1990, the Triangle Action Group proposed the erection of a statue of Sellers in the centre of Balham due to the sketch's impact on its tourist trade. Upon hearing of this, the writers Frank Muir and Denis Norden penned a letter published in the Evening Standard, stating "for a trifling sum, we would be prepared to go along to the new shopping centre and stand there personally".

== Sources ==
- Muir, Frank (1997). A Kentish Lad. London: Bantam Press. ISBN 0-552-14137-2.
- Sikov, Ed (2002). Mr Strangelove; A Biography of Peter Sellers. London: Sidgwick & Jackson. ISBN 978-0-283-07297-0.
