= The Best of Sellers =

Studio album by Peter Sellers
- Released: 6 December 1958
- Recorded: October 1958
- Studios: EMI, London
- Genres: Comedy, satire
- Length: 36:13
- Label: Parlophone
- Producer: George Martin

Peter Sellers chronology
The Best of Sellers (1958)	Songs for Swingin' Sellers (1959)

The Best of Sellers is the first studio album by the English actor, comedian and singer Peter Sellers. Released as a 10-inch LP on EMI's Parlophone label in December 1958, the album has been cited as "the first British comedy LP created in a recording studio". Sellers plays all of the roles, satirising the British class system and rock and roll, and the album represented an artistic breakthrough for producer George Martin. Despite initial concerns about its commercial viability from EMI, The Best of Sellers was a major success, receiving critical acclaim and reaching number three in the UK Albums Chart.

== Background ==
Born in 1925 to a family of variety entertainers, Peter Sellers received attention as a member of the Entertainments National Service Association (ENSA) during the Second World War. In 1948, he became a regular BBC radio comedy performer, appearing with Ted Ray in Ray's a Laugh and, from 1951, alongside Spike Milligan, Harry Secombe and Michael Bentine in The Goon Show. Sellers found acclaim for his impersonations and satirical humour and began appearing in film, sometimes in voice acting roles.

Sellers first appeared on record in 1953 when he lent his voice to Parlophone's Jakka and the Flying Saucers, a science fiction play for children written by lyricist Ken Hare and composer Ron Goodwin. Though its producer George Martin ultimately considered the project a "complete disaster", he was impressed by Sellers' impersonations including Winston Churchill as the voice of God. After Martin was appointed head of Parlophone, he recorded with Sellers again, this time paired with Milligan as the Goons. However, their planned first single, a parodic version of "Unchained Melody", was blocked from release by the song's publishers, leading the Goons to leave Parlophone for Decca.

Sellers was signed to Parlophone as a solo act in 1957, reuniting him with Martin after the success of the producer's first comedy LP, a live recording of Flanders and Swann's musical revue At the Drop of a Hat. For Sellers' first single, the two created a version of the music hall number "Any Old Iron" employing a skiffle arrangement and the voice of The Goon Show character Willium "Mate" Cobblers. It reached number 17 on the UK Singles Chart. Recognising Sellers' capacity for "a daydreaming form of humour which could be amusing and seductive without requiring the trigger of a live audience", Martin pitched a full album to EMI. The managing director and EMI record division were reluctant, believing no-one would be interested in "a whole half-hour" of studio comedy. A compromise was reached between Martin and the management; the album would be made at a reduced production budget and issued as a 10-inch LP rather than a standard 12-inch.

The album was recorded in three sessions in October 1958, each lasting three hours. Musical direction was provided by Ron Goodwin who, with George Martin, "placed Sellers' inventions in a soundscape which meant that you kept playing the record long after any belly laughs had exhausted themselves" according to David Hepworth. The album was a breakthrough for Martin, who had been inspired by Stan Freberg's work for Capitol; according to Mark Lewisohn, The Best of Sellers was the first British comedy LP created in a recording studio. Ahead of the album's release, Sellers told the Daily Herald "I've never had the time to do a record like this before. Now I've had a chance to put down all the odd little things that have amused me over the years". He considered the album largely uncommercial.

== Contents ==
=== Side one ===
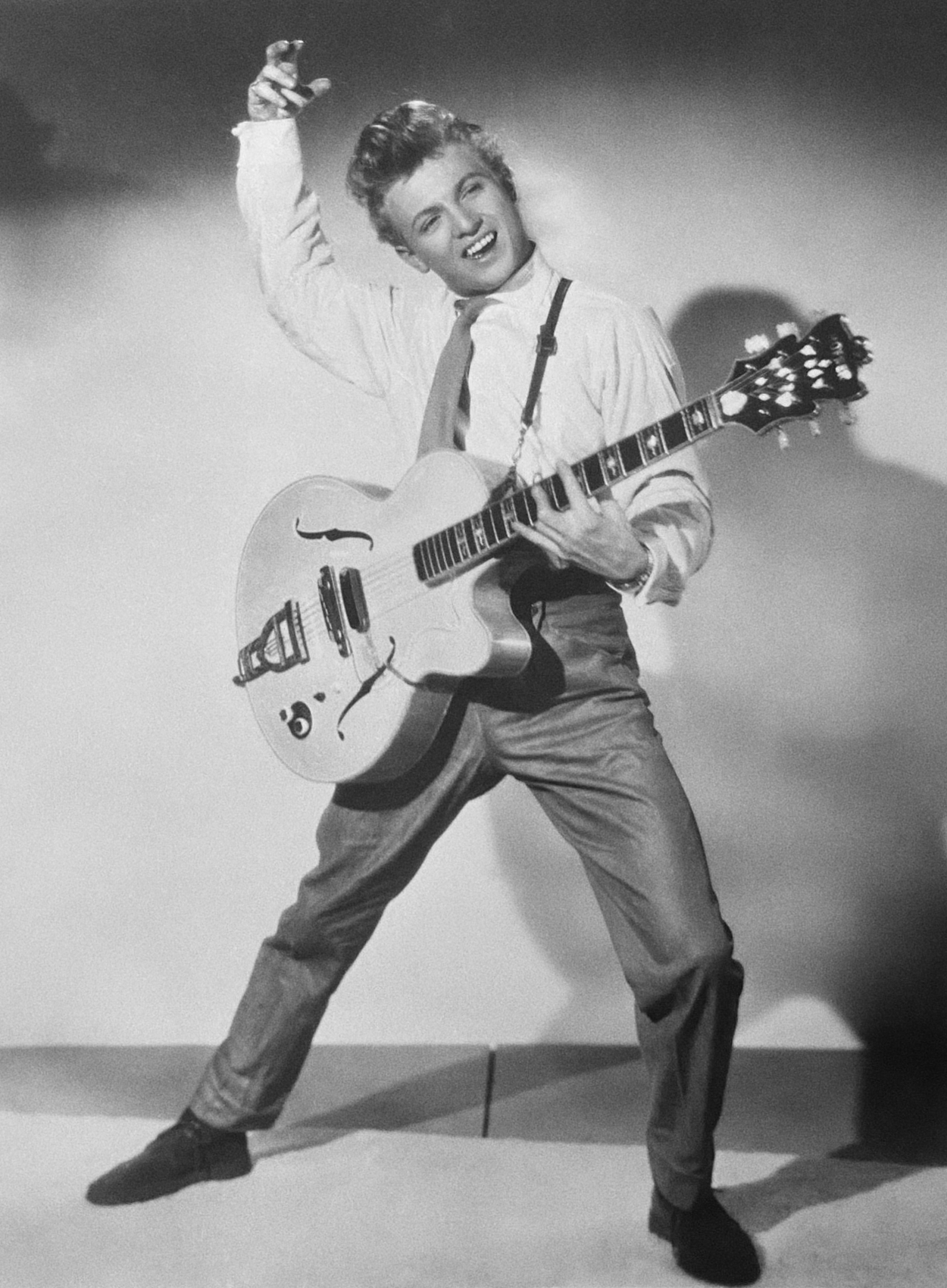
Tommy Steele is parodied in "The Trumpet Volunteer"

"The Trumpet Volunteer" consists of an interview between a reporter and a young Cockney pop star named Mr. Iron, a parody of Bermondsey-born teen idol Tommy Steele. Iron is depicted as ill-informed and naive and discusses his new rock and roll version of Jeremiah Clarke's Trumpet voluntary, dismissing its disputed authorship (Purcell) as irrelevant – "All I know is, it's out of copyright". Pop music spoofs became a hallmark of Sellers' records; his second album Songs for Swingin' Sellers features mock interviews that parody the Larry Parnes stable and Lonnie Donegan, respectively. In "Auntie Rotter", written by the comedian Bob Monkhouse with Ron Goodwin, Sellers plays a sadistic children's presenter who issues homicidal instructions for children in what Roger Lewis calls "a send-up of the patronising Enid Blyton way of talking to tiny tots". With accompanying piano backing, Sellers' Auntie Rotter guides the listener in murdering their mother ("Out with your Robin Hood sword and plunge it into mummy's back with a one, two, three"), father and grandparents before the children are advised to bring "daddy's silly old cash and stocks and shares" to "Auntie Rotter's Home for Orphans, Balls Pond Road, London". The piece has been described as a parody of the BBC radio programme Listen with Mother.

"All the Things You Are" is a version of the jazz standard composed by Jerome Kern with lyrics written by Oscar Hammerstein II for the musical Very Warm for May (1939). Sellers performs the song as the Goon Show character Willium "Mate" Cobblers singing in his bathtub. "We Need the Money" parodies artistocracy, with Sellers portraying a British earl who demonstrates to an American interviewer his various money-making gimmicks, including a rock and roll record ("... they call me Earl Creole").

=== Side two ===
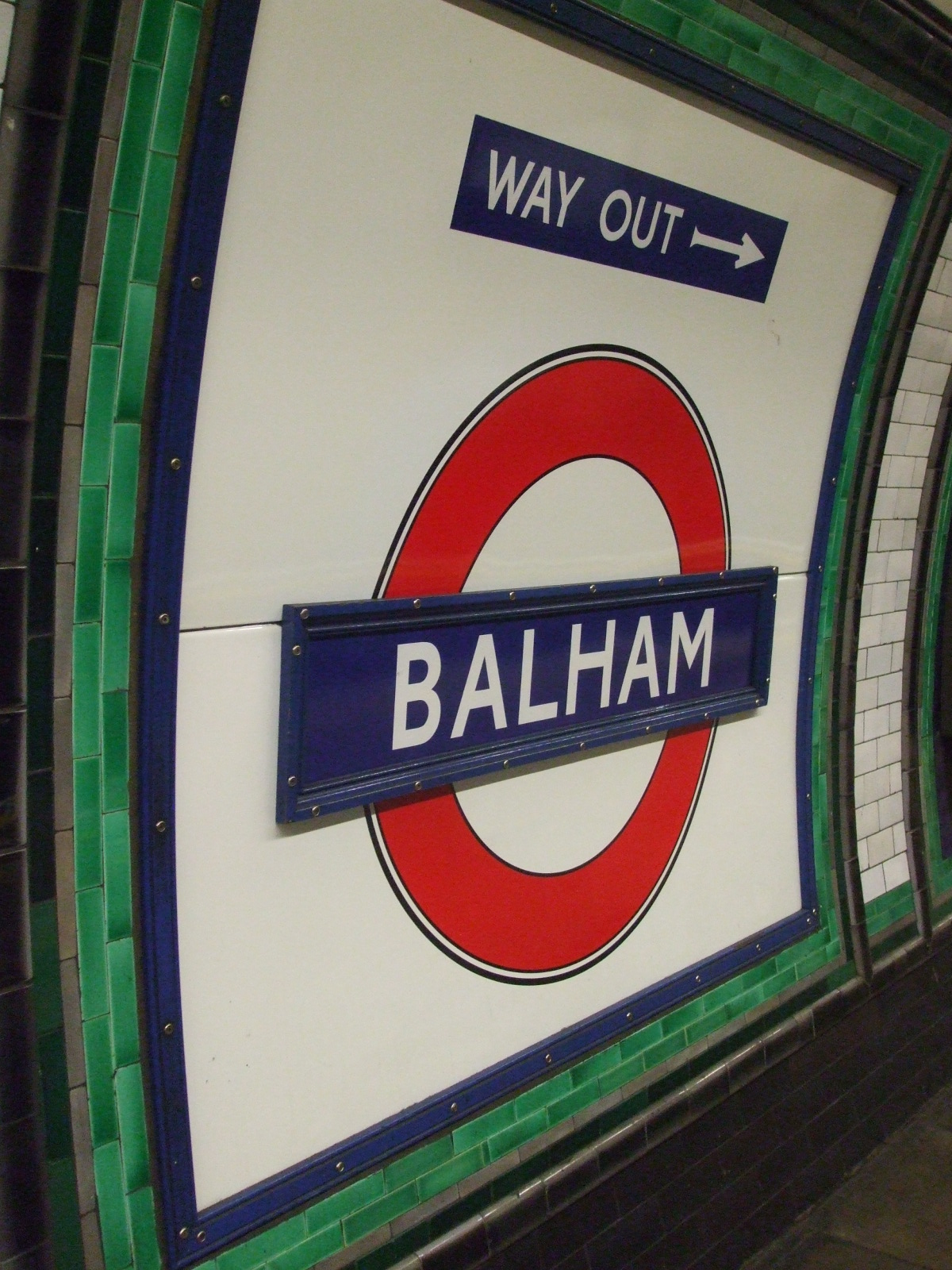
"Balham - Gateway to the South" has entered common lexicon.

"I'm So Ashamed" has Sellers in the guise of an eight-year-old singing an inane pop ballad expressing his shame because - despite all the gimmicks he's tried - he hasn't had a top twenty hit in three weeks. Described by Mark Lewisohn as the best example of Sellers' satires of the music business, "I'm So Ashamed" "cruelly but hilariously takes apart the present-day "child prodigy" craze" according to Ken Graham of Disc. Graham wrote that rock enthuasists would be "up in arms" after hearing the piece. In an interview ahead of its release, Sellers considered "I'm So Ashamed" the album's only "really commercial track". "Party Political Speech" caricatures what biographer Andrew Norman calls "the typical politician, who is fond of the sound of his own voice, but whose utterances are, in fact, utterly vacuous". Sellers' politician speaks fluently and continuously without ever making a point. The sketch cuts out after the character finally says "in conclusion, let me say just this". AllMusic's Richie Unterberger deemed "Party Political Speech" the best of the album's non-musical sketches, characterising it as "a typically stuffy and meaningless British harangue". In a 1962 lecture at Cambridge University, Leonard Wilson Forster likened the sketch to the nonsense verse of German poet Christian Morgenstern.

"Balham - Gateway to the South", written by the comedy team Frank Muir and Denis Norden, lampoons cinema travelogues by presenting the suburban South London area Balham as an exotic locale. (Note: The title likely alludes to the 1928 Southern Railway poster "Gateway to the Continent" by T D Kerr.) Sellers' enthuastic Midwestern American-accented narrator persistently renders the area's name as "Bal-Ham". Sellers first performed "Balham - Gateway to the South" in a 1949 edition of the BBC Third Programme radio comedy series Third Division and the sketch was "quickly a national favourite" after its inclusion on The Best of Sellers, according to Mark Lewisohn. "Suddenly It's Folk Song" parodies folk music of the British Isles, with three purported field recordings of English, Scottish and Irish folk music. The first of these is a bawdy singalong in an English West country pub, the second an example of "the Scottish mouth music" performed on a busy street in Glasgow. The third recording is of a performance in a pub by an Irish showband that descends into a brawl. To achieve an appropriate sound effect for this section, Sellers kicked a chair across the studio. The chair hit Martin in the shins and the resulting cry of pain can be heard on the track.

== Release ==
The Best of Sellers was released as a 10-inch LP in December 1958. (Note: Martin went uncredited as producer on the album.) The album title, a tongue-in-cheek allusion to EMI's scepticism, was devised by George Martin; it proved apt when the album became a number five hit on the UK Albums Chart in April 1959. The album later re-entered the chart, reaching a new peak at number three in September 1959. Sellers' follow-up, Songs for Swingin' Sellers, was issued in December 1959; Martin considered the second album's commissioning "a kind of accolade, which recognised Parlophone as the label for humorous people".

The album followed the single release of "I'm So Ashamed" backed with "A Drop of the Hard Stuff", the Irish section from "Suddenly It's Folk Song". Issued in November 1958, the single failed to chart.

A 12-inch version of The Best of Sellers, with the 10" track listing, was issued on EMI's budget Starline label in 1973, with the cover stating "re-released by popular demand". A 12" version issued in Australia on EMI's Axis label had two bonus tracks. The 10" track listing was issued on CD in 1993 as part of the Celebration of Sellers box set.

== Critical reception ==
Professional ratings
Review scores
Source	Rating
AllMusic	4.5/5 stars
Disc	5/5 stars

The Best of Sellers received critical acclaim upon release. Writing in Disc, Ken Graham began his review "if you come across any typing errors in this review you'll have to forgive me as I have been rolling about the floor helpless with laughter". Graham described Sellers as "the end of entertainment" and praised his "first-rate parodies", commenting "the only pity is that video-discs have not yet reached the market, and, therefore, we have to do without Mr. Sellers in person". Mike Nevard of the Daily Herald praised Sellers' "vicious satire" and predicted that the record would be 1958's Christmas number one album. Writing in the Leicester Mercury, John Mitchell praised Sellers' "startlingly wide talents" and considered his impersonations "uncannily close to life", comparing them favourably against "the old, 'voice of 'em all' school, doing impressions of Charles Laughton and Gracie Fields".

In a retrospective review for AllMusic, Richie Unterberger deemed Sellers' first album "probably his funniest" and praised "The Trumpet Volunteer" and "We Need the Money" as "two of the best rock & roll parodies ever made". Writing in The Beatles: All These Years: Volume One – Tune In, Mark Lewisohn praised the album as "a five-star record", considering it "an early and robust example" of the productions George Martin referred to as 'sound pictures'. In 2017, George Martin biographer Kenneth Womack wrote that album consists of "one sidesplitting comic confection after another".

== Aftermath and legacy ==
In the years following the album's release, "Balham - Gateway to the South" entered common usage as a phrase in the United Kingdom. It has been invoked in the House of Lords; by Baroness Garden of Frognal in regards to tourism spending in 2011 and by Baron Greaves in a parliamentary debate regarding HS2 in 2020. In 1979, Micky Dolenz of the Monkees directed a short film based on the sketch with Robbie Coltrane playing multiple roles. It was released for broadcast in 1981. In 1990, the Triangle Action Group proposed the erection of a statue of Sellers in the centre of Balham due to the sketch's impact on its tourist trade. Upon hearing of this, the writers Frank Muir and Denis Norden penned a letter published in the Evening Standard stating "for a trifling sum, we would be prepared to go along to the new shopping centre and stand there personally".

In 2011, broadcaster and writer Danny Baker chose "I'm So Ashamed" as one of his Desert Island Discs on the BBC radio programme, describing its lyric as "an eternal truth in pop music".

== Track listing ==
Side one
No.	Title	Writer(s)	Length
1.	"The Trumpet Volunteer"	Peter Sellers, Ken Hare	7:29
2.	"Auntie Rotter"	Bob Monkhouse, Ron Goodwin	3:09
3.	"All the Things You Are"	Jerome Kern, Oscar Hammerstein II	2:13
4.	"We Need the Money"	Hare, Sellers	5:49

Side two
No.	Title	Writer(s)	Length
1.	"I'm So Ashamed"	Hare	3:03
2.	"Party Political Speech"	Max Shreiner	3:04
3.	"Balham - Gateway to the South"	Frank Muir, Denis Norden	6:05
4.	"Suddenly It's Folk Song"	Sellers, Graham Fisher	5:21
