= Gateway to the South (disambiguation) =

Gateway to the South is a nickname for Louisville, Kentucky, in the United States.

Gateway to the South may also refer to:

- Balham - Gateway to the South, 1949 comedy sketch performed by Peter Sellers
- Gateway to the South, 1996 album by The Balham Alligators
