= Peter Sellers =

English actor and comedian (1925–1980)

Peter Sellers CBE
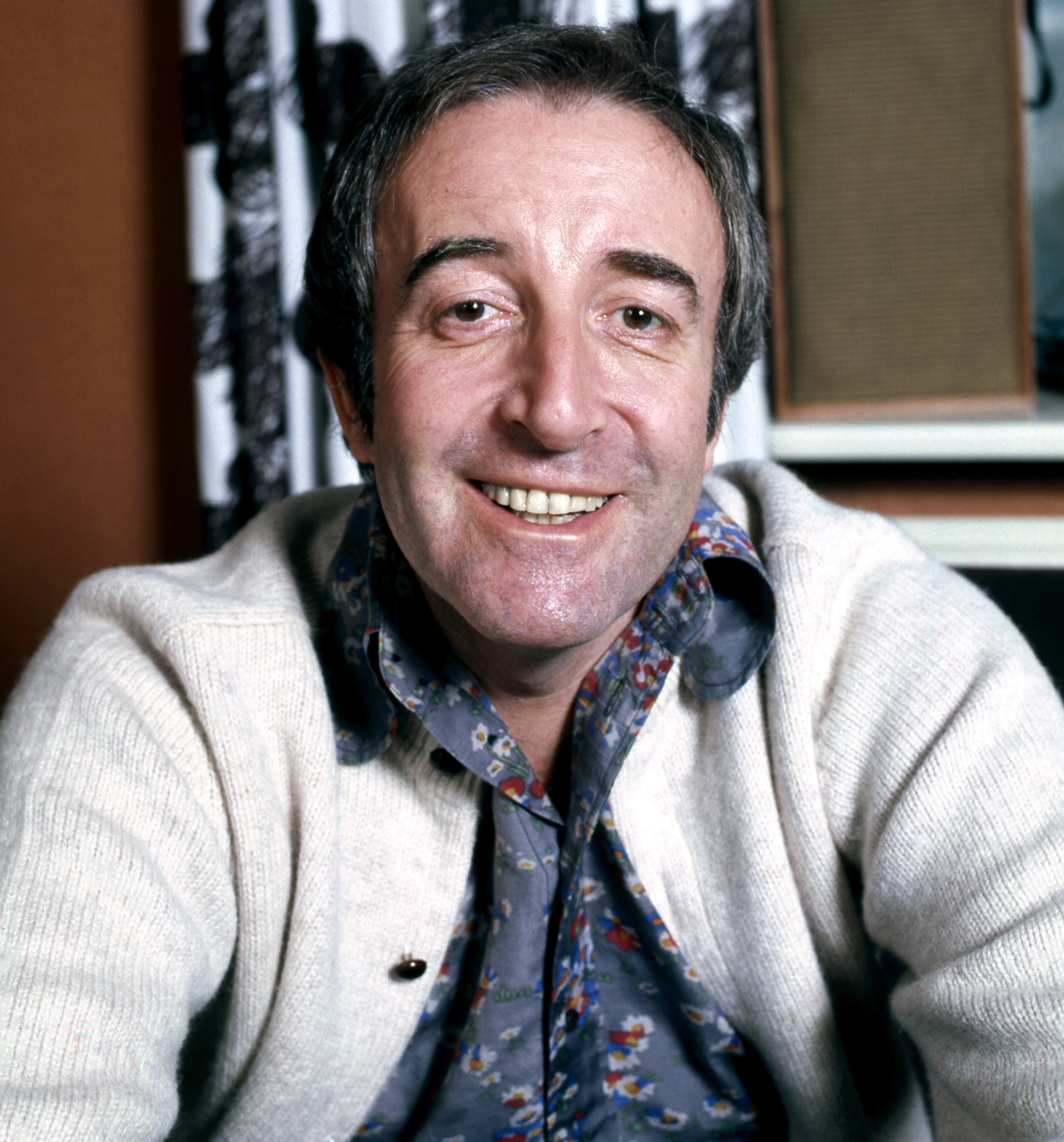
- Sellers in 1973
- Born: 8 September 1925; Southsea, England
- Died: 24 July 1980 (aged 54); London, England
- Occupations: Actor; comedian
- Years active: 1925–1980
- Works: Roles and awards
- Spouses: Anne Howe (m. 1951; div. 1963) Britt Ekland (m. 1964; div. 1968) Miranda Quarry (m. 1970; div. 1974) Lynne Frederick (m. 1977)
- Children: 3, including Michael and Victoria

Peter Sellers (born Richard Henry Sellers; 8 September 1925 – 24 July 1980) was an English actor and comedian. He first came to prominence with his performances on the BBC Radio comedy series The Goon Show. Sellers was featured on a number of hit comic songs and became internationally acclaimed for his film roles, most notably as Chief Inspector Clouseau in The Pink Panther series.

Sellers made his stage debut at the Kings Theatre, Southsea, as an infant, and began accompanying his parents in a touring variety act. He worked as a drummer and toured around England as a member of the Entertainments National Service Association (ENSA). He developed his mimicry and improvisational skills during a spell in Ralph Reader's wartime Gang Show entertainment troupe. After the war, Sellers made his radio debut in ShowTime, and eventually became a regular performer on various BBC Radio shows. In 1951, Sellers, along with Spike Milligan, Harry Secombe, and Michael Bentine, began starring in the successful radio series The Goon Show, which ended in 1960.

Sellers began his film career during the 1950s. Although the bulk of his work was comedic, often parodying characters of authority such as military officers or policemen, he also performed in other film genres. Films demonstrating his artistic range include The Ladykillers (1955), The Mouse That Roared (1959), I'm All Right Jack (1959), The Millionairess (1960), Lolita (1962), five films of the Pink Panther series (1963–1978), Dr. Strangelove (1964), What's New Pussycat? (1965), Casino Royale (1967), The Party (1968), I Love You, Alice B. Toklas (1968), The Magic Christian (1969), Being There (1979), and The Fiendish Plot of Dr. Fu Manchu (1980). Sellers's versatility enabled him to portray a wide range of comic characters using different accents and guises, and he would often assume multiple roles within the same film, frequently with contrasting temperaments and styles. Satire and black humour were major features of many of his films, as they had been in his radio and record performances. These performances had a strong influence on a number of later comedians.

Sellers was nominated three times for an Academy Award, twice for Best Actor, for his performances in Dr. Strangelove and Being There, and once for the Best Live Action Short Film for The Running Jumping & Standing Still Film (1959). He won the BAFTA Award for Best Actor in a Leading Role for his role in I'm All Right Jack and was nominated an additional three times for the satire Only Two Can Play, for Dr. Strangelove and The Pink Panther, and for Being There. In 1980 he won the Golden Globe Award for Best Actor in a Motion Picture – Musical or Comedy for his role in Being There, having previously been nominated three times in the same category. Turner Classic Movies calls Sellers "one of the most accomplished comic actors of the late 20th century".

In his personal life, Sellers struggled with depression and insecurities. An enigmatic figure, he often claimed to have no identity outside the roles that he played. His behaviour was often erratic and compulsive, and he frequently clashed with his directors and co-stars, especially in the mid-1970s, when his physical and mental health, together with his alcohol and drug problems, was at its worst. Sellers was married four times and had three children from his first two marriages. He died from a heart attack, aged 54, in 1980. English filmmakers the Boulting brothers described Sellers as "the greatest comic genius this country has produced since Charles Chaplin".

== Life and career ==
=== 1925–1939: Early life and career beginnings ===
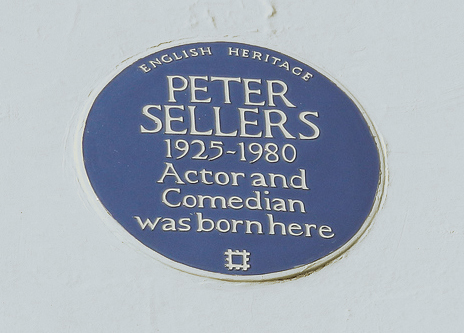
Blue plaque memorial at Sellers's birthplace in Castle Road, Portsmouth

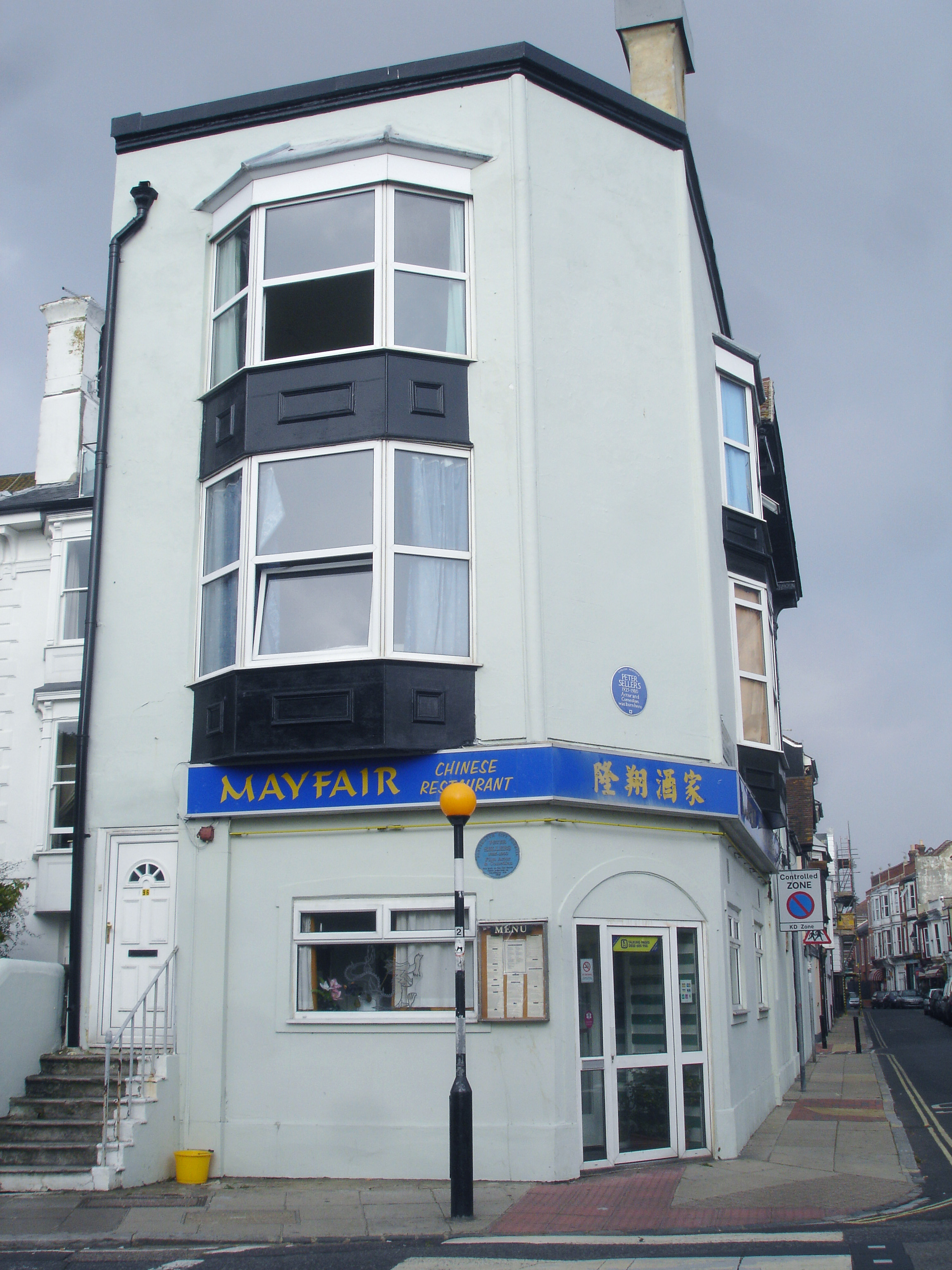

Sellers was born on 8 September 1925 in Southsea, a suburb of Portsmouth. His parents were Yorkshire-born William "Bill" Sellers and Agnes Doreen "Peg" (née Marks). Both were variety entertainers; Peg was in the Ray Sisters troupe. Although he was christened Richard Henry, his parents called him Peter, after his elder brother, who was stillborn. Sellers had no other siblings. Peg Sellers was related to the pugilist Daniel Mendoza, whom Sellers greatly revered and an engraving of whom later hung in his office. At one time, Sellers planned to use Mendoza's image for his production company's logo.

Sellers was two weeks old when he was carried on stage by Dick Henderson, the headline act at the Kings Theatre, Southsea: the crowd sang "For He's a Jolly Good Fellow", which caused the infant to cry. The family constantly toured, causing much upheaval and unhappiness in the young Sellers's life.

Sellers maintained a very close relationship with his mother, which his friend Spike Milligan later considered unhealthy for a grown man. Sellers's agent, Dennis Selinger, recalled his first meeting with Peg and Peter Sellers, noting that "Sellers was an immensely shy young man, inclined to be dominated by his mother, but without resentment or objection". As an only child, he spent much time alone.

In 1935, the Sellers family moved to North London and settled in Muswell Hill. Although Bill Sellers was a Protestant and Peg was Jewish, Sellers attended the nearby Roman Catholic school St Aloysius' College in Highgate, run by the Brothers of Our Lady of Mercy. The family was not rich, but Peg insisted on an expensive private schooling for her son. According to biographer Peter Evans, Sellers was fascinated, puzzled, and worried by religion from a young age, particularly Catholicism; Roger Lewis believed that soon after entering Catholic school, Sellers "discovered he was a Jew—he was someone on the outside of the mysteries of faith". Later in his life, Sellers observed that while his father's faith was according to the Church of England, his mother was Jewish, "and Jews take the faith of their mother."

According to Milligan, Sellers felt a sense of guilt about being Jewish and recalls that Sellers was once reduced to tears when he presented him with a candlestick from a synagogue for Christmas, believing the gesture to be an anti-Jewish slur. Sellers became a top student at the school, excelling in drawing in particular. He was prone to laziness, but his natural talents shielded him from criticism by his teachers. Sellers recalled that a teacher scolded the other boys for not studying, saying: "The Jewish boy knows his catechism better than the rest of you!" (Note: The film critic Kenneth Tynan noted that Sellers's ambition as an actor was fuelled mainly by "his hatred of antisemitism." This may have spurred his determination to become a great actor or director.)

Accompanying his family on the variety show circuit, Sellers learned stagecraft but received conflicting encouragement from his parents and developed mixed feelings about show business. His father doubted Sellers's abilities in the entertainment field, even suggesting that his son's talents were only enough to become a road sweeper, while Sellers's mother encouraged him continuously. While at St Aloysius' College, Sellers began to develop his improvisational skills. He and his closest friend at the time, Bryan Connon, both enjoyed listening to early radio comedy shows. Connon remembers that "Peter got endless pleasure imitating the people in Monday Night at Eight. He had a gift for improvising dialogue. Sketches, too. I'd be the 'straight man', the 'feed', ... I'd cue Peter and he'd do all the radio personalities and chuck in a few voices of his own invention as well."

=== 1939–1945: War years ===
With the outbreak of the Second World War, St Aloysius' College was evacuated to Cambridgeshire. Because his mother did not allow Sellers to go, his formal education ended at fourteen. Early in 1940, the family moved to the north Devon town of Ilfracombe, where Sellers's maternal uncle managed the Victoria Palace Theatre; Sellers got his first job at the theatre, aged fifteen, starting as a caretaker. He was steadily promoted, becoming a box office clerk, usher, assistant stage manager, and lighting operator. He was also offered some small acting parts. Working backstage gave him a chance to study actors such as Paul Scofield. He became close friends with Derek Altman, and together they launched Sellers's first stage act under the name "Altman and Sellers", consisting of playing ukuleles, singing, and telling jokes.

During his backstage theatre job, Sellers began practising on a set of drums that belonged to the band Joe Daniels and his Hot Shots. Daniels noticed his efforts and gave him practical instructions. The instrument greatly suited Sellers's temperament and artistic skills. Spike Milligan later noted that Sellers was very proficient on the drums and might have remained a jazz drummer had he lacked his skills in mimicry and improvisation. As the war progressed, Sellers continued to develop his drumming skills and played with a series of touring bands, including those of Oscar Rabin, Henry Hall, and Waldini, as well as his father's quartet, before he left and joined a band from Blackpool. Sellers became a member of the Entertainments National Service Association (ENSA), which provided entertainment for British forces and factory workers during the war. Sellers also performed comedy routines at these concerts, including impersonations of George Formby, with Sellers accompanying his own singing on ukulele.

In September 1943 he joined the Royal Air Force, although it is unclear whether he volunteered or was conscripted; his mother unsuccessfully tried to have him deferred on medical grounds. Sellers wanted to become a pilot, but his poor eyesight restricted him to ground staff duties. He found these duties dull, so he auditioned for Squadron Leader Ralph Reader's RAF Gang Show entertainment troupe. Reader accepted him and Sellers toured the UK before the troupe was transferred to India. His tour also included Ceylon and Burma, although the duration of his stay in Asia is unknown, and Sellers may have exaggerated its length. He also served in Germany and France after the war. According to David Lodge, who became friends with Sellers, he was "one of the best performers ever" on the drums and developed a fine ability to impersonate military officers during this period.

=== 1946–1954: Early post-war work, The Goon Show, and first marriage ===
In 1946 Sellers made his final show with ENSA, starring in the pantomime Jack and the Beanstalk at the Théâtre Marigny in Paris. He was posted back to England shortly afterwards to work at the Air Ministry and demobilised later that year. On resuming his theatrical career, Sellers could get only sporadic work. He was dismissed after one performance of a comedy routine in Peterborough; the headline act, Welsh vocalist Dorothy Squires, however, persuaded the management to reinstate him. Sellers also continued his drumming and was billed on his appearance at The Hippodrome in Aldershot as "Britain's answer to Gene Krupa". In March 1948 Sellers gained a six-week run at the Windmill Theatre in London, which predominantly staged revue acts; he provided the comedy turns between the nude shows on offer.

Sellers wrote to the BBC in 1948 and was subsequently auditioned. As a result, he made his television debut on 18 March 1948 in New To You. His act, largely based on impressions, was well received, and he returned the following week. Frustrated with the slow pace of his career, Sellers telephoned BBC radio producer Roy Speer, pretending to be Kenneth Horne, star of the radio show Much-Binding-in-the-Marsh. Speer called Sellers a "cheeky young sod" for his efforts but gave him an audition. This led to his brief appearance on 1 July 1948 on ShowTime and subsequently to work on Ray's a Laugh with comedian Ted Ray. In October 1948, Sellers was a regular radio performer, appearing in Starlight Hour, The Gang Show, Henry Hall's Guest Night and It's Fine To Be Young.

By the end of 1948, the BBC Third Programme began to broadcast the comedy series Third Division, which starred, among others, Harry Secombe, Michael Bentine, and Sellers. One evening, Sellers and Bentine visited the Hackney Empire, where Secombe was performing, and Bentine introduced Sellers to Spike Milligan. The four would meet up at Grafton's public house near Victoria, owned by Jimmy Grafton, who was also a BBC scriptwriter. The four comedians dubbed him KOGVOS (Keeper of Goons and Voice of Sanity). (Note: The meaning of the acronym KOGVOS was flexible: it has also been defined as "King of Goons and Voice of Sanity" and "King of the Goons Voices Society".) Grafton later edited some of the early episodes of The Goon Show.

Sellers (top) with fellow cast members Spike Milligan (left) and Harry Secombe (right) in a publicity shot for the BBC's The Goon Show

In 1949 Sellers started to date Anne Howe, (Note: Her maiden name was Anne Howe, while her professional name was Anne Hayes.) an Australian actress who lived in London. He proposed to her in April 1950, and the couple were married in London on 15 September 1951; their son, Michael, was born on 2 April 1954, and their daughter, Sarah, followed on 16 October 1957. Sellers's introduction to film work came in 1950, when he dubbed the voice of Alfonso Bedoya in The Black Rose. He continued to work with Bentine, Milligan, and Secombe. On 3 February 1951, they made a trial tape entitled The Goons and sent it to the BBC producer Pat Dixon, who eventually accepted it. The first Goon Show was broadcast on 28 May 1951. Against their wishes, the show was initially titled Crazy People, but was formally changed to their intended title, The Goon Show, in 1952.

Sellers appeared until the last programme of the ten-series run, broadcast on 28 January 1960. Sellers played four main characters—Major Bloodnok, Hercules Grytpype-Thynne, Bluebottle, and Henry Crun—and seventeen minor ones. Starting with 370,000 listeners, the show eventually reached up to seven million people in Britain and was described by one newspaper as "probably the most influential comedy show of all time". For Sellers, the BBC considers it had the effect of launching his career "on the road to stardom".

In 1951 the Goons made their feature film debut in Penny Points to Paradise. Sellers and Milligan then wrote the script for Let's Go Crazy, the earliest film to showcase Sellers's ability to portray a series of different characters within the same film, and he made another appearance opposite his Goons co-stars in the 1952 flop, Down Among the Z Men. In 1954, Sellers was cast opposite Sid James, Tony Hancock, Raymond Huntley, Donald Pleasence, and Eric Sykes in the British Lion Film Corporation comedy production, Orders Are Orders. John Grierson believes that this was Sellers's breakthrough role on screen and credits this film with launching the film careers of both Sellers and Hancock.

=== 1955–1959: The Ladykillers, The Mouse That Roared, I'm All Right Jack, and other early films ===
The first real film I made was The Ladykillers. I used to watch Alec Guinness, who is an absolute idol of mine, do everything, his rehearsals, his scenes, everything. He is my ideal ... and my idol.

— Sellers on studying Sir Alec Guinness during the filming of The Ladykillers

Sellers pursued a film career and took a number of small roles, such as a police officer in John and Julie (1955). He accepted a larger part in the 1955 Alexander Mackendrick-directed Ealing comedy The Ladykillers, in which he starred opposite his idol Alec Guinness, in addition to Herbert Lom and Cecil Parker. Sellers portrayed Harry Robinson, the Teddy Boy; biographer Peter Evans considers this Sellers's first good role. The Ladykillers was a success in the UK and the US, and the film was nominated for an Academy Award for Best Original Screenplay. The following year Sellers appeared in a further three television comedy series with one of his Goon Show co-stars, Spike Milligan: The Idiot Weekly, Price 2d, A Show Called Fred, and Son of Fred. The shows aired on Britain's new ITV channel.

In 1957 film producer Michael Relph, impressed with Sellers's portrayal of an elderly character in Idiot Weekly, cast the 32-year-old actor as a 68-year-old projectionist in Basil Dearden's The Smallest Show on Earth, supporting Bill Travers, Virginia McKenna, and Margaret Rutherford. The film was a commercial success and is now thought of as a minor classic of post-war British screen comedy. Sellers provided the growling voice of Winston Churchill to the BAFTA award-winning film The Man Who Never Was. Later in 1957 Sellers portrayed a television star with a talent for disguises in Mario Zampi's offbeat black comedy The Naked Truth, opposite Terry-Thomas, Peggy Mount, Shirley Eaton, and Dennis Price.

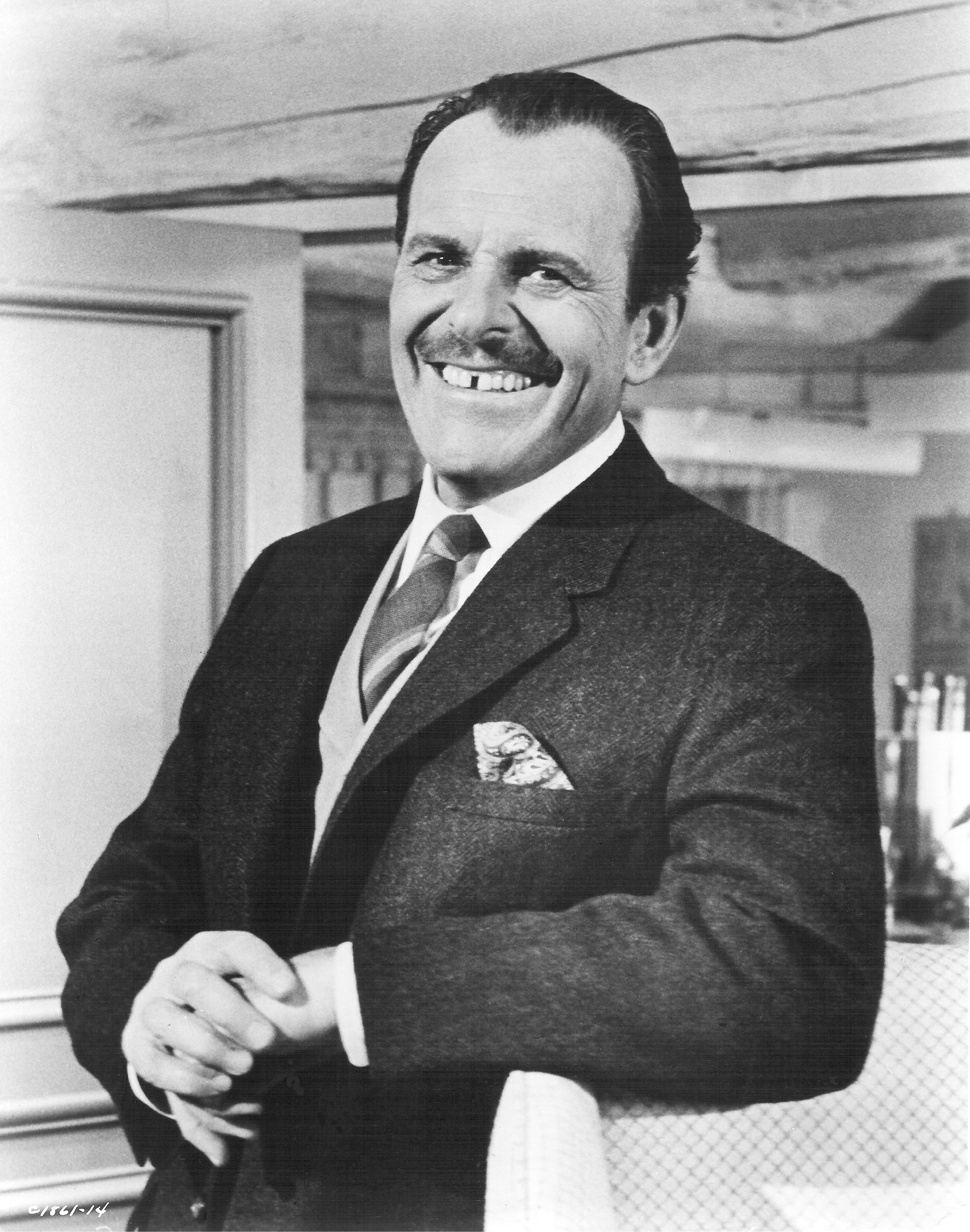
Terry-Thomas (pictured in 1968) starred with Sellers in four films between 1957 and 1959. Their last film together, I'm All Right Jack – the highest-grossing film at the British box office in 1960 – saw Sellers receive the BAFTA Award for Best British Actor.

Sellers's difficulties in getting his film career to take off and increasing problems in his personal life prompted him to seek periodic consultations with astrologer Maurice Woodruff, who held considerable sway over his later career. After a chance meeting with a North American Indian spirit guide in the 1950s, Sellers became convinced that the music hall comedian Dan Leno, who had died in 1904, haunted him and guided his career and life decisions. Sellers was a member of the Grand Order of Water Rats, the exclusive theatrical fraternity founded by Leno in 1890. In 1958 Sellers starred with David Tomlinson, Wilfrid Hyde-White, David Lodge, and Lionel Jeffries as a chief petty officer in Val Guest's Up the Creek.

Guest later said he had written and directed the film as a vehicle for Sellers and thus had started Sellers's film career. To practise his voice, Sellers purchased a reel-to-reel tape recorder. The film received critical acclaim in the United States, and Roger Lewis viewed it as an important practice ground for Sellers. Next, Sellers featured with Terry-Thomas as one of a pair of comic villains in George Pal's Tom Thumb (1958), a musical fantasy film, opposite Russ Tamblyn, Jessie Matthews, and Peter Butterworth. Terry-Thomas later said that "my part was perfect, but Peter's was bloody awful. He wasn't difficult about it, but he knew it". The performance was a landmark in Sellers's career and became his first contact with the Hollywood film industry.

Sellers released his first album in 1958 called The Best of Sellers: a collection of comic songs and sketches, among them Balham - Gateway to the South, where Sellers plays a variety of comic characters. Produced by George Martin and released on Parlophone, the album reached number three in the UK Albums Chart. The same year, Sellers made his first film with John and Roy Boulting in Carlton-Browne of the F.O., a comedy in which he played a supporting role for the film's lead, Terry-Thomas. Before the release of that film, the Boultings, along with Sellers and Thomas in the cast, started filming I'm All Right Jack, which became the highest-grossing film at the British box office in 1960. In preparation for his role as Fred Kite, Sellers watched footage of union officials. The role earned him a BAFTA, and the critic for The Manchester Guardian believed it was Sellers's best screen performance to date. In between Carlton-Browne of the F.O. and I'm All Right Jack, Sellers starred in The Mouse That Roared, a film in which Jean Seberg also appeared and was directed by Jack Arnold. He played three distinct leading roles: the elderly Grand Duchess, the ambitious Prime Minister, and the innocent and clumsy farm boy selected to lead an invasion of the United States. The film received high praise from critics.

After completing I'm All Right Jack, Sellers returned to record a new series of The Goon Show. Over the course of two weekends, he took his 16mm cine-camera to Totteridge Lane in London and filmed himself, Spike Milligan, Mario Fabrizi, Leo McKern, and Richard Lester. Originally intended as a private film, the eleven-minute Running Jumping & Standing Still Film was screened at the 1959 Edinburgh and San Francisco film festivals. It won the award for best fiction short in the latter festival and received an Academy Award nomination for Best Short Subject (Live Action). In 1959, Sellers released his second album, Songs for Swingin' Sellers, which—like his first record—reached number three in the UK Albums Chart. Sellers's last film of the 1950s was The Battle of the Sexes, a comedy directed by Charles Crichton.

=== 1960–1963: The Millionairess, Lolita, first divorce, and The Pink Panther ===
In early 1960, Sellers starred as "Dodger" Lane in the prison comedy Two Way Stretch. Later that year, he portrayed an Indian doctor, Dr Ahmed el Kabir, in Anthony Asquith's romantic comedy The Millionairess, a film based on a George Bernard Shaw play of the same name. Sellers was not interested in the role until he learned that Sophia Loren would be his co-star. When asked about Loren, he explained to reporters, "I don't normally act with romantic, glamorous women ... She's a lot different from Harry Secombe." Sellers and Loren developed such a close relationship during filming, he declared his love for her in front of his wife at the time, Anne Howe, and woke his son one night to ask if he should divorce from Howe. There is uncertainty whether the relationship was anything more than platonic: a number of people, including Spike Milligan, consider it an affair, while others, including Graham Stark, think it remained only a strong friendship. Anne Howe afterwards commented, "I don't know to this day whether he had an affair with her. Nobody does."

Roger Lewis observed that Sellers immersed himself completely in the characters he enacted during productions, that "He'd play a role as an Indian doctor, and for the next six months, he'd be an Indian in his real [daily] life." The film inspired the George Martin-produced novelty hit single "Goodness Gracious Me", with Sellers and Loren, which reached number four in the UK Singles Chart in November 1960. A follow-up single by the duo, "Bangers and Mash", reached number 22 in the UK chart. The songs were included on an album released by the couple, Peter & Sophia, which reached number five in the UK Albums Chart. That year he also appeared in Never Let Go (1960), playing a straight villain part.

In 1961, Sellers made his directorial debut with Mr. Topaze, in which he also starred. The film was based on the Marcel Pagnol play Topaze. Sellers portrayed an ex-schoolmaster in a small French town who turns to a life of crime to obtain wealth. The film and Sellers's directorial abilities received unenthusiastic responses from the public and critics, and Sellers rarely referred to it again. The same year, he starred in the Sidney Gilliat-directed Only Two Can Play, a film based on the novel That Uncertain Feeling by Kingsley Amis. He was nominated for the Best British Actor award at the 16th British Academy Film Awards for his role as John Lewis, a frustrated Welsh librarian whose affections swing between the glamorous Liz (Mai Zetterling) and his long-suffering wife Jean (Virginia Maskell).

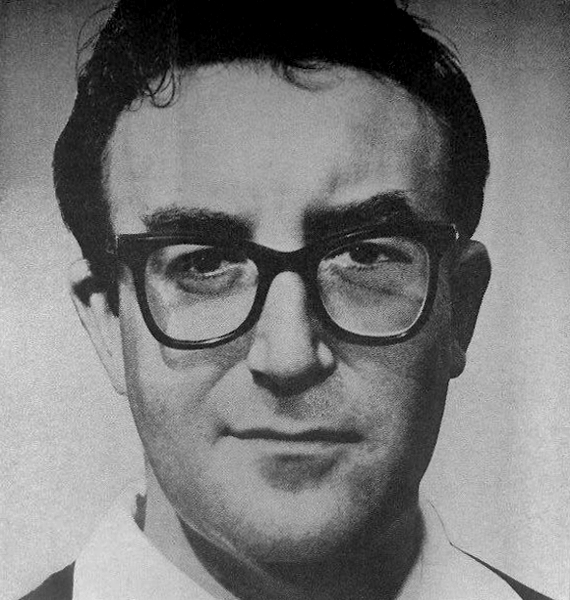
Picture of Sellers used in a road safety advertisement endorsed by the Royal Society for the Prevention of Accidents in August 1962

In 1962, Sellers played a retired British army general in John Guillermin's Waltz of the Toreadors, based on the play of the same name. The film was widely criticised for its slapstick cinematic adaptation, and director Guillermin himself considered the film "amateurish". However, Sellers won the San Sebastián International Film Festival Award for Best Actor and a BAFTA award nomination for his performance, and it was well received by the critics. Stanley Kubrick asked Sellers to play the role of Clare Quilty in the 1962 film Lolita, opposite James Mason and Shelley Winters. Kubrick had seen Sellers in The Battle of the Sexes and listened to the album The Best of Sellers, and was impressed by the range of characters he could portray.

Sellers was apprehensive about accepting the role, doubting his ability to successfully portray the part of a flamboyant American television playwright who was, according to Sellers, "a fantastic nightmare, part homosexual, part drug addict, part sadist". Kubrick encouraged Sellers to improvise and stated that he often reached a "state of comic ecstasy". Kubrick had American jazz producer Norman Granz record portions of the script for Sellers to listen to, so he could study the voice and develop confidence, granting Sellers a free artistic licence. Sellers later claimed that his relationship with Kubrick became one of the most rewarding of his career. Writing in The Sunday Times, Dilys Powell commented that Sellers gave "a firework performance, funny, malicious, only once for a few seconds overreaching itself, and in the murder scene which is both prologue and epilogue achieving the macabre in comedy."

Towards the end of 1962, Sellers appeared in The Dock Brief, a legal satire directed by James Hill and co-starring Richard Attenborough. Sellers's behaviour towards his family worsened in 1962. On one occasion, he asked his son Michael and his daughter Sarah which parent they loved more; neither mentioned him alone, so they were thrown out and disowned. At the end of the year, his marriage to Anne broke down. (Note: The decree nisi was granted in March 1963 and Anne married Elias 'Ted' Levy in October the same year.)

Sellers as Inspector Clouseau in The Pink Panther (1963)

In 1963, Sellers starred as gang leader "Pearly Gates" in Cliff Owen's The Wrong Arm of the Law, followed by his portrayal of a vicar in Heavens Above!

Sellers was approached by director Blake Edwards to play the role of Inspector Clouseau in The Pink Panther after Peter Ustinov had backed out of the film. Edwards later recalled his feelings as "desperately unhappy and ready to kill, but as fate would have it, I got Mr. Sellers instead of Mr. Ustinov—thank God!" Sellers accepted a fee of £90,000 (£950,000 in 2025 pounds) for five weeks' work on location in Rome and Cortina. The film starred David Niven in the principal role, with two other actors—Capucine and Claudia Cardinale—having more prominent roles than Sellers. However, Sellers's performance is regarded as being on par with that of Charlie Chaplin and Buster Keaton, according to biographer Peter Evans. Although the Clouseau character was in the script, Sellers created the personality, devising the costume, accent, make-up, moustache and trench coat.

The Pink Panther was released in the UK in January 1964 and received a mixed reception from the critics, although Penelope Gilliatt, writing in The Observer, remarked that Sellers had a "flawless sense of mistiming" in a performance that was "one of the most delicate studies in accident-proneness since the silents". Despite the views of the critics, the film was one of the top ten grossing films of the year. The role earned Sellers a nomination for the Golden Globe Award for Best Actor in a Motion Picture – Musical or Comedy at the 22nd Golden Globe Awards and for a Best British Actor award at the 18th British Academy Film Awards.

I'll play Clouseau with great dignity, because he thinks of himself as one of the world's best detectives. Even when he comes a cropper, he must pick himself up with that notion intact. The original script makes him out to be a complete idiot. I think a forgivable vanity would humanize him and make him kind of touching. It's as if filmgoers are kept one fall ahead of him.

— Sellers on portraying Clouseau.

=== 1963–1965: Dr. Strangelove, A Shot in the Dark, health problems, and second marriage ===
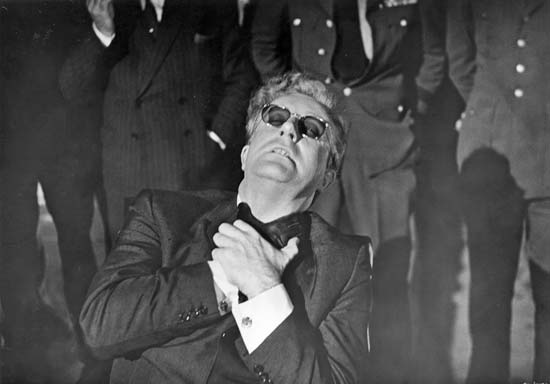
Sellers in Dr. Strangelove (1964)

In 1963, Stanley Kubrick cast Sellers to appear in Dr. Strangelove or: How I Learned to Stop Worrying and Love the Bomb alongside George C. Scott, Sterling Hayden, Keenan Wynn and Slim Pickens. Sellers and Kubrick got along famously during the film's production and had the greatest respect for each other, also sharing a love of photography. The director asked Sellers to play four roles: US President Merkin Muffley, Dr. Strangelove, US Air Force Major T. J. "King" Kong, and Group Captain Lionel Mandrake of the RAF. Sellers was initially hesitant about taking on these divergent characters, but Kubrick prevailed. According to some accounts, Sellers was also invited to play the part of General Buck Turgidson but turned it down because it was too physically demanding. Kubrick later commented that the idea of having Sellers in so many of the film's key roles was that "everywhere you turn there is some version of Peter Sellers holding the fate of the world in his hands". Sellers was especially anxious about believably portraying Kong; he was unsure of his ability to speak in a Texan accent. Kubrick requested screenwriter Terry Southern to record in his natural accent a tape of Kong's lines. After practising with Southern's recording, Sellers got sufficient control of the accent and started shooting the scenes in the aeroplane.

After the first day's shooting, Sellers sprained his ankle while leaving a restaurant and could no longer work in the cramped cockpit set. Kubrick then re-cast Slim Pickens as Kong. The three roles Sellers undertook were distinct, "variegated, complex and refined", and critic Alexander Walker considered that these roles "showed his genius at full stretch". Sellers played Muffley as a bland, placid intellectual in the mould of Adlai Stevenson; he played Mandrake as an unflappable Englishman; and Dr. Strangelove, a character influenced by pre-war German cinema, as a wheelchair-using fanatic. The critic for The Times wrote that the film includes "three remarkable performances from Mr. Peter Sellers, masterly as the President, diverting as a revue-sketch ex-Nazi US Scientist ... and acceptable as an RAF officer," although the critic from The Guardian thought his portrayal of the RAF officer alone was "worth the price of an admission ticket". For his performance in all three roles, Sellers was nominated for an Academy Award for Best Actor at the 37th Academy Awards and the Best British Actor award at the 18th British Academy Film Awards.

Between November 1963 and February 1964, Sellers filmed A Shot in the Dark, an adaptation of a French play, L'Idiote by Marcel Achard. Sellers found the part and the director, Anatole Litvak, uninspiring; the producers brought in Blake Edwards to replace Litvak. Together with writer William Peter Blatty, they turned the script into a Pink Panther follow-up comedy, with Sellers as Inspector Clouseau, also adding Herbert Lom as Commissioner Dreyfus and Burt Kwouk as Cato. During filming, Sellers's relationship with Edwards became strained; the two would often stop speaking to each other during filming, communicating only by the passing of notes. Sellers's personality was described by others as difficult and demanding, and he often clashed with fellow actors and directors. Upon its release in late June 1964, Bosley Crowther noted the "joyously free and facile way" in which Sellers had developed his comedy technique.

I feel extremely vulnerable, and I need help a lot. A lot. I suppose I feel mainly I need the help of a woman. I'm continually searching for this woman. They mother you, they're great in bed, they're like a sister, they're there when you want to see them, they're not there when you don't. I don't know where they are. Maybe they're around somewhere. I'll find one, one of these days.

— Sellers on his need for women.
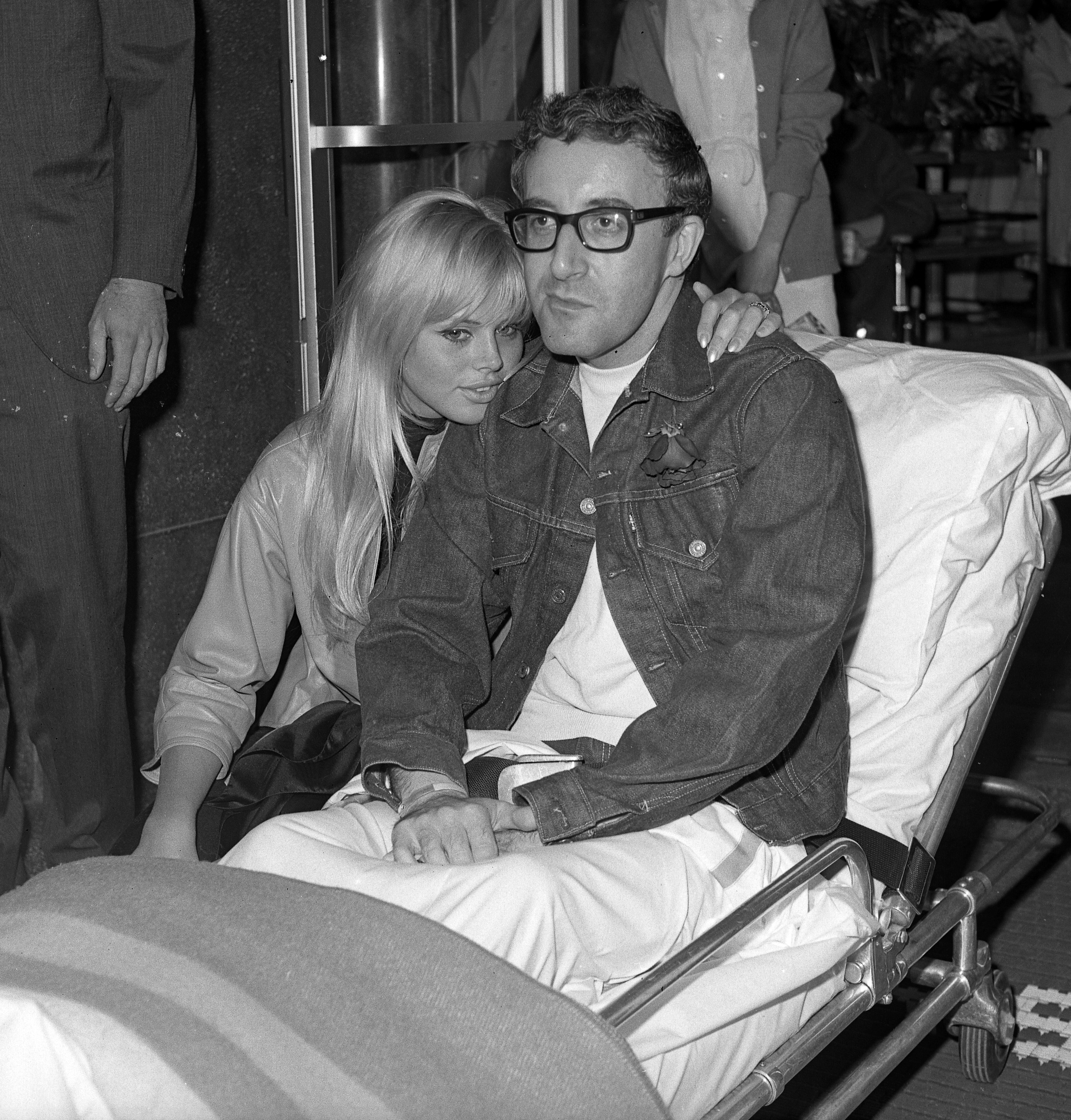
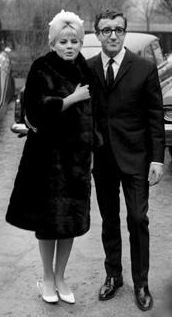
Sellers with his second wife Britt Ekland in 1964

Towards the end of filming, in early February 1964, Sellers met Britt Ekland, a Swedish actress who had arrived in London to film Guns at Batasi. On 19 February 1964, just ten days after their first meeting, the couple married. Sellers soon showed signs of insecurity and paranoia; he would become highly anxious and jealous, for example, when Ekland starred opposite attractive men. Shortly after the wedding, Sellers started filming on location in Twentynine Palms, California, for Billy Wilder's Kiss Me, Stupid, opposite Dean Martin and Kim Novak. The relationship between Wilder and Sellers became strained; both had different approaches to work and often clashed as a result. On the night of 5 April 1964, prior to having sex with Ekland, Sellers inhaled amyl nitrite (poppers) as a sexual stimulant in his search for "the ultimate orgasm" and suffered a series of eight heart attacks over the course of three hours as a result. His illness forced him to withdraw from the filming of Kiss Me, Stupid and he was replaced by Ray Walston. Wilder was unsympathetic about the heart attacks, saying that "you have to have a heart before you can have an attack".

After some time recovering, Sellers returned to filming in October 1964, playing King of the Individualists alongside Ekland in Carol for Another Christmas, (Note: The character may have been called Imperial Me, according to The New York Times.) a feature-length special broadcast in the United States on the ABC network on 28 December 1964, designed to promote the United Nations. Sellers had been concerned that his heart attacks might have caused brain damage and that he would be unable to remember his lines, but he was reassured that his memory and abilities were unimpaired after the experience of filming.

=== 1965–1969: What's New Pussycat?, Casino Royale, The Party, and second divorce ===
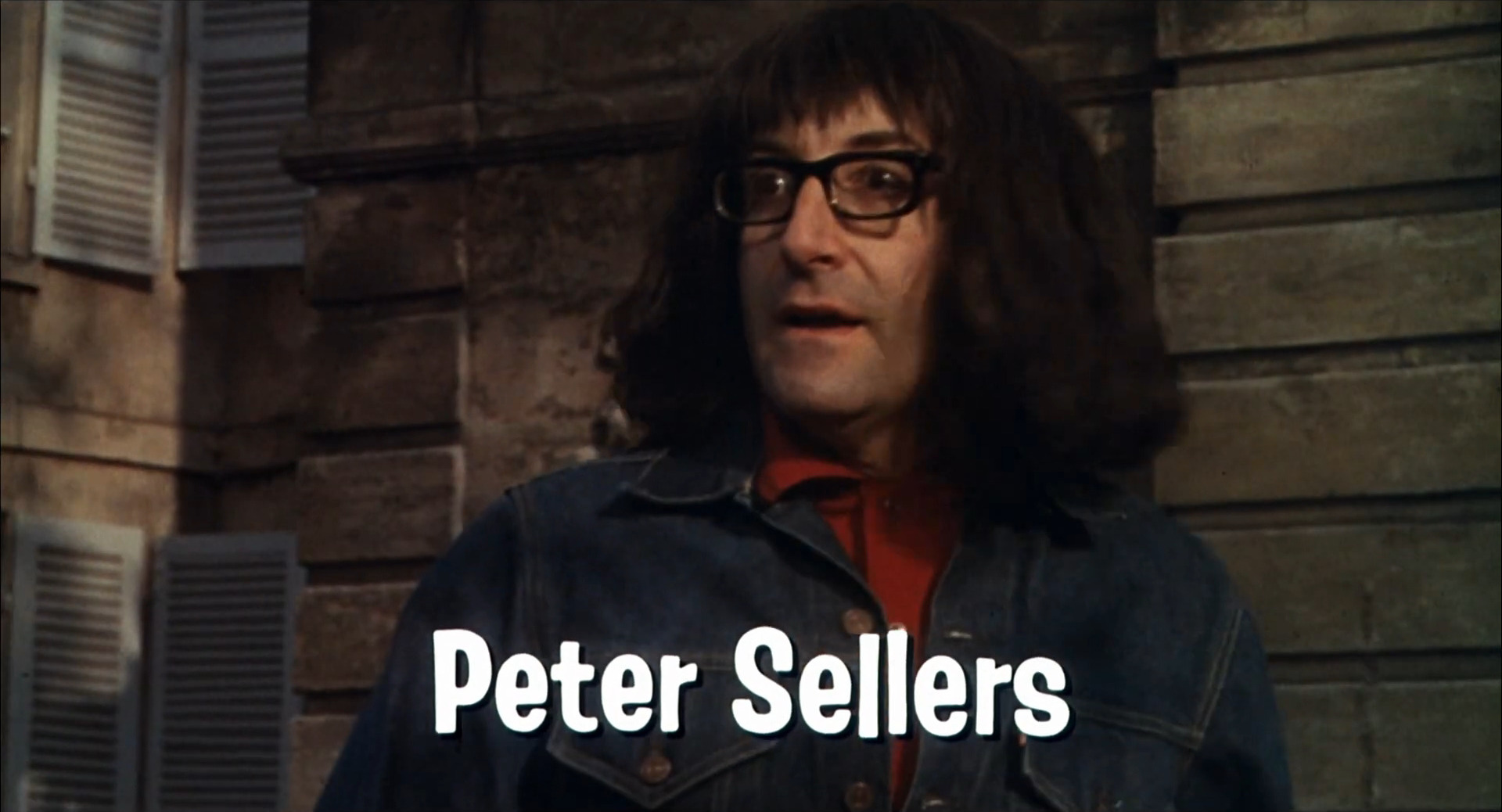
Sellers in What's New Pussycat? (1965)

Sellers's next role was the perverted Austrian psychoanalyst Doctor Fritz Fassbender in Clive Donner's What's New Pussycat?, appearing alongside Peter O'Toole, Romy Schneider, Capucine, Paula Prentiss and Ursula Andress. The film was the first screenwriting and acting credit for Woody Allen and featured Sellers in a love triangle. Because of Sellers's poor health, producer Charles K. Feldman insured him at a cost of $360,000 ($3,700,000 in 2025 dollars).

On 20 January 1965, Sellers and Ekland announced the birth of a daughter, Victoria. They moved to Rome in May to film After the Fox, an Anglo-Italian production in which they were both to appear. The film was directed by Vittorio De Sica, whose English Sellers struggled to understand. Sellers attempted to have De Sica fired, causing tensions on the set. Sellers also became unhappy with his wife's performance, straining their relationship and triggering open arguments, during one of which Sellers threw a chair at Ekland. Despite these conflicts, the script was praised for its wit.

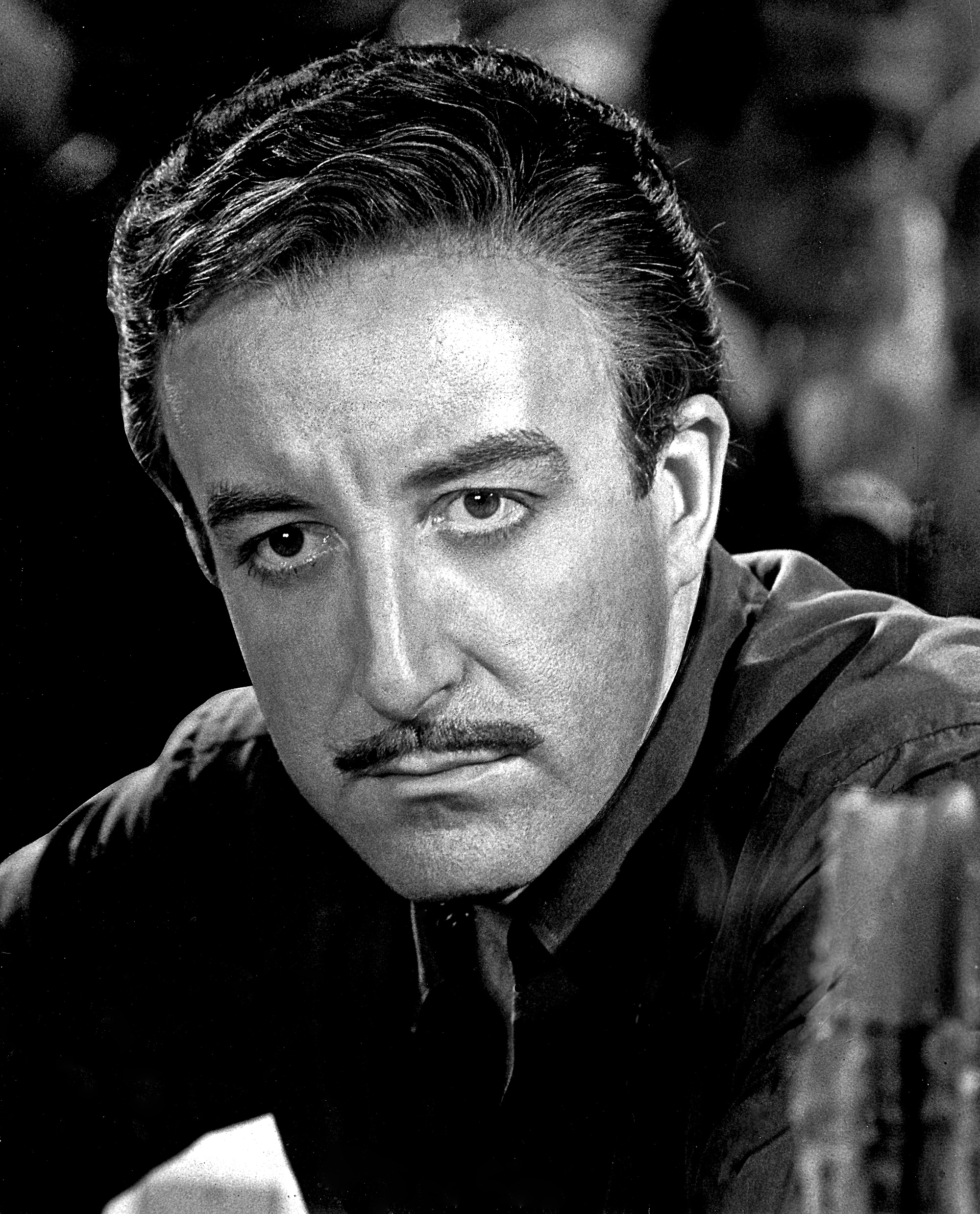
Sellers in After the Fox (1966)

Following the commercial success of What's New Pussycat?, Charles Feldman again brought together Sellers and Woody Allen for his next project, Casino Royale, which also starred Orson Welles; Sellers signed a $1 million contract for the film ($9,700,000 in 2025 dollars). Seven screenwriters worked on the project, and filming was chaotic. To make matters worse, according to Ekland, Sellers was "so insecure, he won't trust anyone". A poor working relationship quickly developed between Sellers and Welles: Sellers eventually demanded that the two should not share the same set. Sellers left the film before his part was complete. A further agent's part was then written for Terence Cooper, to cover Sellers's departure. (Note: Various theories have been given about the animosity between the two actors, including Sellers trying to get Welles to laugh and Welles not responding; Sellers hearing a young woman comment that Welles was sexy; Sellers's comments about Welles's weight being objected to; and Sellers's jealousy at Welles's friendship with Princess Margaret, who was also a friend of Sellers. Sellers's biographer Peter Evans declared that, "the real reason for this ... hostility is still uncertain", while another biographer, Ed Sikov commented that others were as much to blame for problems with the film.)

Shortly after leaving Casino Royale, Sellers was appointed a Commander of the Most Excellent Order of the British Empire (CBE) in honour of his career achievements. The day before the investiture at Buckingham Palace, Sellers and Ekland argued, with Ekland scratching his face in the process; Sellers had a make-up artist cover the marks. During his next film, The Bobo, which again co-starred Ekland, the couple's marital problems worsened. Three weeks into production in Italy, Sellers told director Robert Parrish to fire his wife, saying, "I'm not coming back after lunch if that bitch is on the set". Ekland later stated that the marriage was "an atrocious sham" at this stage. In the midst of filming The Bobo, Sellers's mother had a heart attack; Parrish asked Sellers if he wanted to visit her in hospital, but Sellers remained on set. She died within days, without Sellers having seen her. He was deeply affected by her death and remorseful at not having returned to London to see her. Ekland served him with divorce papers shortly afterwards. The divorce was finalised on 18 December 1968, and Sellers's friend Spike Milligan sent Ekland a congratulatory telegram. Upon its release in September 1967, The Bobo was poorly received.

Sellers's first film appearance of 1968 was a reunion with Blake Edwards for the fish-out-of-water comedy The Party, in which he starred alongside Claudine Longet and Denny Miller. He appears as Hrundi V. Bakshi, a bungling Indian actor who accidentally receives an invitation to a lavish Hollywood dinner party. His character, according to Sellers's biographer Peter Evans, was "clearly an amalgam of Clouseau and the doctor in The Millionairess". Roger Lewis notes that, like a number of Sellers's characters, he is played in a sympathetic and dignified manner. He followed it later that year with Hy Averback's I Love You, Alice B. Toklas, playing an attorney who abandons his lifestyle to become a hippie. Roger Ebert of the Chicago Sun-Times gave the film three stars, remarking that Sellers was "back doing what he does best", although he also said that in Sellers's previous films he had "been at his worst recently".

In 1969, Sellers starred opposite Ringo Starr in the Joseph McGrath-directed film The Magic Christian. Sellers portrayed Sir Guy Grand, an eccentric billionaire who plays elaborate practical jokes on people. The critic Irv Slifkin remarked that the film was a reflection of the cynicism of Peter Sellers, describing the film as a "proto-Pythonesque adaptation of Terry Southern's semi-free-form short novel" and "one of the strangest films to be shown at a gala premiere for Britain's royal family". The film, a satire on human nature, was in general viewed negatively by critics. Roger Greenspun of The New York Times believed that the film was of variable quality and summarised it as a "brutal satire".

=== 1970–1978: "Period of indifference": two marriages and three Pink Panther films ===
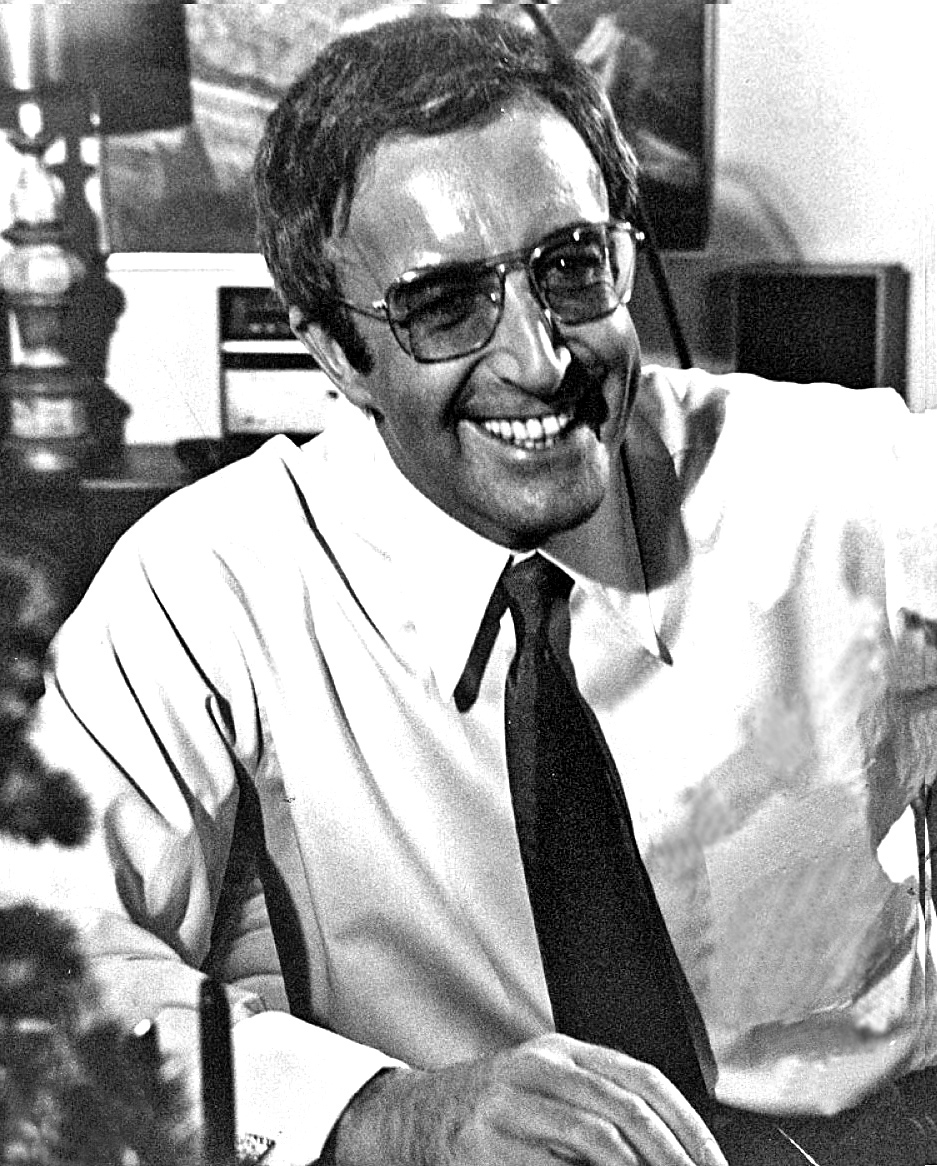
Sellers in 1971

After a cameo appearance in A Day at the Beach (1970) (under the pseudonym "A. Queen") and a serious role later in 1970 as an ageing businessman who seduces Sinéad Cusack in Hoffman, Sellers starred in Roy Boulting's There's a Girl in My Soup opposite Goldie Hawn. According to The Times, the film was a major commercial success and became the seventh most popular film at the British box office in 1970. Andrew Spicer, writing for the British Film Institute's Screenonline, considers that although Sellers favoured playing romantic roles, he "was always more successful in parts that sent up his own vanities and pretensions, as with the TV presenter and narcissistic lothario" he played in There's a Girl in My Soup. The film was seen as a small revival of his career.

Sellers's next films, including Rod Amateau's Where Does It Hurt? (1972) and Peter Medak's Ghost in the Noonday Sun (1974), were again poorly received, and his acting was viewed as frenetic rather than funny. Despite these setbacks, Sellers won the Best Actor award at the 1973 Tehran Film Festival for his tragi-comedic role as a street performer in Anthony Simmons's The Optimists of Nine Elms. Fellow comedian and friend Spike Milligan believed that the early 1970s were for Sellers "a period of indifference, and it would appear at one time that his career might have come to a conclusion". This was echoed by Sellers's biographer, Peter Evans, who notes that out of nine films in the period, three were never released and five had flopped, while only There's a Girl in My Soup had been a success. In his private life, he had been seeing the 23-year-old model Miranda Quarry. The couple married on 24 August 1970, despite Sellers's private doubts—expressed to his agent, Dennis Selinger—about his decision to remarry.

In April 1972, Sellers reunited with Milligan and Harry Secombe to record The Last Goon Show of All, which was broadcast on 5 October. In May 1973, with his third marriage failing, Sellers went to the theatre to watch Liza Minnelli perform. He became entranced with Minnelli, and the couple became engaged three days later, despite Minnelli's then-current betrothal to Desi Arnaz Jr. and Sellers still being married. (Note: The marriage to Quarry was formally dissolved in September 1974.) Their relationship lasted a month before breaking up. By 1974, Sellers's friends were concerned that he was having a nervous breakdown. Directors John and Roy Boulting considered that Sellers was "a deeply troubled man, distrustful, self-absorbed, ultimately self-destructive. He was the complete contradiction." Sellers was shy and insecure when out of character. When he was invited to appear on Michael Parkinson's eponymous chat show in 1974, he withdrew the day before, explaining to Parkinson that "I just can't walk on as myself". When he was told he could come on as someone else, he appeared dressed as a member of the Gestapo. After a few lines in keeping with his assumed character, he stepped out of the role and settled down and, according to Parkinson himself, "was brilliant, giving the audience an astonishing display of his virtuosity". In 1974, Sellers again claimed to have communicated with the long-dead music hall comic Dan Leno, who advised him to return to the role of Clouseau.

By the mid-1970s, Sellers was agreeing to accept salaries of £100,000 and 10 per cent of the gross to appear in TV productions and advertisements, well below the £1 million he had once commanded per film. In 1973, he appeared in a Benson & Hedges cinema commercial; in 1975, he appeared in a series of advertisements for Trans World Airlines, in which he played several eccentric characters, including Thrifty McTravel, Jeremy "Piggy" Peak Thyme and an Italian singer, Vito. Biographer Michael Starr asserts that Sellers showed enthusiasm towards these roles, although the airline campaign failed commercially.

In 1974, Sellers portrayed a "sexually voracious" Queen Victoria in Joseph McGrath's comedic biographical film of the Scottish poet William McGonagall, The Great McGonagall, starring opposite Milligan and Julia Foster. However, the film was a critical failure, and Sellers's career and life reached an all-time low.

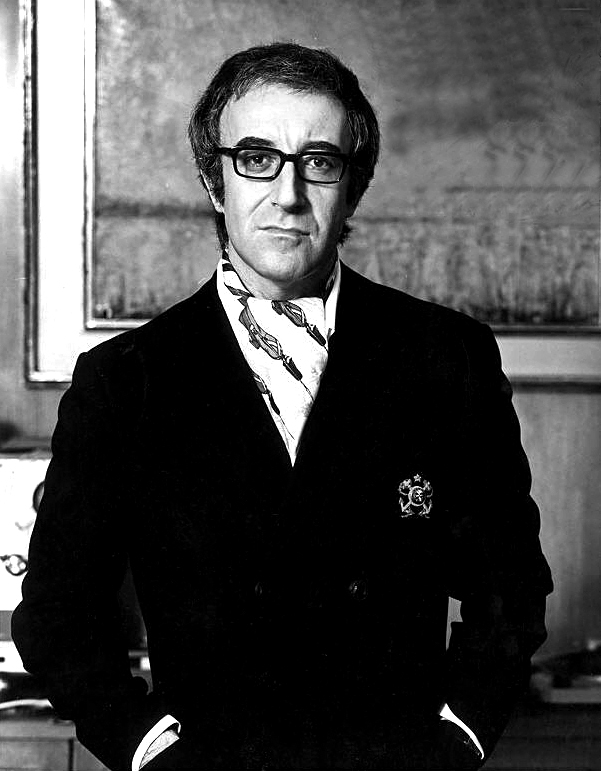
Sellers c. 1975

The turning point in Sellers's flailing career came when he re-teamed with Blake Edwards and starred in The Return of the Pink Panther, alongside Christopher Plummer, Herbert Lom and Catherine Schell. The film was shot on a budget of $3.7 million and earned $33 million at the box office upon release in May 1975, restoring Sellers's career as an A-list film star along with his millionaire status. The film earned Sellers a nomination for the Best Actor – Musical or Comedy award at the 33rd Golden Globe Awards. In 1976, Sellers and Edwards followed it with The Pink Panther Strikes Again. During filming from February to June 1976, the already fraught relationship between Sellers and Blake Edwards had deteriorated even further. Edwards says of the actor's mental state at the time of The Pink Panther Strikes Again, "If you went to an asylum and you described the first inmate you saw, that's what Peter had become. He was certifiable." With declining physical health, Sellers could at times be unbearable on set. His behaviour was regarded as unprofessional and childish, and he frequently threw tantrums, often threatening to abandon projects. His difficult behaviour during productions was widely reported and made it more difficult for Sellers to get employment in the industry at a time when he most needed the work. Despite Sellers's deep personal problems, The Pink Panther Strikes Again was well received critically. Vincent Canby of The New York Times said of Sellers in the film, "There is, too, something most winningly seedy about Mr. Sellers' Clouseau, a fellow who, when he attempts to tear off his clothes in the heat of passion, gets tangled up in his necktie, and who, when he masquerades—for reasons never gone into—as Quasimodo, overinflates his hump with helium." Sellers's performance earned him a further nomination at the 34th Golden Globe Awards.

In March 1976, Sellers began dating actress Lynne Frederick, whom he married on 18 February 1977. Biographer Roger Lewis documents that of Sellers's four wives, Frederick was the most poorly treated; Julian Upton likened it to a boxing match between a heavyweight and a featherweight, a relationship that "oscillated from ardour to hatred, reconciliation and remorse". On 20 March 1977, Sellers suffered a second major heart attack during a flight from Paris to London; he was subsequently fitted with a pacemaker. Sellers returned from his illness to undertake Revenge of the Pink Panther; although it was a commercial success, the critics were tiring of Inspector Clouseau. Julian Upton expressed the view that the strain behind the scenes began to manifest itself in the sluggish pace of the film, describing it as a "laboured, stunt-heavy hotchpotch of half-baked ideas and rehashed gags". Sellers too had become tired of the role, saying after production, "I've honestly had enough of Clouseau—I've got nothing more to give". Steven Bach, the senior vice-president and head of worldwide productions for United Artists, who worked with Sellers on Revenge of the Pink Panther, considered that Sellers was "deeply unbalanced, if not committable: that was the source of his genius and his truly quite terrifying aspects as manipulator and hysteric." He refused to seek professional help for his mental issues. Sellers would claim that he had no personality and was almost unnoticeable, which meant that he "needed a strongly defined character to play". He would make similar references throughout his life: when he appeared on The Muppet Show in 1978, a guest appearance that earned him an Emmy nomination for Outstanding Continuing or Single Performance by a Supporting Actor in Variety or Music, he chose not to appear as himself, instead appearing as a variety of characters in several costumes and speaking in different accents. When Kermit the Frog told Sellers he could relax and just be himself, Sellers replied:

But that, you see, my dear Kermit, would be altogether impossible. I could never be myself ... You see, there is no me. I do not exist ... There used to be a me, but I had it surgically removed.

— Peter Sellers, The Muppet Show, February 1978

=== 1979–1980: Final work, Being There, Fu Manchu, and continued domestic problems ===
In 1979, Sellers starred alongside Lynne Frederick, Lionel Jeffries and Elke Sommer in Richard Quine's The Prisoner of Zenda. He portrayed three roles, including King Rudolf IV and King Rudolf V—rulers of the fictional small nation of Ruritania—and Syd Frewin, Rudolf V's half-brother. Upon its release in May 1979, the film was well received; Janet Maslin of The New York Times observed how Sellers divided "his energies between a serious character and a funny one, but that it was his serious performance which was more impressive". However, Philip French, for The Observer, was unimpressed by the film, describing it as "a mess of porridge" (sic) and stating that "Sellers reveals that he cannot draw the line between the sincere and the sentimental".

Later in 1979, Sellers starred opposite Shirley MacLaine, Melvyn Douglas and Jack Warden in the satirical film Being There as Chance, a simple-minded, secluded live-in gardener addicted to watching TV who is regarded as a sage by the rich and powerful after being forced into the outside world. In a BBC interview in 1971, Sellers had said that more than anything else, he wanted to play the role and persuaded the author of the book, Jerzy Kosiński, to allow him and director Hal Ashby to make the film, provided Kosiński could write the script. During filming, to remain in character, Sellers refused most interview requests and kept his distance from the other actors. Sellers considered Chance's walking and voice the character's most important attributes, and in preparing for the role, he worked alone with a tape recorder or with his wife, and then with Ashby, to perfect the clear enunciation and flat delivery needed to reveal "the childlike mind behind the words". Sellers described his experience of working on the film as "so humbling, so powerful", and co-star Shirley MacLaine found Sellers "a dream" to work with. Sellers's performance was universally lauded by critics and is considered by critic Danny Smith to be the "crowning triumph of Peter Sellers' remarkable career". Critic Frank Rich wrote that the acting skill required for this sort of role, with a "schismatic personality which Peter had to convey with strenuous vocal and gestural technique ... A lesser actor would have made the character's mental dysfunction flamboyant and drastic ... [His] intelligence was always deeper, his onscreen confidence greater, his technique much more finely honed": in achieving this, Sellers "makes the film's fantastic premise credible". The film earned Sellers a Best Actor award at the 51st National Board of Review Awards; the London Critics Circle Film Awards Special Achievement Award; the Best Actor award at the 45th New York Film Critics Circle Awards; and the Best Actor – Musical or Comedy award at the 37th Golden Globe Awards. Additionally, Sellers was nominated for the Best Actor award at the 52nd Academy Awards and the Best Actor in a Leading Role award at the 34th British Academy Film Awards.

In March 1980, Sellers asked his 15-year-old daughter Victoria what she thought about Being There; she reported later that "I said yes, I thought it was great. But then I said, 'You looked like a little fat old man'. ... he went mad. He threw his drink over me and told me to get the next plane home." His other daughter Sarah told Sellers her thoughts about the incident, and he sent her a telegram that read, "After what happened this morning with Victoria, I shall be happy if I never hear from you again. I won't tell you what I think of you. It must be obvious. Goodbye, Your Father."

Sellers's last film was The Fiendish Plot of Dr. Fu Manchu, a comedic re-imagining of the eponymous adventure novels by Sax Rohmer; Sellers played both police inspector Nayland Smith and Fu Manchu, alongside Helen Mirren and David Tomlinson. The production of the film was troublesome before filming started, with two directors—Richard Quine and John Avildsen—fired before the script had been completed. Sellers also expressed dissatisfaction with his own portrayal of Manchu, with his ill health often causing delays. Arguments between Sellers and director Piers Haggard led to Haggard's firing at Sellers's instigation, and Sellers took over direction, using his long-time friend David Lodge to direct some sequences. Tom Shales of The Washington Post described the film as "an indefensibly inept comedy", adding that "it is hard to name another good actor who ever made so many bad movies as Sellers, a comedian of great gifts but ferociously faulty judgment. "Manchu" will take its rightful place alongside such colossally ill-advised washouts as Tell Me Where It Hurts, The Bobo and The Prisoner of Zenda".

Sellers's final performances were a series of advertisements for Barclays Bank. Filmed in April 1980 in Ireland, he played Monty Casino, a Jewish con man. (Note: According to biographer Peter Evans, Sellers received criticism for his portrayal of characters interpreted to be Jewish right from The Goon Show days, and the show received complaints accusing them of anti-Semitism. The Monty Casino character was similarly criticised, and Barclays made the decision to immediately cancel the commercial, although, according to them, it was as a mark of respect upon his death.) Four advertisements were scheduled, but only three were filmed as Sellers collapsed in Dublin, again with heart problems. After two days in care—and against the advice of his doctors—he travelled to the Cannes Film Festival, where Being There was in competition. Sellers was again ill in Cannes, returning to his residence in Gstaad to work on the script for his next project, Romance of the Pink Panther. At the urging of his friends, he made an appointment to undergo an angiogram at the Cedars-Sinai Medical Center in Los Angeles on 30 July 1980 to see if he was able to undergo open-heart surgery. Spike Milligan later considered that Sellers's heart condition had lasted for over 15 years and had "made life difficult for him and had a debilitating effect on his personality." Sellers's fourth marriage to Frederick collapsed soon after. Sellers had recently started to rebuild his relationship with his son Michael after the failure of the latter's marriage. In lighter moments, Sellers had joked that his epitaph should read "Star of stage, screen and alimony."

== Death ==
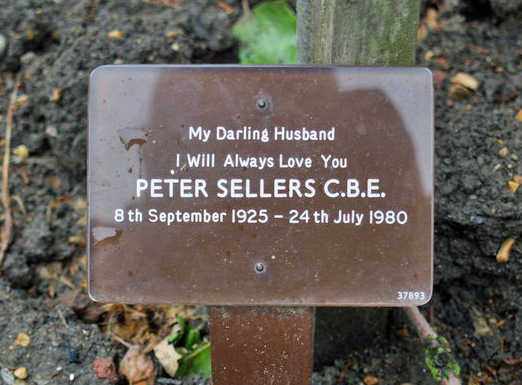
Plaque commemorating Sellers at Golders Green Crematorium

On 21 July 1980, Sellers arrived in London from Geneva. He checked into the Dorchester hotel before visiting Golders Green Crematorium for the first time to see the location of his parents' ashes. He had plans to attend a reunion dinner with his Goon Show partners Milligan and Secombe, scheduled for the evening of 22 July. On the day of the dinner, Sellers took lunch in his hotel suite and shortly afterward collapsed from a heart attack. He was taken to the Middlesex Hospital, London, and died just after midnight on 24 July 1980, aged 54.

Following Sellers's death, fellow actor Richard Attenborough said that Sellers "had the genius comparable to Chaplin", while the Boulting brothers considered Sellers as "a man of enormous gifts; and these gifts he gave to the world. For them, he is assured of a place in the history of art as entertainment." Burt Kwouk, who appeared as Cato in the Pink Panther films, stated that "Peter was a well-loved actor in Britain ... the day he died, it seemed that the whole country came to a stop. Everywhere you went, the fact that Peter had died seemed like an umbrella over everything". Director Blake Edwards thought that "Peter was brilliant. He had an enormous facility for finding really unusual, unique facets of the character he was playing". Sellers's friend and Goon Show colleague Spike Milligan was too upset to speak to the press at the time of Sellers's death, while fellow Goon Harry Secombe said, "I'm shattered. Peter was such a tremendous artist. He had so much talent, it just oozed out of him". In dark humour, referring to the missed dinner the Goons had planned, he added, "Anything to avoid paying for dinner". In a reference to one of The Goon Show's recurring catchphrases, Secombe later declared to journalists, "Bluebottle is deaded now". Milligan later said that "it's hard to say this, but he died at the right time."

A private funeral service was held at Golders Green Crematorium on 26 July, conducted by Sellers's old friend, Canon John Hester. Sellers's final joke was the playing of "In the Mood" by Glenn Miller, a tune which all the Goons hated; he knew they would have to sit there in silence and listen to it. A memorial service was held at St Martin-in-the-Fields on 8 September 1980—what would have been Sellers's 55th birthday. Close friend Lord Snowdon read the twenty-third Psalm, Harry Secombe sang "Bread of Heaven", and the eulogy was read by David Niven.

=== Subsequent family issues ===
Although Sellers was reportedly in the process of excluding Frederick from his will a week before he died, she inherited almost his entire estate, worth an estimated £4.5 million (£19.3 million in 2025 pounds), while his children received £800 each (£3,000 in 2025). Spike Milligan appealed to her on behalf of Sellers's three children, but she refused to increase the amount. (Note: Frederick subsequently married David Frost; she divorced him and married a cardiologist, Dr Barry Unger. She died in 1994 after struggling with drug and alcohol dependency.) Sellers's only son, Michael, died of a heart attack at 52 during surgery on 24 July 2006, 26 years to the day after his father's death.

After Peter Sellers's death, Metro-Goldwyn-Mayer tried to continue with Romance of the Pink Panther and offered the role of Clouseau to Dudley Moore, who turned it down. The studio subsequently returned to Blake Edwards, who was adamant to not recast the character, feeling certain that no one could adequately replace Sellers. In 1982, Edwards released Trail of the Pink Panther, which was composed entirely of deleted scenes from his past three Panther films. Frederick sued, claiming the use of the clips was a breach of contract; the court awarded her $1 million ($3.3 million in 2025), plus 3.15 per cent of the film's profits and 1.36 per cent of its gross revenue.

== Technique ==
I start with the voice. I find out how the character sounds. It's through the way he speaks that I find out the rest about him. ... After the voice comes the looks of the man. I do a lot of drawings of the character I play. Then I get together with the makeup man and we sort of transfer my drawings onto my face. An involved process. After that I establish how the character walks. Very important, the walk. And then, suddenly, something strange happens. The person takes over. The man you play begins to exist.

— Sellers describing how he prepared for his wide range of roles in an October 1962 interview for Playboy.

Vincent Canby of The New York Times said of the Pink Panther films, "I'm not sure why Mr. Sellers and Mr. Lom are such a hilarious team, though it may be because each is a fine comic actor with a special talent for portraying the sort of all-consuming, epic self-absorption that makes slapstick farce initially acceptable—instead of alarming—and finally so funny." The film critic Elvis Mitchell said that Sellers was one of the few comic geniuses who was able to truly hide behind his characters, giving the audience no sense of what he was really like in real life. A feature of the characterisations undertaken by Sellers is that, regardless of how clumsy or idiotic they are, he ensured that they always retained their dignity. On his playing of Clouseau, Sellers said, "I set out to play Clouseau with great dignity because I feel that he thinks he is probably one of the greatest detectives in the world. The original script makes him out to be a complete idiot. I thought a forgivable vanity would humanise him and make him kind of touching."

Sellers's biographer, Ed Sikov, notes that because of this retained dignity, Sellers is "the master of playing men who have no idea how ridiculous they are." Social historian Sam Wasson notes the complexity in Sellers's performances in the Pink Panther films, which has the effect of alienating Clouseau from his environment. Wasson considers that "As 'low' and 'high' comedy rolled into one, it's the performative counterpoint to Edwardian sophisticated naturalism". This combination of "high" and "low", exemplified by Clouseau's attempting to retain dignity after a fall, means that within the film Clouseau was "the sole representative of humanity". Film critic Dilys Powell also saw the inherent dignity in the parts and wrote that Sellers had a "balance between character and absurdity". Richard Attenborough also thought that because of his sympathy, Sellers could "inject into his characterisations the frailty and substance of a human being".

Peter was a marvelous improvisational actor, brilliant if you got him on the first take. The second take would be good, but after the third take he could be really awful. If he had to repeat the same words too many times they became meaningless. But it was such a joy to work with Peter because he was such an inspired actor. Sometimes he would literally knock me off my feet. I'd fall down convulsed with laughter.

— Filmmaker Jack Arnold, on directing Sellers in The Mouse That Roared.

Author Aaron Sultanik observed that in Sellers's early films, such as I'm All Right Jack, he displays "deft, technical interpretations [that] pinpoint the mechanical nature of his comic characterization", which "reduces each of his characters to a series of gross, awkward tics". Academic Cynthia Baron observed that Sellers's external characterisations led to doubt with reviewers as to whether Sellers's work was "true" acting. (Note: Baron goes on to note that much of the "true acting" question was due to the "polemical publicity" of Lee Strasberg and that British characterisation led to artificial performances in contrast to method acting.) Critic Tom Milne saw a change over Sellers's career and thought that his "comic genius as a character actor was ... stifled by his elevation to leading man" and his later films suffered as a result. Sultanik agreed, commenting that Sellers's "exceptional vocal and physical technique" was underused during his career in the US.

Academics Maria Pramaggiore and Tom Wallis remarked that Sellers fits the mould of a technical actor because he displays a mastery of physical characterisation, such as accent or physical trait. Writer and playwright John Mortimer saw the process for himself when Sellers was about to undertake filming on Mortimer's The Dock Brief and could not decide how to play the character of the barrister. By chance, he ordered cockles for lunch, and the smell brought back a memory of the seaside town of Morecambe; this gave him "the idea of a faded North Country accent and the suggestion of a scrappy moustache". So important was the voice as the starting point for character development that Sellers would walk around London with a reel-to-reel tape recorder, recording voices to study at home.

== Legacy ==
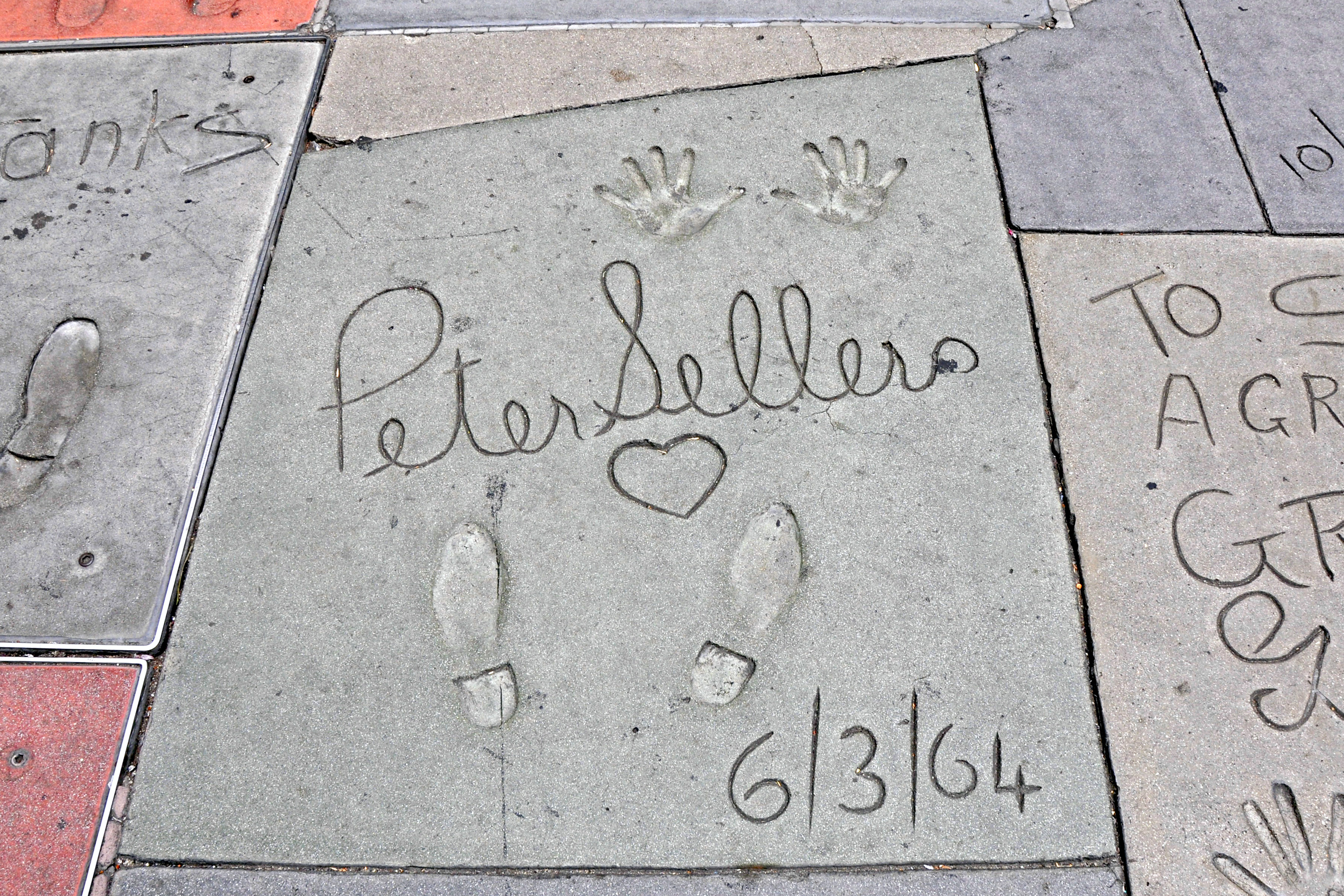
Sellers's hands and footprints at Grauman's Chinese Theatre

New York magazine stated that all of the films starring Sellers as Clouseau showcased his "comedic brilliance". Sellers's friend and Goon Show colleague Spike Milligan said that Sellers "had one of the most glittering comic talents of his age", while English filmmakers John and Roy Boulting stated that he was "the greatest comic genius this country has produced since Charles Chaplin". Irv Slifkin said that the most prominent, albeit ever-changing, face in comedies of the 1960s was Sellers, who "changed like a chameleon throughout the era, dazzling audiences". In a 2005 poll to find "The Comedian's Comedian", Sellers was voted 14th in the list of the top 20 greatest comedians by fellow comics and comedy insiders.

Sellers and The Goon Show were a strong influence on the Monty Python performers, with John Cleese calling him "the greatest voice man of all time", adding, "If he could listen to you for five minutes, he could do a perfect impersonation of you." The Goons were imported to the United States by the NBC program Monitor, which played recorded Goon Show episodes starting in 1955. The American comedy troupe the Firesign Theatre also cited the Goons as a big influence on their radio comedy style.

Sellers and the Goons were also an influence on Peter Cook, who described Sellers as "the best comic actor in the world". British actor Stephen Mangan stated that Sellers was a large influence, as did the comedians Mike Myers, Alan Carr and Rob Brydon. Sellers's characters Hrundi Bakshi (The Party) and Inspector Clouseau (The Pink Panther) later influenced comedian Rowan Atkinson's characters Mr. Bean and Johnny English. The comic performer Sacha Baron Cohen referred to Sellers as "the most seminal force in shaping [his] early ideas on comedy". Cohen was considered for the role of Sellers in the biographical film The Life and Death of Peter Sellers. Will Ferrell considers Sellers to be an important influence on him, citing his "unique combination of being extremely subtle and over-the-top all at the same time." The three members of Spinal Tap—Michael McKean, Christopher Guest and Harry Shearer—have also cited Sellers as being an influence on them, as has the US talk-show host Conan O'Brien. David Schwimmer is another whose approach was influenced by Sellers: "he could do anything, from Dr Strangelove to Inspector Clouseau. He was just amazing."

As a child, Eddie Murphy developed his skills in playing multiple characters in imitation of Sellers, whom he called his acting hero, with Chris Rock hailing Murphy's performances (such as the multiple roles in The Nutty Professor) as "Peter Sellers–esque". During an interview in 2002, Robin Williams told Michael Parkinson that Sellers was an important influence, especially his multi-character roles in Dr. Strangelove, stating, "It doesn't get better than that." Williams was considered to play Sellers in the HBO biopic but turned it down over scheduling conflicts, though Williams considered it an honour to be able to portray him. Eddie Izzard notes that the Goons "influenced a new generation of comedians who came to be known as 'alternative'"—including herself, while the media historian Graham McCann states "the anarchic spirit of the Goon Show ... would inspire, directly or indirectly and to varying extents, ... The Hitchhiker's Guide to the Galaxy, The Young Ones, Vic Reeves Big Night Out, The League of Gentlemen [and] Brass Eye."

The stage play Being Sellers premiered in Australia in 1998, three years after the release of the biography by Roger Lewis, The Life and Death of Peter Sellers. In 2004, the book was turned into an HBO film with the same title, starring Geoffrey Rush. The play later transferred to New York in December 2010. The Belfast Telegraph notes how the film captured Sellers's "life of drugs, drink, fast cars and lots and lots of beautiful women".

== Filmography and other works ==
Selected works, based on award nominations

Film	Year	Role	Award
The Running Jumping & Standing Still Film	1959	(Note: Sellers appeared in the film but was nominated in his capacity as the producer. It was Sellers's only producing credit.)	Nominated – Academy Award for Short Subject (Live Action)
I'm All Right Jack	1959	Fred Kite	Won – British Academy Film Award for Best British Actor
Waltz of the Toreadors	1962	General Leo Fitzjohn	Won – San Sebastián International Film Festival for Best Actor
Lolita	1962	Clare Quilty	Nominated – Golden Globe Award for Best Supporting Actor
Only Two Can Play	1962	John Lewis	Nominated – British Academy Film Award for Best British Actor
The Pink Panther	1963	Inspector Jacques Clouseau	Nominated – Golden Globe Award for Best Actor – Musical or Comedy; Nominated – British Academy Film Award for Best British Actor
A Shot in the Dark	1964	Inspector Jacques Clouseau	Nominated – British Academy Film Award for Best British Costume (Color)
Dr. Strangelove	1964	Group Captain Lionel Mandrake/ President Merkin Muffley/ Dr. Strangelove	Nominated – Academy Award for Best Actor; Nominated – British Academy Film Award for Best British Actor
The Optimists of Nine Elms	1973	Sam	Won – Tehran Film Festival Award for Best Actor
The Return of the Pink Panther	1975	Inspector Jacques Clouseau	Won – The Evening News British Film Award for Best Actor; Nominated – Golden Globe Award for Best Actor – Musical or Comedy
The Pink Panther Strikes Again	1976	Inspector Jacques Clouseau	Nominated – Golden Globe Award for Best Actor – Musical or Comedy
Being There	1979	Chance	Won – National Board of Review Award for Best Actor; Won – New York Film Critics Circle Award for Best Actor; Won – Golden Globe Award for Best Actor – Musical or Comedy; Won – London Film Critics' Circle Award for Best Actor; Nominated – British Academy Film Award for Best Actor in a Leading Role; Nominated – Academy Award for Best Actor

== See also ==
- List of Academy Award winners and nominees from Great Britain
- List of actors with Academy Award nominations
- List of British actors

== Notes and references ==
=== Sources ===
- Anthony, Barry (2010). The King's Jester. London: I.B. Tauris. ISBN 978-1-84885-430-7.
- Baron, Cynthia (2012). "Peter Sellers: A figure of the Impasse". In Robertson Wojcik, Pamela (ed.). New Constellations: Movie Stars of the 1960s. Piscataway, New Jersey: Rutgers University Press. ISBN 978-0-8135-5229-3.
- Benson, Raymond (1988). The James Bond Bedside Companion. London: Boxtree Ltd. ISBN 978-1-85283-233-9.
- Burton, Alan; O'Sullivan, Tim (2009). The Cinema of Basil Dearden and Michael Relph. Edinburgh: Edinburgh University Press. ISBN 978-0-7486-3289-3.
- Carpenter, Humphrey (2003). Spike Milligan: The Biography. London: Coronet Books. ISBN 978-0-340-82612-6.
- Culhane, John (1986). Special Effects in the Movies: How They Do It. New York: Ballantine Books. ISBN 978-0-345-34536-3.
- Dawson, Nick (2009). Being Hal Ashby: Life of a Hollywood Rebel. Lexington, Kentucky: University Press of Kentucky. ISBN 978-0-8131-2538-1.
- Dixon, Wheeler Winston (2007). Film Talk: Directors at Work. Piscataway, New Jersey: Rutgers University Press. ISBN 978-0-8135-4147-1.
- Duncan, Paul (2003). Stanley Kubrick: The Complete Films. Taschen GmbH. p. 95. ISBN 978-3-8365-2775-0.
- Evans, Peter (1980). The Mask Behind the Mask. London: Severn House Publishers. ISBN 0-7278-0688-2.
- Games, Alexander (2003). The Essential Spike Milligan. London: Fourth Estate. ISBN 978-0-00-715511-8.
- Ginibre, Jean-Louis; Lithgow, John; Cady, Barbara (2005). Ladies Or Gentlemen: A Pictorial History of Male Cross-Dressing in the Movies. New York: Filipacchi Publishing. ISBN 978-1-933231-04-4.
- Grierson, John (1966). Grierson on Documentary. Berkeley, California: University of California Press. OCLC 592409828.
- Hall, Julian (2006). The Rough Guide to British Cult Comedy. London: Rough Guides. ISBN 978-1-84353-618-5.
- Johnson, Tom; Vecchio, Deborah Del (1996). Hammer Films: An Exhaustive Filmography. Jefferson, North Carolina: McFarland & Company. ISBN 978-0-7864-0034-8.
- Lewis, Roger (1995). The Life and Death of Peter Sellers. London: Arrow Books. ISBN 978-0-09-974700-0.
- LoBrutto, Vincent (1999). Stanley Kubrick: A Biography. Cambridge, Massachusetts: Da Capo Press. ISBN 978-0-306-80906-4.
- McCann, Graham (2006). Spike & Co. London: Hodder & Stoughton. ISBN 978-0-340-89809-3.
- Miles, Barry (2009). The British invasion. New York: Sterling Publishing. ISBN 978-1-4027-6976-4.
- Moritz, Charles (1961). Current Biography Yearbook, Volume 21. New York: H. W. Wilson Company.
- Parkinson, Michael (2009). Parky: My Autobiography. London: Hodder & Stoughton. ISBN 978-0-340-96167-4.
- Perry, George (2007). The Life of Python. London: Pavilion Books. ISBN 978-1-86205-762-3.
- Pramaggiore, Maria; Wallis, Tom (2005). Film: A Critical Introduction. London: Laurence King Publishing. ISBN 978-1-85669-442-1.
- Rankin, Nicholas (2009). A Genius for Deception: How Cunning Helped the British Win Two World Wars. Oxford: Oxford University Press. p. 383. ISBN 978-0-19-538704-9.
- Reemes, Dana M. 1988. Directed by Jack Arnold. McFarland & Company, Jefferson, North Carolina 1988. ISBN 978-0899503318
- Rigelsford, Adrian (2004). Peter Sellers: A Life in Character. London: Virgin Books. ISBN 978-0-7535-0270-9.
- Saunders, Robert A. (2009). The Many Faces of Sacha Baron Cohen: Politics, Parody, and the Battle Over Borat. Lanham, Maryland: Rowman & Littlefield. ISBN 978-0-7391-2337-9.
- Segrave, Kerry (2005). Endorsements in advertising: a social history. Jefferson, North Carolina: McFarland & Company. ISBN 978-0-7864-2043-8.
- Sellers, Michael (1981). P.S. I Love You!. Glasgow: William Collins, Sons. ISBN 0-00-216649-6.
- Sellers, Michael; Morecambe, Gary (2000). Sellers on Sellers. London: André Deutsch. ISBN 978-0-233-99883-1.
- Sikov, Ed (2002). Mr Strangelove; A Biography of Peter Sellers. London: Sidgwick & Jackson. ISBN 978-0-283-07297-0.
- Slifkin, Irv (2004). VideoHound's Groovy Movies: Far-Out Films of the Psychedelic Era. Detroit, Michigan: Visible Ink Press. ISBN 978-1-57859-155-8.
- Spicer, Andrew (2003). Typical Men: The Representation of Masculinity in Popular British Cinema. London: I.B. Tauris. ISBN 978-1-86064-931-8.
- Starr, Michael (1991). Peter Sellers: A Film History. Jefferson, North Carolina: McFarland & Company. ISBN 978-0-89950-512-1.
- Sultanik, Aaron (1986). Film, a Modern Art. Cranbury, New Jersey: Associated University Presses. ISBN 978-0-8453-4752-2.
- Terry-Thomas; Daum, Terry (1990). Terry-Thomas Tells Tales. London: Robson Books. ISBN 978-0-86051-662-0.
- TV Guide film & video companion. New York: Barnes & Noble. 2004. ISBN 978-0-7607-6104-5.
- Walker, Alexander (1981). Peter Sellers. Littlehampton: Littlehampton Book Services. ISBN 978-0-297-77965-0.
- Upton, Julian (2004). Fallen Stars: Tragic Lives and Lost Careers. Manchester: Headpress/Critical Vision. ISBN 978-1-900486-38-5.
- Wasson, Sam (2009). A Splurch in the Kisser: The Movies of Blake Edwards. Middletown, Connecticut: Wesleyan University Press. ISBN 978-0-8195-6915-8.
- Who Was Who (1971–1980). London: A & C Black. 1981. ISBN 978-0-7136-2176-1.
- Wilmut, Roger; Grafton, Jimmy (1981). The Goon Show Companion – A History and Goonography. London: Robson Books. ISBN 0-903895-64-1.
