= William J. Weatherby =

British-American author and journalist (1930–1992)

William J. Weatherby (1930–1992) was a British–American author and journalist who was actively involved in the U.S. Civil Rights movement. His writings spanned multiple genres, including mystery, romance, historical fiction, biography, and social history.

== Life and career ==
Born in a suburb of Manchester, England in 1930, Weatherby began his journalism career in 1952 with The Manchester Guardian. Over the decades, he contributed articles to American publications such as Newsweek, The Washington Post, and The New York Times, and to the British social and cultural comment magazine New Society.

He first travelled to the U.S. in the early 1960s as an entertainment correspondent and feature writer for The Guardian. He was then assigned to report on the ongoing Civil Rights movement. In the course of doing so, he became romantically involved with an African-American man named Christine, and they travelled together throughout Louisiana, Georgia, and New York. Weatherby's experiences covering the movement, and his relationship with Christine, inspired his 1966 book, Love in the Shadows. When fictionalizing the relationship, Weatherby wrote Christine as a woman for the story to be published.

While in the U.S., Weatherby developed close friendships with Civil Rights leaders James Baldwin and Bayard Rustin, and would later write a biography of Baldwin. In 1967, Weatherby and Roi Ottley co-edited The Negro in New York: An Informal Social History (1967), a research project originally conducted under the Depression-era Works Progress Administration.

In addition to his Civil Rights journalism in the late 1960s, Weatherby served as the American editor for Penguin Books. In the 1970s, he became a senior editor at Farrar, Straus & Giroux. In 1976, he published Conversations with Marilyn, an account of his discussions and experiences with Marilyn Monroe during the filming of what would be her final completed movie, The Misfits (1961); Weatherby had briefly been a confidante of Monroe's while working for The Guardian as an entertainment correspondent. He published a number of other books on prominent people, including Norman Mailer, Salman Rushdie, and Jackie Gleason.

Weatherby continued writing novels until the end of his life. Among his works are One of Our Priests is Missing (1968) and the mystery stories Murder at the UN (1977) and Death of an Informer (1977). In 1982, he novelized Colin Welland's Academy Award-winning screenplay for Chariots of Fire into a mass market paperback.

In August 1992, Weatherby died of cancer at Saint Francis Hospital in Poughkeepsie, New York. He was 62 years old.

== Bibliography ==
=== Novels ===
- Love in the Shadows (1966)
- Out of Hiding (1966)
- One of Our Priests is Missing (1968)
- Murder at the UN (1977)
- Death of an Informer (1977)
- Goliath (1981)
- Chariots of Fire (1982)
- Coronation (1990)

=== Non-fiction ===
- Breaking the Silence: The Negro Struggle in the U.S.A. (1965)
- The Negro in New York: An Informal Social History (1967; co-edited with Roi Ottley)
- Conversations with Marilyn (1976)
- Squaring off: Mailer vs Baldwin (1977)
- James Baldwin, Artist on Fire (1989)
- Salman Rushdie, Sentenced to Death (1990)
- Jackie Gleason (1992)
