= Ed Sikov =

American film scholar and author (born 1957)

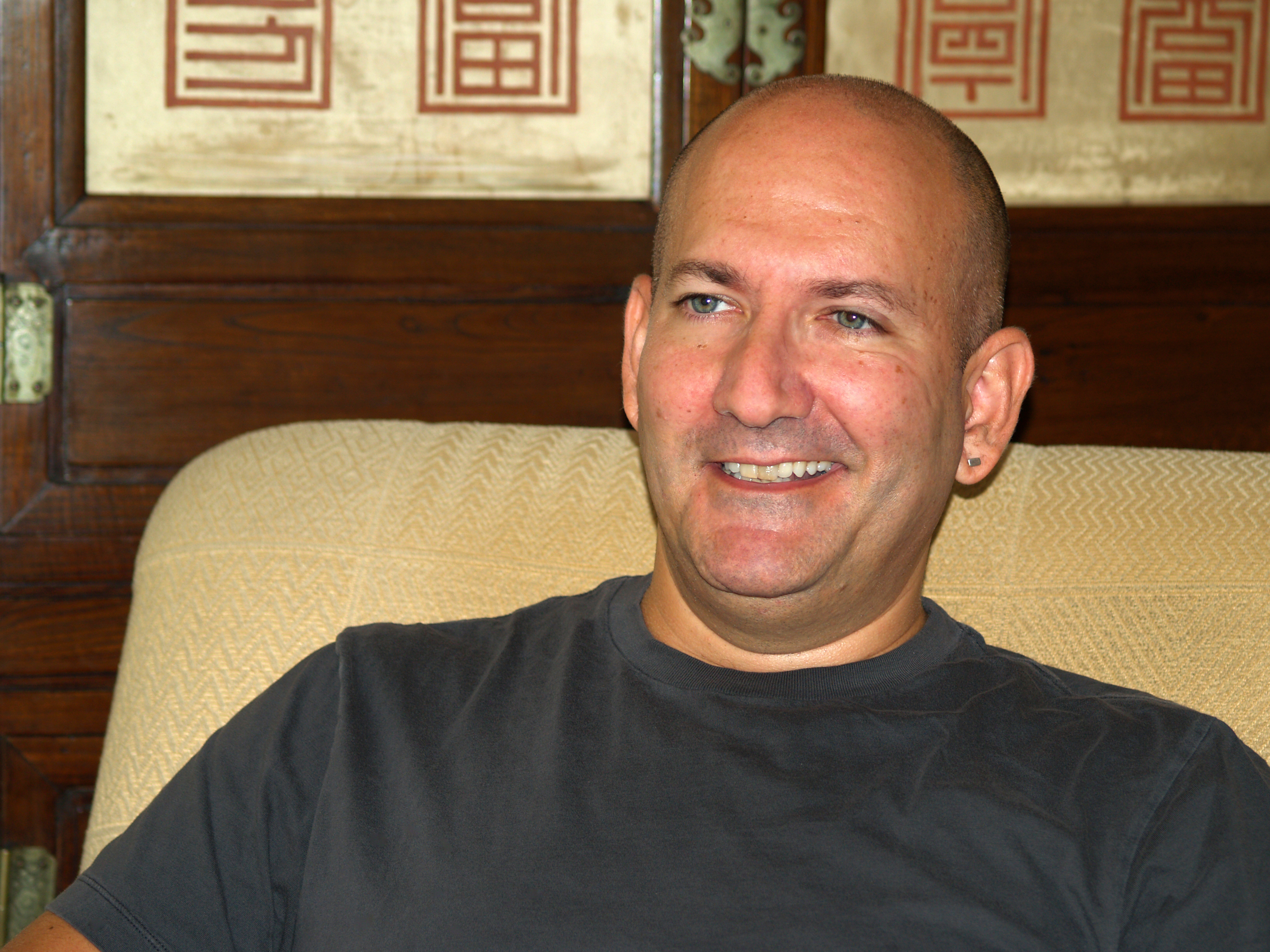
- Born: 1957 (age 67–68); Natrona Heights, Pennsylvania, U.S.
- Occupation: Film scholar; author
- Education: Haverford College; Columbia University (PhD)
- Spouse: Bruce Schackman

Ed Sikov (born 1957, Pennsylvania) is an American film scholar and author. His books include Mr. Strangelove: A Biography of Peter Sellers (published in 2002), On Sunset Boulevard: The Life and Times of Billy Wilder (published in 1998), and Laughing Hysterically: American Screen Comedies of the 1950s (published in 1994).

== Early life ==
Sikov was born in Natrona Heights, Pennsylvania, majored in English at Haverford College, and has a PhD from Columbia University; Sikov has since written eloquently of the difficulties he experienced as a gay student in the 1970s. He has lived in New York City since 1979, and currently resides with his husband, Bruce Schackman.

== Publishings ==
Sikov's most recent book is a textbook – Film Studies: An Introduction; before that was Dark Victory: The Life of Bette Davis (Henry Holt, 2007). He recorded a commentary track for the Special Collector's Edition DVD of Billy Wilder's Sunset Boulevard, and is often called upon as a film expert for articles and documentaries, such as the 10-part American Cinema series produced by the New York Center for Visual History in association with the BBC and PBS. He has also written for the British and US editions of Premiere magazine as well as for Out, The Advocate, Connoisseur, Spy, Village Voice and Film Quarterly.

Critical reception to Sikov's books has been appreciative: film historian Jeanine Basinger finds him "a caring biographer" who is exhaustive in his research; his writing has been noted for its unsentimental tone and detailed scholarship. While taking issue with his style, film critic Rex Reed has acknowledged Sikov's accuracy and refusal to "whitewash" facts.

Sikov has taught film studies at several colleges and universities, including Colorado College and his alma maters Columbia University and Haverford College. A course he taught at Haverford between 1995 and 2005, Sex and Gender on Film, earned notice as "one of the most popular courses" at that institution.

Sikov's contributions as an author and teacher have been curtailed by the onset of Parkinson's disease. He stopped writing the Media Circus column in the New York-based Gay City News in early 2020.

== Works ==
- Film Studies: An Introduction
- Dark Victory: The Life of Bette Davis
- On Sunset Boulevard: The Life and Times of Billy Wilder
- Mr Strangelove: A Biography of Peter Sellers
- Screwball: Hollywood's Madcap Romantic Comedies
- Laughing Hysterically: American Screen Comedy of the 1950s
- American Cinema Study Guide
- (included in) Boys Like Us, anthology
- (included in) Friends and Lovers, anthology
