= Tony Greaves, Baron Greaves =

British politician (1942–2021)

The Right Honourable The Lord Greaves
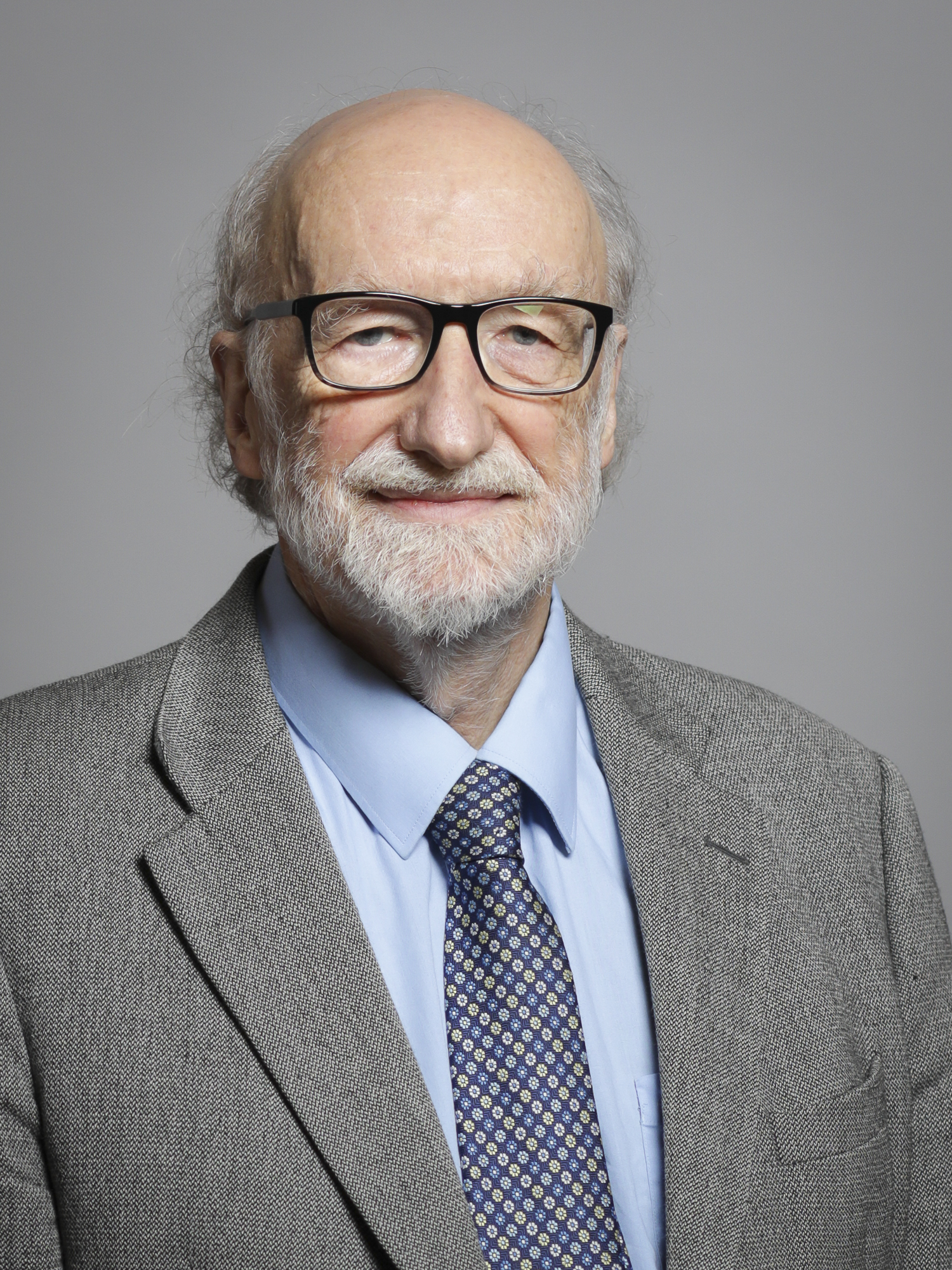
- Official portrait, 2019

Member of the House of Lords
- Lord Temporal
- Life peerage 4 May 2000 – 23 March 2021

Personal details
- Born: Anthony Robert Greaves; 27 July 1942 Bradford, West Riding of Yorkshire, England
- Died: 23 March 2021 (aged 78) Trawden, Lancashire, England
- Party: Liberal Democrats (after 1988); Liberal (before 1988)
- Education: Hertford College, Oxford (BA)

Anthony Robert Greaves, Baron Greaves (27 July 1942 – 23 March 2021) was a British politician and life peer. He was a Liberal Democrat member of the House of Lords.

== Education and early career ==
Greaves was born on 27 July 1942 in Bradford, Yorkshire. His father, Geoffrey Greaves, was a police driving instructor and his mother was Moyra Greaves (née Brookes). He was educated at Queen Elizabeth Grammar School, Wakefield before attending Hertford College, Oxford, where he obtained a BA in Geography. After moving to the north-west he became a member of Lancashire County Council for 25 years, and also a local councillor on Colne Borough Council and subsequently on Pendle Borough Council, on which he served until his death.

=== Community Politics ===
Greaves was the mover—rather than author—of a motion at the Liberal Assembly in 1970 which committed the Liberal Party to pursuing community politics. He stood as the Liberal Democrat candidate for the Pendle constituency in the 1997 General Election, finishing third with 11.6% of the vote.

== House of Lords ==
Greaves was made a life peer on 4 May 2000 as Baron Greaves, of Pendle in the County of Lancashire. He was an advocate of social liberalism, and went on record opposing some of the reforms to his party brought about by Sir Menzies Campbell and Nick Clegg.

In 2010 Greaves went on record to express his personal frustration at the auction of a manorial title, the Lordship of Pendle, suspiciously close to his own. Greaves' concerns were later shown to be legitimate when it transpired that the Lordship of the Forest of Pendle belongs to the Barons Clitheroe and forms part of the Honour of Clitheroe holdings they have held since the Second World War. Its sale was invalid and had not been authorised by its owners.

=== Criticism of sexual harassment claimants ===
In 2013 Lord Greaves attracted criticism for offering comment that appeared to make light of accusations, by four Liberal Democrat members, of sexual harassment by another Liberal Democrat peer, Lord Rennard. Greaves wrote on a Liberal Democrat party message board: "We don’t know the details of anything that may have happened. But it is hardly an offence for one adult person to make fairly mild sexual advances to another. What matters is whether they are . . . rebuffed. In passing, I would note and guess that if the allegations as made are a matter for resignation, perhaps around a half of the male members of the Lords over the age of 50 would probably not be seen again."

In 2015 he described complainants—who had all by then resigned from the Liberal Democrats—of having 'a deliberate vendetta' against Rennard, writing "I certainly accuse some of the women of not telling the truth and of a deliberate vendetta where the facts became lost in the fog of vitriol."

== Death ==
Greaves died at his home in Winewall, Trawden, Lancashire, on 23 March 2021, aged 78. His death was sudden: he had made his last speech in the Lords less than a week earlier. His funeral took place on 9 April 2021.
