= Lynne Frederick =

British actress (1954–1994)

- Frederick in 1982
- Born: 25 July 1954; Hillingdon, Middlesex, England
- Died: 27 April 1994 (aged 39); Los Angeles, California, U.S.
- Resting place: Golders Green Crematorium
- Other name: Lynne Sellers (legal married name)
- Occupations: Actress; model
- Years active: 1969–1979
- Known for: The Amazing Mr. Blunden; Henry VIII and His Six Wives; Voyage of the Damned; Vampire Circus; Phase IV; Nicholas and Alexandra; A Long Return
- Spouses: Peter Sellers (m. 1977; died 1980); David Frost (m. 1981; div. 1982); Barry Unger (m. 1982; div. 1991)
- Partner: Julian Posner (1972–1975)
- Children: 1
- Awards: Evening Standard British Film Award for Best Newcomer – Actress

Lynne Frederick (25 July 1954 – 27 April 1994) was an English actress and model. In a career spanning ten years, she made over thirty appearances in film and television productions. She often played the girl next door and performed in a range of genres, from contemporary science fiction to slasher horror, romantic dramas, classic westerns, and occasional comedies, although her greater successes were in period films and costume dramas.

In 1980, after the death of her husband, Peter Sellers, she came to national attention over the nature of his controversial will, in which she was listed as the primary beneficiary. She was publicly criticised, ridiculed and perceived as a gold digger by the press and public. Her career and reputation never recovered from the backlash and she was subsequently blacklisted by Hollywood. She lived out the remainder of her years in California, and kept a low profile until her unexpected death in 1994.

In the decades since her death, Frederick has steadily attracted a posthumous cult following for her collection of work in motion pictures and television. Some of her better-known performances include her roles in films such as Nicholas and Alexandra (1971), The Amazing Mr. Blunden, Henry VIII and His Six Wives (both 1972), and Voyage of the Damned (1976). Other films of hers such as Vampire Circus (1971), Phase IV (1974), Four of the Apocalypse (1975), A Long Return (Largo retorno) (1975), and Schizo (1976) have all become underground hits or established a status as a cult film in their genres, contributing to the renewed interest in her life and career.

She was the first recipient of the award for Best Newcomer (Actress) from the Evening Standard British Film Awards in 1973, for her performances in Henry VIII and His Six Wives (1972) and The Amazing Mr. Blunden (1972). She is one of only eight actresses, and the youngest, to hold this title.

== Early life ==
Frederick was born in Hillingdon, Middlesex, to Andrew Frederick and Iris C. Frederick (née Sullivan). While she was very young, her father abandoned the family, and she was brought up by her mother and maternal grandmother, Cecilia. Lynne never knew or met her father, and had no personal relationships or connections with his side of the family. Although her mother was employed as a casting director for Thames Television, they lived frugally. In her work, Iris gained a reputation for being a stern and imposing individual.

Frederick was brought up in Market Harborough in Leicestershire. She occasionally faced social stigma due to her parents' divorce. She attended Notting Hill and Ealing High School in London. Her original career choice was to become a schoolteacher of physics and mathematics.

== Career ==
=== 1969–1974: Discovery and early roles ===
Frederick was discovered at the age of 15 by American actor and film director Cornel Wilde, who was a friend and colleague of her mother. Wilde had been looking for a young, unknown actress to star in his film adaptation of the best-selling post-apocalyptic science fiction novel The Death of Grass by John Christopher. Wilde first saw her when she came to work with her mother to pose for some test shots, and he immediately was smitten by her beauty, charisma, and bubbly personality. Despite her having no previous experience in theatre, films, or commercials, Wilde offered her the role without an audition.

When No Blade of Grass (1970) was released, the film received mixed reviews from critics. Notwithstanding the lukewarm reception of the film, Frederick became an overnight sensation, and her career quickly took off. Represented by the talent agency Hazel Malone Management, Frederick became a teen idol among the British public in the early 1970s, and was seen as the next Hayley Mills and Olivia Hussey. She was regularly featured in newspaper articles and fashion magazines as a model and cover girl. For a spread in the September 1971 edition of British Vogue, she was photographed by Patrick Lichfield. In addition, she appeared in several television commercials for products that included Camay soap. Frederick then signed a cosmetics contract with Mennen, and became a spokesmodel for Protein 21 shampoo, starring in nationwide print and television advertising campaigns. The Daily Express declared her "The Face of 1971", hailing her as one of Britain's more promising newcomers. In it, the copy read: "She has that indefinable something. Whatever it is it all adds up to a delightful image of rare and innocent beauty...that face of Lynne Frederick will be seen in many more films…".

In 1971, she appeared in the biographical film Nicholas and Alexandra (1971), in which she played the Grand Duchess Tatiana Nikolaevna of Russia, second eldest daughter of Tsar Nicholas II. For the film's press tour, she toured Europe with her three co-stars Ania Marson, Candace Glendenning, and Fiona Fullerton. That same year, she auditioned for the role of Alice in Alice's Adventures in Wonderland (1972), but lost the role to her friend Fiona Fullerton. Frederick was also first runner-up for the role of Saint Clare of Assisi in the Franco Zeffirelli production of Brother Sun, Sister Moon (1972), which ultimately went to Judi Bowker.

Her best-known appearance was in 1972 when she played Catherine Howard, in Henry VIII and His Six Wives. Her next role was in the 1972 family film The Amazing Mr. Blunden; in 1973, she won the Evening Standard British Film Award for Best New Actress. She continued to work in film and television projects throughout 1973 and 1974. Some of the shows in which she appeared were Wessex Tales, Follyfoot, The Generation Game, and an adaptation of The Canterville Ghost where she first met David Niven, who became a lifelong friend.

Frederick's most prominent television role came in 1974 when she appeared in three episodes of the critically acclaimed and Emmy-winning series The Pallisers. The series featured a huge cast of prominent and rising British actors, including Anthony Andrews, of whom she played the love interest.

=== 1975–1977: Adult stardom ===
Frederick landed a role in the Spanish romance film A Long Return (Largo retorno, 1975), where she played her first grown-up character. She also appeared alongside Fabio Testi in Four of the Apocalypse as well as in the adventure film Cormack of the Mounties. She returned to playing a teenaged character in the Spanish film El Vicio Y La Virtud (1975).

Frederick began 1976 with an appearance in a then controversial episode of the BBC series Play for Today, titled "The Other Woman", in which she played a sexually enigmatic girl who falls for a lesbian artist played by Jane Lapotaire. Later the same year, she delivered a critically acclaimed performance in the Oscar-nominated film Voyage of the Damned (1976). She followed that with a leading role in a Pete Walker slasher horror film Schizo (1976), a movie that became an underground hit in the horror film genre.

Along with Frederick's rising mainstream success as an actress, her modelling career was also taking off. Shifting her style and image to that of a more sophisticated glamour girl, Frederick emerged as a movie sex symbol of the late 1970s. Her profile expanded to Japan, and she became a frequent face in the Japanese entertainment magazine Screen. She was featured as a celebrity centrefold pin-up, and made the cover three times in the space of eighteen months. Frederick was also listed in several press and editorial publications as one of photographer Terry Fincher's muses.

By this point in her career, Frederick was earning over £4,000 (equivalent to £32,000 in 2024) per week for her film work alone. She was also being represented by A-list Hollywood agent Dennis Selinger, who represented internationally successful British actors such as Vanessa Redgrave, Michael Caine, and Sean Connery. Selinger was preparing Frederick for worldwide crossover stardom in mainstream film and television productions. In addition, Frederick had now reached the point where she no longer had to audition for roles, and she was being sent stacks of scripts and lucrative film offers.

=== 1978–1980: Career decline and blacklisting ===
Following her marriage to Peter Sellers in 1977, Frederick's career stalled for over a year as Sellers forced her to turn down all the acting offers she was receiving in order to tend him through poor health, including looking after him on the sets of his films. She attempted to make a career comeback in 1978, but the year-long absence had cost Frederick her burgeoning stardom.

Frederick campaigned and auditioned for several films. The role that she most desired, and spent a great deal of time lobbying for, was the leading role of Meggie Cleary in The Thorn Birds. Despite her lengthy and accomplished acting résumé, the producers selected Rachel Ward. Other roles she campaigned for included Cosette in the 1978 television adaptation of Les Misérables (1978), and Anne Sullivan in the television remake of The Miracle Worker (1979), neither of which she received. She made her final onscreen appearance with Sellers in the 1979 remake of The Prisoner of Zenda, which was a box-office and critical flop. Her final credit was as an executive producer on The Fiendish Plot of Dr. Fu Manchu (1980), Sellers' last film.

Following Sellers' death, his controversial will, the ongoing feuds with her stepchildren, and her short marriage to David Frost, Frederick became a figure of hate and ridicule in the press and other media. The Daily Mirror featured her in a list of disgraced public figures of 1980. Labelled as a "gold digger" and "professional wife", she was shunned and blacklisted from the film industry.

== Personal life ==
=== Marriages ===
Frederick's first marriage at age 22 was to Peter Sellers. They met at a dinner party in March 1976 when she was 21 and Sellers was 50, after Frederick had finished making Schizo (1976). Sellers initially proposed to her two days after their first meeting, but she turned him down. They courted for a year, he proposed to her again, and they eloped to Paris on 18 February 1977.

Writer Stephen Bach said of their relationship: "I noticed as he [Peter Sellers] rose, that not once in the long talkative afternoon had he let go of Lynne's hand, nor had she moved away. She transfused him simultaneously with calm and energy, and the hand he clung to was less a hand than a lifeline". He also added that he believed that Frederick had a "unique ability" to calm Sellers' manic moods; "the atmosphere was uneasy only until Lynne Frederick came into the room, exuding an aura of calm that somehow enveloped us all like an Alpine fragrance. She was only in her mid-twenties, but instantly observable as the mature center around which the household revolved, an emotional anchor that looked like a daffodil". David Niven, who was a friend to both Sellers and Frederick, had credited Sellers's happiness to Frederick being a devoted and loving wife.

Their marriage declined as Sellers' health deteriorated. He forced Frederick to forfeit her growing and lucrative acting career to care for him. Sellers's biographer Ed Sikov claimed that Frederick was offered a lucrative five-month job in Moscow where she was to lead a big-budgeted television miniseries, but Sellers insisted she should turn it down so that he would not be left alone.

The tension between them increased after the box-office and critical failure of The Prisoner of Zenda (1979), followed by negative tabloid reports of rumours of drug use, infidelity, domestic abuse, and other alleged conflicts. Despite their struggles, Frederick stood by Sellers and cared for him as his health continued to decline and he became more temperamental. Although they separated a number of times, they always came back together.

Sellers was in the process of excluding her from his will, according to a letter he wrote just before he died of a heart attack on 24 July 1980, the day before her 26th birthday. The planned changes to the will not having been finalised, she inherited almost his entire estate, worth an estimated £4.5 million (equivalent to £20.4 million in 2024), and his children received £800 each (£3,631 in 2024). Despite appeals from a number of Sellers's friends to make a fair settlement to the children, Frederick allegedly refused to give her stepchildren anything due to their rocky relationship with her and Sellers. After Sellers's death, her stepson Michael Sellers published P.S. I Love You: An Intimate Portrait of Peter Sellers, an exposé memoir concerning his relationship with his father. In the book, he accused Frederick of being a deceitful, cunning and narcissistic fraud who only married his father for his money. He also alleged that Frederick had cheated his sisters and him out of their inheritance by intentionally manipulating their father to alter the will in her favour. These accusations led to the press vilifying and labelling her as a "gold digger".

She briefly married David Frost (on 25 January 1981). Her supposed eagerness to remarry so quickly after Sellers's death caused a loss of reputation in the public eye, and was one of the major factors in her blacklisting. Before their marriage, Frederick had known Frost for several years, and they were occasional lovers in between relationships. Frederick divorced Frost after 17 months. During the course of their marriage, she suffered a miscarriage in March 1982.

In December 1982, she married U.S. cardiologist Barry Unger with whom she had her only child. Frederick and Unger divorced in 1991.

=== Later life ===
After losing her acting career, Frederick lived a private and reclusive life. When she divorced Frost, she faced public embarrassment when it was reported that she became intoxicated at a formal restaurant. Following this incident, she fled from England to the US, and never returned to her homeland. In later years, she was known for being fiercely private. Subsequently, she refused to give interviews and distanced herself from the celebrity lifestyle.

After her divorce from Barry Unger, Frederick lived in a Los Angeles mansion that had previously been owned by the actor Gary Cooper. She struggled with alcoholism, epileptic seizures and clinical depression. There were also rumours of nervous breakdowns and suicide attempts. Despite participating in numerous recovery treatments at hospitals and clinics, she was unable to rebuild her health. Weary after her years of public scorn and deteriorating conditions, she cloistered herself in her home for days at a time. Her mother Iris moved to California to live with Frederick to help care for her and her daughter.

Frederick was the sole manager of Sellers' estate. She took such pride in being Sellers' wife that she legally changed her last name to Sellers. It has been reported that when she took part in group therapy sessions, she introduced herself as "Lynne Sellers, the wife of Peter Sellers".

=== Relationships ===
Frederick, who never met her biological father, regarded actor David Niven as her substitute father. They first met while filming the television film adaptation of The Canterville Ghost (1974). They remained close friends over the years until Niven's death in 1983, which occurred just eight weeks after the birth of her daughter.

As a child, Frederick was very close to her mother Iris and grandmother Cecilia. Her relationship with her mother suffered major damage after she married Peter Sellers in 1977. Five days after the wedding, Iris spoke out against the marriage in an interview with the Daily Mirror:

"Time will tell, but I think Lynne has made a terrible mistake. I hope it will work for her sake. He [Peter Sellers] is a brilliant man, but not the kind of son in law I would have chosen. I wasn't invited to the ceremony, but that isn't surprising. When I heard it was taking place, I said: 'The sooner it happens, the sooner it will be over'. Somehow, in view of Sellers's previous record with the ladies who have gone before, I think this marriage may not last too long."

Feeling hurt and betrayed by this interview, Frederick did not see or speak to her mother again for the duration of her marriage to Sellers. When asked about cutting ties with her daughter, Iris said: "I have my own life to live. Of course I still love her. I've cried for her and I miss her a great deal. Lynne is right when she says we were terribly close and it hurts when I see her using the press to make me look the guilty party in all this."

After Sellers' death in 1980, Frederick reconciled with her mother. Despite its rekindling, their relationship was never the same again.

In 1972, while in her late teens, Frederick became involved with Curzon House Club casino owner Julian Posner, who like Sellers was 30 years her senior. They had an on-and-off relationship for about three years until 1975, while Frederick's acting career continued to blossom. During their off times, Frederick often discreetly engaged in affairs with her friend and future husband David Frost.

Frederick's relationship with her former stepchildren (Michael Sellers, Sarah Sellers, and Victoria Sellers) was, like Peter's relationship with them, distant and often strained. When Lynne began her relationship with Peter, she made efforts to establish a friendly connection with them. Sarah recalled of Frederick: "she seemed quite nice to begin with. I actually told dad that I thought she was a bit stupid. But she came across as very bubbly, friendly, warm and interested. But once they got married things definitely changed". Michael Sellers wrote of Frederick in his exposé memoir: "my first impression of Lynne didn't do much to alter my views. She was not exactly my idea of sweetness and light. It didn't concern me that she lacked the good looks of dad's past wives and girlfriends, but those innocent eyes, certainly her strongest feature, didn't deceive me". Michael Sellers also bluntly acknowledged his intentional hostility and lack of respect towards Frederick when they first met: "I'm afraid we weren't very kind in our judgement of Lynne. Sarah thought she wasn't too bright. But our views didn't really count for much. Because whatever our opinions, they would be of purely academic interest". Months after Frederick's death in 1994, Victoria said "I feel now that she's in hell – I don't know but that makes me feel better."

One of Frederick's close friends was Mauritian actress Françoise Pascal. The two first met when they co-starred on a 1972 episode of the television anthology series BBC Play of the Month, and they quickly became "firm friends". Pascal recalled that they remained friends for several years before losing touch after Frederick married Sellers in 1977. In April 2020, a few weeks before the 26th anniversary of Frederick's death, Pascal tweeted a photo of herself and Frederick, with the caption "I think of her very often! Always had that fresh baby face! RIP Lynne! Xxx".

In 2018, Judy Matheson revealed that she had worked with Frederick in the early 1970s. They were slated to appear in a film together that was to be shot in the Netherlands, with John Hamil, Robert Coleby, and Nina Francis. Because Frederick was young and a relative newcomer to filmmaking at the time, Matheson (who was a few years older and had industry experience) was asked to be Frederick's chaperone for the trip (as Frederick's mother was unavailable). They spent about three weeks lodged together in a hotel room before production on the film was prematurely closed due to financial withdrawals. Matheson stated that she enjoyed Frederick's company, and that they managed to have fun together despite the production difficulties. After returning to Great Britain, they corresponded for a while before gradually losing touch with each other.

During production of Four of the Apocalypse (1975), Frederick was rumoured to have had a brief romance with her co-star Fabio Testi (who was having trouble in his relationship with actress Ursula Andress at the time), which was also during a time when Frederick was having trouble in her own relationship with Julian Posner. This helped Testi and Frederick with their chemistry in the movie, and they were paired again for the film Cormack of the Mounties (1975). There has been much speculation about such a romance between Testi and Frederick, but it has not been confirmed.

In her 2014 memoir I Said Yes to Everything, Lee Grant claimed that during production of the film Voyage of the Damned (1976) Frederick, then aged 21, engaged in an affair with Sam Wanamaker, who was 35 years Frederick's senior and married to Charlotte Holland at the time. Grant also stated that she witnessed all the men on set, including the film's director Stuart Rosenberg, make salacious passes at Frederick, all of which she rejected.

Julie Andrews stated in her 2019 autobiography Home Work: A Memoir of My Hollywood Years that she suspected her husband Blake Edwards was having an affair with Frederick (who was married to Sellers at the time) during production of Revenge of the Pink Panther (1978). When Andrews confronted Edwards about the "flirtations" between him and Frederick, Andrews asked him point-blank which he preferred: staying married or continuing this flirtation. After this confrontation, Edwards apparently ceased any kind of flirtation with Frederick. She later had a falling-out with Edwards and Andrews after successfully suing them for their involvement with the film Trail of the Pink Panther (1982), claiming that it insulted Sellers' memory.

=== Political views and beliefs ===
In a 1975 interview with Men Only, Frederick stated that she "partially agreed" with Women's Lib. Stating "I agree with the fact that women should have equal rights", she added that she also believed in some old-fashioned gender roles. "I agree that there are certain things that men are designed to do; just as there are things women are designed to do. I think women are just as capable of ruling people and looking after our affairs as men are. Sometimes possibly better because women have a level of sensibility and sensitivity as well, which possibly men don't sometimes."

Although not queer herself, Frederick was known for being a blunt and outspoken advocate for same-sex relationships and LGBT rights during a time when it was considered highly taboo. Following her appearance on a controversial episode of the television series Play for Today, where she played a sexually fluid character and shared an onscreen kiss with her female co-star Jane Lapotaire, she said "with homosexuality and lesbianism, I just don't think you can put a ban on it. I don't think you can say it's wrong. I think people should live how they want to live. I don't think it should be illegal."

Frederick grew up as a Methodist. In a 1975 interview, she expressed some agnostic views when she was asked about a progressive Catholic priest's response to the pope's declaring premarital sex a sin. "I really agree with the other priests that it should have never been issued. I think that does put the Church back; I really do. I can say it because I'm not particularly religious. But I think people who are religious, I hope they would feel that it's not a step forward. I think premarital sex is a good idea. I think the worst thing that could possibly happen is to not have sex before you get married, then get married and find out it's dreadful." After Peter Sellers died, she went to visit spiritualist and psychic medium Doris Collins. When asked if she believed in life after death, she replied "I've always believed that death was not the end". Frederick later suggested in an interview that she still retained her Methodist faith: "I never touch hard liquor. I suppose wine is okay for a good Methodist like me".

=== Philanthropy ===
Following the death of Peter Sellers, Frederick became involved in donating to various heart charities.

In November 1980, she bought and donated an echocardiograph (valued at £12,400) to the Middlesex Hospital in London where Sellers died of a heart attack. Frederick stated "I wanted to try and reciprocate in some way to the enormous love and care which staff here showed my husband".

After her own death in 1994, she left individual sums of $250,000 to the British Heart Foundation and the Middlesex Hospital in London as tribute to Sellers. As a sign of gratitude, the Middlesex Hospital hung a plaque thanking both Sellers and Frederick for their generous contributions.

=== Trail of the Pink Panther (1982) lawsuit ===
Shortly after the release of Trail of the Pink Panther (1982), Frederick filed a suit against MGM, United Artists, and film director Blake Edwards for $3 million in damages and to block the film's distribution. She claimed that the film tarnished Sellers' reputation and that it was made without authorisation from his estate, which she controlled.

At the High Court in London, the defence argued that the film was meant to be a tribute to Sellers, but Frederick stated "It was an appalling film: Not a tribute to my husband but an insult to his memory". Her chief objection was that her late husband had specifically prohibited the use of outtakes from earlier Pink Panther films in his lifetime, and that his estate should have had the right to control the use of outtakes after his death. The idea of using outtakes in future Pink Panther films was first presented in Sellers' lifetime when Edwards had shot and edited a three-hour version of The Pink Panther Strikes Again (1976). However, United Artists objected to this long version, and the film was trimmed from three hours to an hour and a half.

After Sellers' death in 1980, United Artists, wanting to cash in on the continuation of the series, elected Edwards to construct a new film from outtakes and deleted scenes from the five previous Pink Panther movies featuring Sellers. A handful of new material involving other actors was specially filmed for inclusion. Some of the older material dated as far back as 1963. The lack of continuity was evident in many scenes, and was mocked by film critics.

In 1985, Judge Charles Hobhouse ruled in favour of Frederick, awarding her $1 million, but dismissed her request to ban the film. Frederick stated "I hope this proves that I'm not a gold digger! I've risked my entire fortune and the financial future of my daughter to protect Peter's reputation." After the lawsuit Frederick continued to guard Sellers' films.

== Death ==
On 27 April 1994, Frederick was found dead by her mother in her West Los Angeles home, aged 39. Foul play and suicide were ruled out, and a post-mortem failed to determine the cause of death. Her remains were cremated at Golders Green Crematorium in London, and her ashes were interred with those of Peter Sellers.

In a 1995 interview with Hello!, her mother Iris said Lynne died from natural causes which were brought on by a seizure in her sleep. She denied accusations that her daughter had a problem with drugs including alcohol.

There is absolutely no truth in any of the stories I have read about Lynne's death. I never saw Lynne taking cocaine. She liked a glass of wine, but so do most people and she was no more an alcoholic than the next person. The autopsy report was quite clear, her death was by natural causes. Lynne died of a seizure in her sleep. For the record, the coroner found no evidence that Lynne had been taking drugs.

== Legacy ==
In the years after her death, Frederick's legacy remained poisoned. In the 1995 revision of his 1994 book The Life and Death of Peter Sellers, Roger Lewis claimed that "there is yet to find a single person to say a good thing about Lynne". Nigel Dempster had a profound dislike for Frederick and referred to her as an "avaricious and cunning man-eater". Other people who have voiced unfavourable views of Frederick include Spike Milligan, Britt Ekland, Roger Moore, and Wendy Richard.

Frederick received minimal attention in the 2004 film adaptation of Lewis's book where she was portrayed by Emilia Fox. All scenes featuring Fox's portrayal of Frederick were deleted from the final cut of the film, but included in the supplemental features of the film's DVD release. On portraying Frederick, Fox stated: "I had thought very carefully about playing Lynne. I wanted to represent her in a way that I thought was fair – which was a very young girl being taken up in this world of laughter and light, and then finding out the reality. Peter Sellers was completely obsessed by work, and it's very difficult to live with someone like that."

Over time, views toward Frederick's image gradually shifted, with some claiming that she has gained a cult following through her films, while another blogger called her one of the most promising, talented, and beautiful young British actresses of the 1970s. Many credit the negative events in her life (the loss of her acting career, blacklisting in Hollywood, and untimely death) to her marriage to Sellers. Even Roger Lewis, who was blunt about his disdain for Frederick, admitted that "of all of Sellers's wives, Lynne Frederick was the most poorly treated". One of the early people to advocate for Frederick was American author Ed Sikov in the 2002 book Mr. Strangelove: A Biography of Peter Sellers: "Lynne Frederick deserves a bit of compassion herself in retrospect. It was the helpless Peter she nursed, the dependent and infantile creature of impulse and consequent contradiction. Patiently she ministered him". Other people who have defended or come forward with positive recollections of Frederick over the years include Judy Matheson, Françoise Pascal, John Moulder-Brown, Mark Burns, Fabio Testi, Malcolm McDowell (who played her lover in Voyage of the Damned), and Graham Crowden.

In 1982, Frederick's screen appearance as Catherine Howard from the film Henry VIII and His Six Wives (1972) was used on the cover art for the 1982 novel The Dark Rose by Cynthia Harrod-Eagles.

For her work in horror films, Frederick has garnered significant popularity as a scream queen. In 2014, her image from the film poster of Schizo (1976) was featured in a montage for the cover of the publication X-CERT 2: The British Independent Horror Film: 1971–1983 by John Hamilton. The horror film Phase IV has also gained a cult following.

The Times obituary for Frederick called her the "Olivia Hussey of her day".

== Filmography ==
=== Film ===
Year	Title	Role	Notes
1970	No Blade of Grass	Mary Custance	film debut
1971	Nicholas and Alexandra	Grand Duchess Tatiana Nikolaevna	
1971	Vampire Circus	Dora Müller	
1972	Henry VIII and His Six Wives	Catherine Howard	Evening Standard British Film Award for Best New Coming Actress
1972	The Amazing Mr. Blunden	Lucy Allen	Evening Standard British Film Award for Best New Coming Actress
1973	Keep an Eye on Denise	Denise	television film
1974	The Lady from the Sea	Hilde	television film
1974	Phase IV	Kendra Eldridge	
1974	The Canterville Ghost	Virginia Otis	television film
1975	Four of the Apocalypse	Emmanuella "Bunny" O'Neill	
1975	Cormack of the Mounties	Elizabeth	
1975	A Long Return	Anna Ortega	
1975	The Vice and Virtue	Rosa	
1976	Schizo	Samantha Grey/Jean	
1976	Voyage of the Damned	Anna Rosen	
1977	Hazlitt in Love	Sarah Walker	television film
1979	The Prisoner of Zenda	Princess Flavia	

=== Television ===
Year	Title	Role	Notes
1971	Now, Take My Wife	Jenny Love	series 1, episode 1: "Just Harry and Me"
1971	Comedy Playhouse	Jenny Love	series 11, episode 1: "Just Harry and Me"
1971	Fathers and Sons	Dunyasha	series 1, episode 1
1972	BBC Play of the Month	Nellie Ewell	series 7, episode 5: "Summer and Smoke"^{‡}
1972	Softly, Softly: Taskforce	Judith "Judy" Oram	series 3, episode 17: "Anywhere in the Wide World"
1972	Opportunity Knocks	Never Again	series 12, episode 25: "The Script Writers Chart Show"
1973	No Exit	Abigail "Abby"	series 1, episode 3: "A Man's Fair Share of Days"
1973	Away from It All	Vinca	series 1, episode 1: "The Ripening Seed"
1973	Follyfoot	Tina	series 3, episode 8: "The Bridge Builder", episode 9: "Uncle Joe"
1973	Wessex Tales	Rosa Harlborough	series 1, episode 1: "A Tragedy of Two Ambitions"
1973	The Generation Game	Cinderella	series 3, episode 17: "1973 Christmas Special"
1974	Masquerade	Natalie Fieldman	series 1, episode 3: "Mizzen ab!"
1974	The Pallisers	Isabel Boncassen	series 1, episodes 24, 25, and 26
1976	Play for Today	Nicola "Nikki" Cole	series 6, episode 11: "The Other Woman"
1976	Space: 1999	Shermeen Williams	series 2, episode 15: "A Matter of Balance"

‡ denotes lost film

== Discography ==
=== Live performances ===
Title	Year	Other artist(s)
"If You Were the Only Girl in the World"^{៛}	1973	Bruce Forsyth

៛ Performed live 25 December 1973 on the BBC show The Generation Game

== Awards and nominations ==
Year	Association	Category	Nominated work	Result
1973	Evening Standard British Film Awards	Best Newcomer – Actress	The Amazing Mr. Blunden (1972) and Henry VIII and His Six Wives (1972)	Won
