= The Amazing Mr. Blunden (2021 film) =

2021 British film by Mark Gatiss

- Written by: Mark Gatiss
- Directed by: Mark Gatiss
- Starring: Madeline Smith; Mark Gatiss; Rosalyn Landor; Simon Callow; Tamsin Greig; Vinette Robinson; Sam Spruell; Liz White
- Music by: Blair Mowat
- Country of origin: United Kingdom
- Original language: English

Production
- Producers: Isibeal Ballance; Richelle Wilder
- Cinematography: David Higgs
- Editor: Mark Everson
- Running time: 90 mins
- Production company: Adorable Media

Original release
- Network: Sky Max
- Release: 24 December 2021

The Amazing Mr. Blunden is a 2021 fantasy television film, written and directed by Mark Gatiss and is a remake of Lionel Jeffries' 1972 film The Amazing Mr. Blunden. Both films were based on the 1969 novel The Ghosts by Antonia Barber.

It features cameo appearances by Madeline Smith and Rosalyn Landor who both appeared in the 1972 version.

== Plot ==
Modern teenagers Lucy and Jamie become caretakers of a ruined house that's haunted.

== Cast ==
- Simon Callow as Mr Blunden
- Mark Gatiss as Mr Wickens
- Tamsin Greig as Mrs Wickens
- Vinette Robinson as Mrs Allen
- Tsion Habte as Lucy
- Jason Rennie as Jamie
- India Fowler as Sara
- Xavier Wilkins as Georgie
- Kitty Archer as Bella
- Spike Fearn as Tom
- Samuel Barnett as Mr Smith
- Raj Ghatak as Doctor
- Sean Gilder as Dave Tucker
- Katherine Jakeways as Julie
- Rosalyn Landor as Mrs Monk Burton
- Amanda Lawrence as Meakin
- Elliot Levey as Claverton
- Madeline Smith as Geraldine
- Sam Spruell as Bertie
- Liz White as Jill Tucker
- Zanele Dliwayo as Baby Ben
- Ferguson Levi as Baby Ben
- Ferguson Malachi as Baby Ben
- Idris Yusuf as Baby Ben
- Mark Kermode as Mr Karras
- Kim Newman as Mr Merrin

== Reception ==
The Telegraph 's review gave the film four out of five stars.
