= Rosalyn Landor =

British actress

Rosalyn Landor (born 7 October 1958) is an English film, television and stage actress and audio book narrator.

== Early life ==
Landor was born in 1958 in Hampstead, London, the daughter of English actor and radio presenter Neil Landor and of an Irish mother. Landor was educated at the Royal Ballet School, Richmond, and at Tolworth Girls' School, in Surbiton, Surrey. A child actress in films in the late 1960s and early 1970s, she began her career at the age of nine, when she appeared in the Hammer Horror film The Devil Rides Out (1968).

== Career ==
Landor appeared in Jane Eyre (1970), playing Helen Burns, with Susannah York as the adult Jane Eyre. She co-starred in the film The Amazing Mr. Blunden (1972), based on the book The Ghosts by Antonia Barber, and appeared opposite Richard Burton and Elizabeth Taylor in the TV film Divorce His, Divorce Hers (1973). She made many appearances on British and American television during the 1980s, with roles including Allison in Hammer House of Horror: "Guardian Of The Abyss" (1980), Polly Hampton in Thames Television's Love in a Cold Climate, Fiona Allways in four episodes of Rumpole of the Bailey (1983), Wendy De Souza in Oxbridge Blues (1984) and Pru Standfast in C.A.T.S. Eyes (1985). She played Guinevere in the TV film Arthur the King (1985), and Helen Stoner in Granada's TV adaptation of Sherlock Holmes short story "The Speckled Band" opposite Jeremy Brett.

Her theatre roles have included Sorel in Hay Fever by Noël Coward in London's West End in 1984 with Penelope Keith and Moray Watson, and Raina in Shaw's Arms and the Man at Leicester's Haymarket Theatre opposite Malcolm Sinclair.

In the United States, Landor's television guest appearances have included Star Trek: The Next Generation (in the 1989 episode "Up the Long Ladder"), Matlock and Hunter. She played the major role of Thelma Morgan Converse in the mini-series Little Gloria... Happy at Last (1982) and Britt in the 1990 film Bad Influence opposite Rob Lowe and James Spader.

Landor has narrated multiple audiobooks, including titles by Jane Austen, Mary Balogh, Elizabeth Chadwick, Alexandre Dumas, Erin Hart, Anne Holt, Julia London, Julianne MacLean, Edith Nesbit, Charles Todd, and Julia Quinn.

== Personal life ==
Landor moved to the west coast of the U.S. in the second half of the 1980s, returning to London in the 1990s. She has two daughters. She continues with her career, including voice work for Disney and audiobooks for Random House as a narrator.

== Feature films ==
- The Devil Rides Out (1968)
- Jane Eyre (1970)
- The Amazing Mr. Blunden (1972)
- Divorce His, Divorce Hers (1973)
- Little Gloria... Happy at Last (1982)
- Arthur the King (1985)
- Bad Influence (1990)
- Dirge of Cerberus: Final Fantasy VII (2006)
