= James Bentley (actor) =

British actor (born 1992)

- Born: July 14, 1992 (age 34)
- Years active: 2000–2010

James Bentley (born 14 July 1992) is an English actor. He won a Young Artist Award for playing Nicholas Stewart in the 2001 psychological horror film The Others.

In 2004, Bentley played Michael Sellers in The Life and Death of Peter Sellers, Young Nero in Imperium: Nero and a double for John Sessions in Stella Street.

Bentley won the Nottingham New Theatre award for Best Actor in a Leading Role in 2013. He found further success in 2014 when he won the award for a second time running. In 2015 he became a fellow of the aforementioned theatre.

He is currently a backstage manager, his most previous engagement being 'Half a Sixpence'.
