= Saki (TV series) =

1962 British TV anthology series

- Country of origin: United Kingdom
- No. of series: 1
- No. of episodes: 8

Production
- Producer: Philip Mackie
- Production company: Granada

Original release
- Network: ITV
- Release: 6 July – 24 August 1962

Saki is a 1962 British television series which was produced by Granada Television and aired on ITV. It was an anthology series adapting the works of writer Saki (born Hector Hugh Munro). Eight episodes were produced.

Unlike many British television series of the 1960s, the programme survives intact.

== Credits ==
=== Cast ===
- Martita Hunt as Lady Bastable
- William Mervyn as Sir Hector
- Mark Burns as Clovis Sangrail
- Fenella Fielding as Mary Drakmanton
- Richard Vernon as The Major
- Rosamund Greenwood as Veronique Brimley-Bomefield

=== Credits ===
- Producer - Philip Mackie
- Adapted by - Edward Boyd & Hugh Leonard
- Script Editor - Gerald Savory
- Designers - Peter Phillips, Roy Stonehouse & Darrell Lass
- Directors - Gordon Flemyng & Silvio Narizzano
