= The Other Woman (Play for Today) =

- Play for Today episode
- Directed by: Michael Simpson
- Written by: Watson Gould
- Cinematography by: Michael Williams
- Original air date: 6 January 1976
- Running time: 71 minutes

"The Other Woman" is a 1976 Play for Today which aired 6 January 1976, written by Watson Gould and directed by Michael Simpson.

Filmed on a small budget in June 1975, it features Jane Lapotaire, Lynne Frederick, and Michael Gambon.

The plot revolves around the life of Kim (Lapotaire), a custodian/artist and self identifying lesbian with a turbulent upbringing. She meets 17-year-old Nikki (Frederick), a closeted, sexually fluid girl who has a seemingly perfect background. As their relationship progresses, Kim discovers problems Nikki faced despite her privileged upbringing, and her obligation to a pre-arranged heterosexual marriage.

The episode received mostly positive reviews from critics, but generated some mild controversy for its frank and clichéd depiction of lesbian stereotypes. The brief onscreen kiss between Jane Lapotaire and Lynne Frederick was also met with some criticism from older and more conservative audiences. Frederick and Lapotaire, both supporters of gay rights, were unapologetic about the controversy and stood by their performances.

== Cast ==
- Jane Lapotaire as Kim
- Lynne Frederick as Niki
- Michael Gambon as Robin
- Rosalind Adams as Rose
- Eve Pearce as Louise
- Benedict Taylor as Ben
- Barbara Atkinson as Aunt Darnley
- Leon Sinden as Miles Darnley
- John Joyce as Barman
