= The Amazing Mr. Blunden =

1972 British film by Lionel Jeffries

- Directed by: Lionel Jeffries
- Written by: Antonia Barber (book); Lionel Jeffries (adaptation)
- Produced by: Barry Levinson
- Starring: Laurence Naismith; Lynne Frederick; Garry Miller; Rosalyn Landor; Marc Granger; Diana Dors; Madeline Smith; James Villiers
- Cinematography: Gerry Fisher
- Edited by: Teddy Darvas
- Music by: Elmer Bernstein
- Production company: Hemisphere Productions
- Distributed by: Hemdale
- Release date: December 1972
- Running time: 100 minutes
- Country: United Kingdom
- Language: English

The Amazing Mr. Blunden is a 1972 British family mystery film involving ghosts directed by Lionel Jeffries. It was written by Jeffries and Antonia Barber based on Barber's 1969 novel The Ghosts. It stars Laurence Naismith, Lynne Frederick, Garry Miller, Rosalyn Landor, Marc Granger, Diana Dors, Madeline Smith, and James Villiers.

== Plot ==
In 1918, war widow, Mrs. Allen and her children, Lucy, Jamie and baby Benjamin are reduced to living in a squalid Camden Town flat. Just before Christmas, a mysterious old man, Mr Frederick Percival Blunden visits the family, introducing himself as a representative of a firm of solicitors. The family are told there is an opportunity to become the caretakers of a derelict country mansion in the Home Counties named Langley Park, which was gutted by fire years before, and is now in the charge of the solicitors. Mrs. Allen takes the post despite rumours that the house is haunted, her instructions to care for the property until such time as the heirs to the estate can be traced. The air of mystery deepens when the children see a portrait at the solicitors office of a man they believe to be Mr Blunden. The solicitor confirms this, but reveals that the portrait is of a man called Mr Blunden, who has been dead for a hundred years, the present Mr Blunden being his great-grandson.

After they have settled into the new post, Lucy and Jamie see two ghostly figures in the grounds of the house: a teenage girl, Sara Latimer, and her younger brother, Georgie. They are two children who lived in the house a century earlier. Sara tells them that she and her brother are orphans, under the care of their dissolute and hapless Uncle Bertie and the solicitor Mr Blunden, until Georgie comes of age. Bertie marries a music hall performer, Bella Wickens and her parents then move into Langley Park, ostensibly as the housekeeper and game keeper. The children come to suspect that Mrs. Wickens and her disturbed violent husband are plotting to kill them to get hold of Georgie's inheritance. Sara and Georgie find a book with instructions for travelling through time, so that they can get help. Lucy and Jamie agree to travel back with them; they arrange to meet Sara the next day.

Jamie searches the graveyard, in the hope of finding nothing and being able to go back to help, knowing in advance that they will succeed. He and Lucy are shocked to find a gravestone marked with the names of both Sara and Georgie. The sexton explains that the two children died in a fire, whose anniversary turns out to be exactly a hundred years ago tomorrow. The children meet Mr Blunden who admits he has been tormented for over a hundred years because of the events but promises if they both help no harm will come to them. Lucy and Jamie drink the potion and travel back to 1818 in the hope of preventing the tragedy. There they meet Thomas the gardener who believes they are from America, and tells Lucy and Jamie that he wants to go there one day and make his fortune. Mr Blunden is visiting the house that night, but refuses to listen to Sara's pleas for help.

That night the children are locked in a room above the library, and given a sleeping potion. Mr Wickens starts a fire in the library, trapping the children. Jamie helps Tom to save Sara, but when he tries to return for Georgie, he finds himself unable to get through the flames. Mr Blunden appears, and tells Jamie that they will go together, holding hands. Jamie is kept safe from the fire, but Mr Blunden suffers the pain that Jamie would have felt. Jamie and Mr Blunden save Georgie, with Blunden perishing in the fire as the staircase gives way, a serene smile on his face. The Wickens perish in the fire. Lucy and Jamie both return to 1918, but Jamie is unconscious and Lucy cannot tell their mother what has happened.

At the graveyard, Lucy discovers that the children's gravestone has been replaced by another: that of Frederick Percival Blunden, the "Good Shepherd" who "died to save the children in his care". Jamie soon awakes and is overjoyed to hear that they have succeeded. Shortly after, the lawyer, Mr Clutterbuck, visits them and informs them that recently discovered documents show that Sara Latimer married Thomas and that their great-grandson was the late Mr. Allen. This makes Jamie the rightful heir to the Langley Park.

At the end a car pulls up. When Mr Clutterbuck opens the door, sitting inside is Mr Blunden! But which one? The enigmatic phrase he greets them with ("We three kings of Orient are") is one they recognise from their first encounter. They have all the answers they need.

The film ends with the cast saying goodbye to the audience one by one as their names are shown on-screen.

== Cast ==
- Laurence Naismith as Frederick Percival Blunden
- Lynne Frederick as Lucy Allen
- Garry Miller as Jamie Allen
- Rosalyn Landor as Sara Latimer
- Marc Granger as Georgie Latimer
- Diana Dors as Mrs. Wickens
- Dorothy Alison as Mrs. Allen
- James Villiers as Uncle Bertie
- Madeline Smith as Bella Wickens
- David Lodge as Mr. Wickens
- Stuart Lock as Tom Fletcher
- Deddie Davies as Miss Meakin
- Graham Crowden as Mr. Clutterbuck
- Erik Chitty as Mr. Claverton
- Reg Lye as Sexton
- Paul Eddington as Vicar

== Production ==
=== Casting ===
Lionel Jeffries originally promised Sally Thomsett the role of Lucy. She had been cast in the film but shortly before production began she was forced to withdraw from the film due to personal problems that she was dealing with at the time and Lynne Frederick replaced her.

Rosalyn Landor and Lynne Frederick had both just come off of auditioning and being turned down for the role of Alice in Alice’s Adventures In Wonderland (1972) before being cast in this film. Diana Dors had a key support role.

Spike Milligan, Gert Fröbe, Gene Wilder, David Niven, Michael Gough, David Tomlinson, Peter Cushing, Christopher Lee, Donald Pleasence and Robert Helpmann were all considered for the role of Mr. Blunden.

Editor Teddy Darvas said "that was done at Pinewood and it was a small budget film. Again the casting was excellent... It's a very, very nice ghost story which was a very big success."

=== Filming ===
The film was shot at Pinewood Studios in June and July 1972, with location filming around the village and church at Hedgerley, Buckinghamshire. The fire-ravaged derelict stately home was in fact Heatherden Hall, on the estate of which the studios are located and which at that time served as administration offices for the production facilities.

== Release ==
=== Certification ===
The film was passed uncut by the British Board of Film Censors with a U certificate (Suitable for all ages).

== Awards ==
Lynne Frederick won the Evening Standard British Film Award for "Best New Coming Actress" in 1973 in part for her work on this film.

== Home media ==
Limited edition Blu-ray was released in the UK on 9 December 2019 by Second Sight.

== See also ==
- The Amazing Mr. Blunden, a TV movie adaptation released in 2021, written and directed by Mark Gatiss.
