= The Others (2001 film) =

Horror film by Alejandro Amenábar

- Theatrical release poster
- Spanish: Los otros
- Directed by: Alejandro Amenábar
- Written by: Alejandro Amenábar
- Produced by: Fernando Bovaira; José Luis Cuerda; Sunmin Park
- Starring: Nicole Kidman; Fionnula Flanagan; Christopher Eccleston; Elaine Cassidy; Eric Sykes; Alakina Mann; James Bentley
- Cinematography: Javier Aguirresarobe
- Edited by: Nacho Ruiz Capillas
- Music by: Alejandro Amenábar
- Production companies: Las Producciones del Escorpión; Sogecine; Cruise-Wagner Productions
- Distributed by: Warner Sogefilms (Spain); Dimension Films (United States); Mars Distribution (France); Studio Canal (International)
- Release dates: August 10, 2001 (United States); September 7, 2001 (Spain)
- Running time: 104 minutes
- Countries: Spain; United States; France
- Language: English
- Budget: $17 million
- Box office: $210 million

The Others (Spanish: Los otros) is a 2001 psychological and Gothic horror film written, directed and scored by Alejandro Amenábar, starring Nicole Kidman, Fionnula Flanagan, Christopher Eccleston, Elaine Cassidy, Eric Sykes, Alakina Mann and James Bentley. Set in 1945 in Jersey, it focuses on a woman and her two photosensitive children who experience supernatural phenomena in their manor after the arrival of new servants.

The Others was theatrically released in the United States on August 10, 2001, by Dimension Films, and in Spain on September 7, 2001, by Warner Sogefilms. It was a major critical and commercial success, grossing $210 million worldwide on a $17 million budget. Critics praised the atmosphere, performances (particularly Kidman), and plot twist.

At the 16th Goya Awards, The Others earned a leading fifteen nominations and won in eight categories, including Best Film, Best Director, and Best Original Screenplay. It was the first English-language film without Spanish dialogue to win Best Film at Spain's Goya Awards. It received six nominations at the 28th Saturn Awards, winning Best Horror Film, Best Actress (for Kidman), and Best Supporting Actress (for Flanagan). It was nominated for Best Actress in a Leading Role (for Kidman) and Best Original Screenplay at the 55th British Academy Film Awards, and for Best Film at the 14th European Film Awards. Kidman was nominated for Best Actress in a Motion Picture – Drama at the 59th Golden Globe Awards.

== Plot ==
In 1945, Grace Stewart resides in a remote country house in Jersey, a Channel Island formerly occupied by the Germans. As her young children, Anne and Nicholas, suffer from a severe sensitivity to light, Grace keeps the home darkened with heavy curtains. One day, Mrs. Bertha Mills, Edmund Tuttle and the mute Lydia arrive seeking employment. Grace hires them as the housekeeper, gardener, and maid, and learns they worked in the house years earlier.

Anne claims to be visited by a young boy named Victor, his parents, and an elderly blind woman. Grace believes this is a fantasy, but after she hears footsteps and voices, she orders the house to be searched for intruders. In a storage room, she finds a nineteenth-century album containing photographs of corpses. Mrs. Mills recounts that many left the house in 1891 due to an outbreak of tuberculosis. Grace begins to fear there are supernatural entities in the house, but struggles to reconcile this with her Catholic faith.

Grace witnesses a piano playing itself and becomes convinced that the house is haunted. She runs outside in search of the local priest to bless the house and instructs Tuttle to check the gardens to see if a family has been buried there. Mrs. Mills instructs Tuttle to conceal gravestones with leaves. In the woods, Grace runs into her husband, Charles, whom she thought was killed in World War II, and brings him back to the house.

One day, Grace checks on Anne playing. To her horror, she finds an old woman wearing Anne's veiled communion dress who speaks in Anne's voice. Grace attacks the woman but finds she has actually attacked Anne. Charles tells Grace he must return to the front, rejecting her insistence that the war is over. He leaves the next morning.

Grace is horrified to find all of the curtains in the house have been removed, exposing Anne and Nicholas to sunlight. She accuses the servants and expels them. That night, the children discover that the headstones in the cemetery belong to the servants, and flee when the servants approach them. Grace finds a postmortem photograph of Mrs. Mills, Tuttle and Lydia, who all perished during the 1891 tuberculosis outbreak. Mrs. Mills tells Grace to talk to the "intruders".

Grace discovers that the elderly blind woman is a medium holding a séance with Victor's parents. They have discovered via automatic writing that Grace, despondent after Charles died in the war, smothered her children with a pillow and shot herself. Aghast, Grace realizes that the intruders are the living family, and that she, her children and the servants are haunting the house.

Embracing her children, Grace admits to her act of murder–suicide: she awoke after her suicide and believed that God had brought everyone back to life for a second chance. Victor and his family move out. Anne and Nicholas realize that sunlight no longer hurts them and enjoy it for the first time. The house goes up for sale and Mrs. Mills informs the Stewarts that they will have to learn to cohabit with future inhabitants. Grace and the children affirm that the house is theirs and that they will not leave.

== Cast ==
- Nicole Kidman as Grace Stewart
- Fionnula Flanagan as Bertha Mills
- Christopher Eccleston as Charles Stewart
- Alakina Mann as Anne Stewart
- James Bentley as Nicholas Stewart
- Alexander Vince as Victor
- Eric Sykes as Edmund Tuttle
- Elaine Cassidy as Lydia
- Keith Allen as Mr. Marlish
- Renée Asherson as the Old Lady
- Michelle Fairley as Mrs. Marlish
- Gordon Reid as Assistant

== Production ==
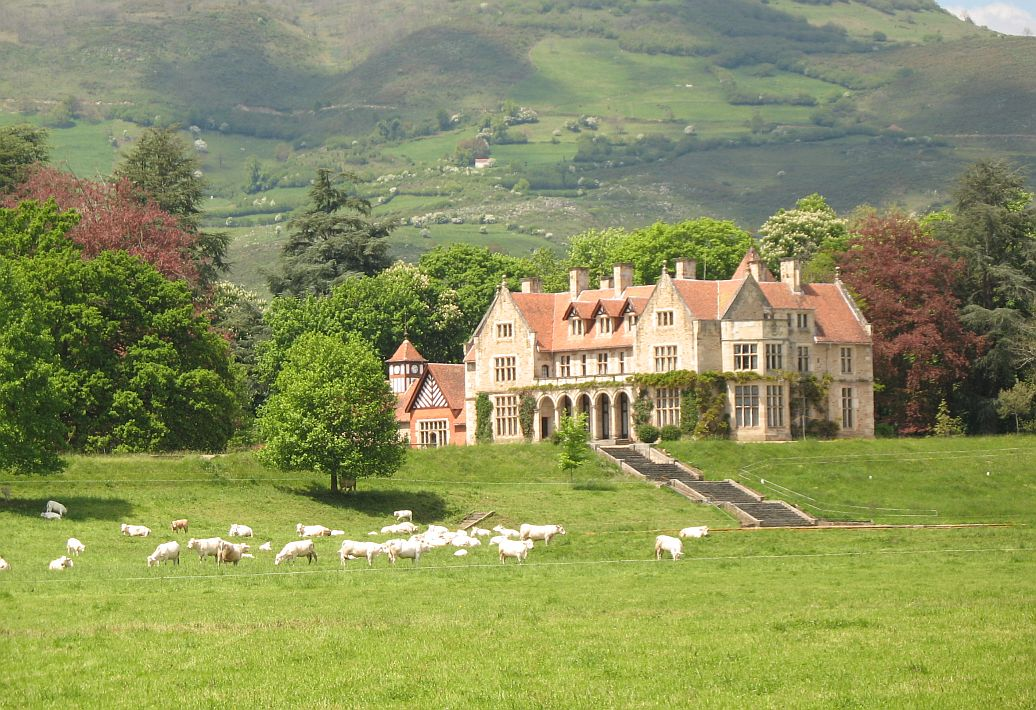
Palacio de los Hornillos, in Las Fraguas, Arenas de Iguña

Filming locations included Madrid and the Palacio de los Hornillos mansion in Las Fraguas, Spain. William Skidelsky of The Observer suggested that it was inspired by the 1898 novella The Turn of the Screw by Henry James.

== Reception ==
=== Box office ===
The Others was released in the United States and Canada by Dimension Films, opening on August 10, 2001 in 1,678 theaters. It grossed $14 million its opening weekend, ranking fourth at the U.S. box office behind American Pie 2, Rush Hour 2 and The Princess Diaries. It stayed in fourth place for three more weeks, expanding to more theaters. During the weekend of September 21 to 23, it was second at the box office, grossing $5 million in 2,801 theaters. The film, which cost $17 million to produce, grossed $96.5 million in the United States and Canada. It grossed $24 million in Spain, becoming the highest-grossing Spanish film of all time, beating the record set earlier that year by Torrente 2: Mission in Marbella. It grossed $113.4 million in other territories, for a worldwide total of $210 million.

=== Critical response ===
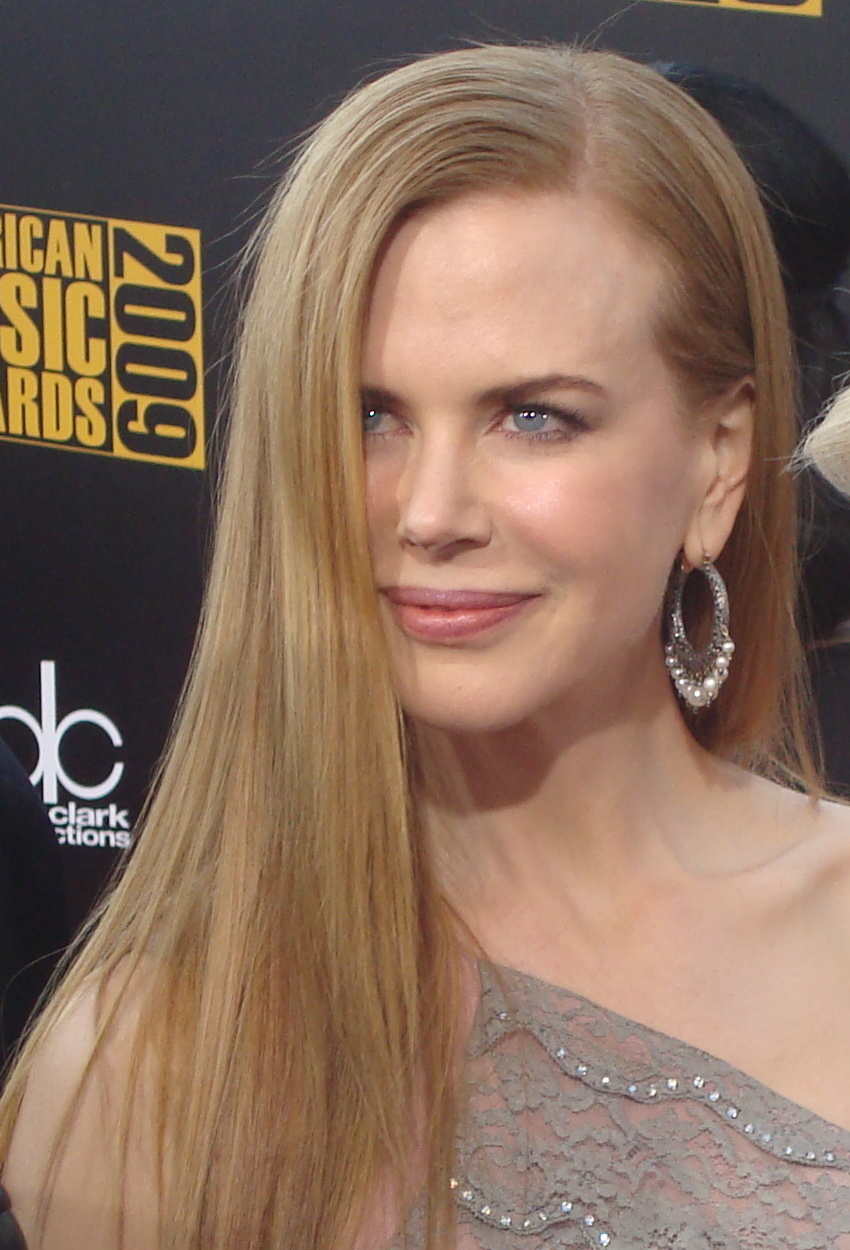
Nicole Kidman's performance received acclaim.

On the review aggregator website Rotten Tomatoes, 84% of 174 critics' reviews are positive. The website's consensus reads: "The Others is a spooky thriller that reminds us that a movie doesn't need expensive special effects to be creepy." Metacritic, which uses a weighted average, assigned the film a score of 74 out of 100, based on 29 critics, indicating "generally favorable" reviews. Audiences polled by CinemaScore gave the film an average grade of "B" on an A+ to F scale.

A. O. Scott of The New York Times wrote: "The Others is a flawed if interesting vehicle. The anxious indeterminacy of the first section proves hard to sustain, and as Mr. Amenábar moves away from elegant minimalism, the story begins to become cluttered and confusing, rather than spare and enigmatic." Scott highlighted Kidman's performance, writing that she "embodies this unstable amalgam with a conviction that is in itself terrifying. The icy reserve that sometimes stands in the way of her expressive gifts here becomes the foundation of her most emotionally layered performance to date."

Roger Ebert gave The Others two and a half out of four, writing: "Alejandro Amenábar has the patience to create a languorous, dreamy atmosphere, and Nicole Kidman succeeds in convincing us that she is a normal person in a disturbing situation and not just a standard-issue horror movie hysteric." However, he felt that "in drawing out his effects, Amenábar is a little too confident that style can substitute for substance".

Neil Smith of the BBC awarded The Others four out of five, writing: "Shot in oppressive sepia amid near-darkness (Grace's children having a rare ailment that precludes exposure to sunlight), Amenábar racks up the tension to unbearable levels." Time Out praised it as "confident and controlled... Absence makes the heart beat faster: the absence of light, the corporeal absence of loved ones. Shrewdly cast, Kidman is pitch perfect. It's a clammy, ingenious film, one of the best studio movies of the year."

Kenneth Turan of the Los Angeles Times cited Kidman's performance as the greatest strength, writing that she "has thrown herself into her role as if it were Lady Macbeth on the London stage, with formidable results. Though Kidman doesn't hesitate to make Grace high-strung and as tightly wound as they come, she also projects vulnerability and courage when they're called for. It's an intense, involving performance, and it dominates and energizes a film that would be lost without it." In 2025, The Hollywood Reporter named The Others the 14th-greatest horror film of the 21st century.

=== Accolades ===
Institution	Category	Recipient	Result	Ref.
British Academy Film Awards	Best Actress in a Leading Role	Nicole Kidman	Nominated	
British Academy Film Awards	Best Original Screenplay	Alejandro Amenábar	Nominated	
Fangoria Chainsaw Awards	Best Actress	Nicole Kidman	Won	
Fangoria Chainsaw Awards	Best Supporting Actress	Fionnula Flanagan	Nominated	
Fangoria Chainsaw Awards	Best Wide-Release Film	The Others	Nominated	
Golden Globe Awards	Best Actress in a Motion Picture – Drama	Nicole Kidman	Nominated	
GoldSpirit Awards	Best Original Score	Alejandro Amenábar	Nominated	
Goya Awards	Best Film	The Others	Won	
Goya Awards	Best Director	Alejandro Amenábar	Won	
Goya Awards	Best Actress	Nicole Kidman	Nominated	
Goya Awards	Best New Actor	James Bentley	Nominated	
Goya Awards	Best New Actress	Alakina Mann	Nominated	
Goya Awards	Best Cinematography	Javier Aguirresarobe	Won	
Goya Awards	Best Editing	Nacho Ruiz Capillas	Won	
Goya Awards	Best Art Direction	Benjamín Fernández	Won	
Goya Awards	Best Production Supervision	Emiliano Otegui; Miguel Ángel González	Won	
Goya Awards	Best Original Screenplay	Alejandro Amenábar	Won	
Goya Awards	Best Original Score	Alejandro Amenábar	Nominated	
Goya Awards	Best Sound	Ricardo Steinberg; Daniel Goldstein; Tim Cavagin; Alfonso Raposo	Won	
Goya Awards	Best Costume Design	Sonia Grande	Nominated	
Goya Awards	Best Makeup and Hairstyles	Ana López-Puigcerver; Belén López-Puigcerver	Nominated	
Goya Awards	Best Special Effects	Félix Bergés; Derek Langley; Pedro Moreno; Rafael Solórzano	Nominated	
Kansas City Film Critic Circle Awards	Best Actress	Nicole Kidman	Won	
London Film Critics' Circle	Actress of the Year	Nicole Kidman	Won	
Online Film Critics	Best Actress	Nicole Kidman	Nominated	
Online Film Critics	Best Original Screenplay	Alejandro Amenábar	Won (Note: Shared with Mulholland Drive)	
Satellite Awards	Best Actress	Nicole Kidman	Nominated	
Satellite Awards	Best Supporting Actress	Fionnula Flanagan	Nominated	
Satellite Awards	Best Original Screenplay	Alejandro Amenábar	Nominated	
Satellite Awards	Best Film	The Others	Nominated	
Satellite Awards	Best Sound	Ricardo Steinberg; Tim Caravign	Nominated	
Satellite Awards	Best Art Direction	Benjamín Fernández; Emilio Ardura; Elli Griff	Nominated	
Saturn Awards	Best Actress	Nicole Kidman	Won	
Saturn Awards	Best Supporting Actress	Fionnula Flanagan	Won	
Saturn Awards	Best Performance by a Younger Actor	Alakina Mann	Nominated	
Saturn Awards	Best Horror Film	The Others	Won	
Saturn Awards	Best Director	Alejandro Amenábar	Nominated	
Saturn Awards	Best Writing	Alejandro Amenábar	Nominated	
Venice Film Festival	Golden Lion Award	Alejandro Amenábar	Nominated	
Young Artist Awards	Best Supporting Young Actress	Alakina Mann	Nominated	
Young Artist Awards	Best Young Actor	James Bentley	Won	
Young Artist Awards	Best Family Feature Film – Drama	The Others	Nominated	

=== Home media ===
On 14 May 2002, Buena Vista Home Entertainment released a two-disc collector's edition DVD. On 20 September 2011, Lionsgate released the film on Blu-ray. In July 2023, The Criterion Collection announced a forthcoming 4K UHD Blu-ray edition of the film scheduled for release on 24 October 2023. StudioCanal concurrently announced distribution for a 4K UHD Blu-ray in Europe.

== Planned remake ==
In April 2020, Sentient Entertainment acquired the remake rights to The Others, with the company planning to revamp the film by setting it in the present day. Later that year, it was announced that Universal Pictures will co-produce and distribute the film with Sentient.

== See also ==
- List of ghost films
- List of Spanish films of 2001
- The Innocents – 1961 horror film directed by Jack Clayton
- The Turn of the Screw – 1898 gothic horror novella by Henry James
