= Mr. Topaze =

1961 British film by Peter Sellers

- British quad poster by Tom Chantrell
- Directed by: Peter Sellers
- Written by: Pierre Rouve; Johnny Speight (script associate)
- Based on: the play Topaze by Marcel Pagnol
- Produced by: Pierre Rouve
- Starring: Peter Sellers; Nadia Gray; Herbert Lom; Leo McKern
- Cinematography: John Wilcox
- Edited by: Geoffrey Foot
- Music by: George Martin; Georges Van Parys
- Production company: Dimitri De Grunwald Production
- Distributed by: Twentieth Century Fox
- Release date: 4 April 1961 (London)
- Running time: 97 minutes
- Country: United Kingdom
- Language: English

Mr. Topaze (U.S. title: I Like Money) is a 1961 British film directed by Peter Sellers and starring Sellers, Nadia Gray, Leo McKern, and Herbert Lom. It was Sellers' directorial debut. The screenplay was written by Pierre Rouve based on the 1928 playTopaze by Marcel Pagnol.

Out of distribution for many years, a print exists in the British Film Institute National Archive, which makes it available for viewing on their website. The film was shown during the 2003 Cardiff Independent Film Festival. It was released on Blu-ray and DVD on 15 April 2019 by the BFI.

== Plot ==
Mr. Topaze is an unassuming school teacher in an unassuming small French town who is honest to a fault. He is sacked when he refuses to give a passing grade to a bad student, the grandson of a wealthy Baroness. Castel Benac, a government official who runs a crooked financial business on the side, is persuaded by his mistress, Suzy, a musical comedy actress, to hire Mr. Topaze as the front man for his business. Gradually, Topaze becomes a rapacious financier who sacrifices his honesty for success and, in a final stroke of business bravado, fires Benac and acquires Suzy in the deal. An old friend and colleague, Tamise questions him and tells Topaze that what he now says and practices indicates there are no more honest men.

== Cast ==
- Peter Sellers as Albert Topaze
- Nadia Gray as Suzy
- Herbert Lom as Castel Benac
- Leo McKern as Muche
- Martita Hunt as Baroness
- Michael Gough as Tamise
- Anne Leon as Mrs. Tamise
- Billie Whitelaw as Ernestine
- Joan Sims as Colette
- John Neville as Roger
- John Le Mesurier as blackmailer
- Michael Sellers as Gaston

== Critical reception ==
The Monthly Film Bulletin wrote: "Peter Sellers has chosen, in the early scenes, to adopt the diffident, rueful manner and accent of Alec Guinness, while he leaves it to Leo McKern, all snorts and twitches, to present the lively caricature performance. With Michael Gough's sympathetic Tamise and Martita Hunt's battleship Baroness in support, these school episodes have a dawdling, easy-going humour. With the appearance of Suzy and Castel Benac, however, and the shift from atmosphere to plot, the film goes adrift. Sellers, as director, has neither the necessary control nor the ability to direct actors playing straight, as opposed to character, parts. He leaves Herbert Lom and Nadia Gray amateurishly at sea, he shows no stages of the transformation but simply invites us to accept the fact of Topaze's newly-discovered acumen, and he lets the sympathy seep out of his own characterisation without finding anything to put in its place. Don Ashton's art direction and some agreeable locations give Mr Topaze an elegant surface; but this is essentially a film of minor pleasures and major inadequacies."

In The New York Times, Bosley Crowther wrote, "for the most part, Mr. Sellers keeps himself too rigidly in hand – and the blame is his, because he is also the fellow who directed the film. He avoids the comic opportunities, takes the role too seriously," concluding that, "As a consequence, he's just a little boring – and that's death for a Sellers character."

Stanley Kauffmann of The New Republic wrote: "This new version of Pagnol's Topaze has a diluted script by Pierre Rouve that runs about an hour before the plotwheels begin to turn."

Leslie Halliwell said: "Predictable, sluggish, character comedy, with a good actor unable to make it as a star. Or as a director."

The Radio Times Guide to Films gave the film 2/5 stars, writing: "Peter Sellers directed himself in this adaptation of a Marcel Pagnol play, so he has only himself to blame. ... Beset by the likes of Herbert Lom, Leo McKern and Nadia Gray, Sellers makes an endearing innocent at large. Alas, his direction lacks the edge the idea needed."
