= Sonia Aquino =

Italian actress

- Born: 10 July 1977 (age 47); Avellino, Campania, Italy
- Occupation: Actress

Sonia Aquino (born 10 July 1977 in Avellino) is an Italian actress.

== Biography ==
A theatre, cinema and television actress, Aquino graduated from the National School of the Cinema (Scuola Nazionale di Cinema) in Rome and attended Francesca De Sapio's Duse Studio. She studied also performing arts at the theatre "Bellini" in Naples, taking part in some stages held by Peter Del Monte, Marco Bellocchio, and Maurizio Nichetti. She most notably appeared in the movie The Life and Death of Peter Sellers as Sophia Loren.

== Filmography ==
=== Cinema ===
- Marquise (1997)
- Il fratello minore (2000) – Role: Ragazza sexy
- Amici Ahrarara (2001) – Role: Maura
- L'italiano (2002) – Role: Luisa
- The Life and Death of Peter Sellers, by Stephen Hopkins (2004) – Role: Sophia Loren
- Signora (2004) – Role: Sarah
- Casa Eden (2004)
- Viva Franconi (2006)

=== Television ===
- Deserto di fuoco Mini-series TV (1997)
- Vivere – Role: Caterina
- Il bambino di Betlemme (2002) – TV film
- Imperium: Nerone Mini-series TV – Role: Messalina
- Il Cuore nel Pozzo Mini-series TV (2005) – Role: Giulia
- Carabinieri – TV series (2005–2008)
- Nati ieri – TV series (2006–2007)
- Un dottore quasi perfetto TV film – Role: Francesca Nocetti
- Incantesimo 9-10 Soap Opera – Role: Rossella Natoli
- Don Matteo 6, TV series – Role: Vanessa
- I Cesaroni 3 – TV series (2009)
- Sant'Agostino (2009)
- Storia di una famiglia per bene (2021) TV mini-series – Role: Angelica Straziota
