= The Prisoner of Zenda (1979 film) =

1979 film by Richard Quine

- Theatrical release poster
- Directed by: Richard Quine
- Screenplay by: Dick Clement; Ian La Frenais
- Based on: The Prisoner of Zenda 1894 novel by Edward E. Rice Anthony Hope; The Prisoner of Zenda 1896 play by Edward Rose
- Produced by: Walter Mirisch
- Starring: Peter Sellers; Lynne Frederick; Lionel Jeffries; Elke Sommer
- Cinematography: Arthur Ibbetson
- Music by: Henry Mancini
- Production company: The Mirisch Corporation
- Distributed by: Universal Pictures
- Release date: May 25, 1979 (United States)
- Running time: 108 minutes
- Country: United States
- Language: English
- Budget: $10 million
- Box office: $7.65 million (US/Canada rentals)

The Prisoner of Zenda is a 1979 American comedy film directed by Richard Quine that stars Peter Sellers, Lynne Frederick, Lionel Jeffries, Elke Sommer, Gregory Sierra, Jeremy Kemp, and Catherine Schell. It is adapted from the 1894 adventure novel by Anthony Hope. The novel tells the story of a man (Peter Sellers) who has to impersonate a king, whom he closely resembles, when the king is abducted by enemies on the eve of his coronation.

The comedy was loosely adapted by Dick Clement and Ian La Frenais. It has echoes of Hope's book and several other well-known novels, especially Dumas's The Man in the Iron Mask. Sellers plays three roles: that of the Ruritanian King Rudolph V and the London cab driver Sydney Frewin who is brought in to portray the missing King with whom he shares an uncanny resemblance. Sellers also portrayed the aged King Rudoph IV at the start of the film, before he is killed in a hot air balloon accident.

It was also Quine's final film as a director and John Laurie’s final film performance before his death.

== Plot ==
King Rudolf IV of Ruritania dies in a balloon accident upon the celebration of his eightieth birthday. In order to secure the throne, General Sapt and his nephew Fritz travel to London, where the King's son, Rudolf V, lives through the day in London's pleasure establishments; but the King's demented half-brother Michael, thinking that he is the better claimant, sends an assassin after them. Hansom cab driver Sydney (or Sidney) Frewin, the new King's half-brother from an affair with a British actress, rescues Rudolf from an assassination attempt. Once his resemblance to the King is noticed, Frewin is hired by the general, ostensibly as the King's coachman but actually to play the role of a decoy. The ruse is quickly uncovered, however, when during an attack by Michael's men the royal guardsmen address Frewin as their new king, and the two look-alikes get acquainted.

In an unattended moment, Rudolf is captured and brought to Michael's castle of Zenda. Out of necessity, Frewin has to keep masquerading as the King for the coronation ceremony. Princess Flavia, Rudolf's fiancée, is perceptive enough to see through the ruse, and after Frewin and the general have confided in her, she quickly becomes Frewin's trusted ally and love interest. Complicating the scheme on Frewin's side is the jealous Count Montparnasse whose wife has become infatuated with Rudolf, and on Michael's side, his mistress Antoinette, who is wildly jealous about the prospect of Michael marrying Flavia and in turn is the romantic interest of the slightly unbalanced Rupert von Henzau, Michael's second-in-command.

After several failed assassination attempts, Michael attempts to lure Frewin into a trap. While the trap fails, Frewin, posing as Henzau's coach driver, is recognized and captured upon arrival in Zenda. Frewin and Rudolf escape with Antoinette's help, and when Sapt and his men arrive at the castle, Henzau switches sides and aids Frewin and Rudolf against Michael, opens the castle gates and rides away, telling Sapt that he will report for duty next week. Michael and his men attempt to capture Rudolf and Frewin, but they jump off the battlements into the moat, and Sapt has Michael arrested for treason. Assuming Frewin's identity, Rudolf pursues his interests in the countess and the London gambling tables, while Frewin marries Princess Flavia and becomes king of Ruritania.

== Cast ==
- Peter Sellers as Rudolf IV / Rudolf V / Sydney Frewin
- Lionel Jeffries as General Sapt
- Lynne Frederick as Princess Flavia
- Elke Sommer as Nathalie, Countess Montparnasse
- Gregory Sierra as Gilles, Count Montparnasse
- Simon Williams as Fritz
- Jeremy Kemp as Prince Michael
- Catherine Schell as Antoinette
- Stuart Wilson as Rupert of Hentzau
- John Laurie as Archbishop
- Graham Stark as Erik

== Production ==
Walter Mirisch pitched the film to Sellers while the latter was making Murder by Death. Sellers liked the idea but not the script and requested a new one be written by Dick Clement and Ian La Frenais.

The film was announced in December 1976. and was shot in Austria. Schönbrunn Palace in Vienna represented the "Ruritania" royal palace; other filming locations included Burg Kreuzenstein, St. Martin's Church in Klosterneuburg and Salzburg Cathedral.

The film's production was frequently tense. Sellers' qualms about the production and struggles with his declining health led to several angry confrontations with his wife and co-star, Lynne Frederick, as well as the film's director, Richard Quine.

When Sellers saw a preview of the film, he objected strenuously, claiming Mirisch had arranged for new footage to be shot without him or Quine, turning it into "a Pink Panther movie".

== Critical reception ==
Time Out called it "A limp and shoddy farce in which neither Sellers' lifeless double-role mugging, nor a dire fish-out-of-water script by Dick Clement and Ian La Frenais, encourage anything more than a deepening nostalgia for the straightfaced swashbuckling of previous adaptations"; whereas in The New York Times, Janet Maslin wrote "Mr. Sellers is onscreen with himself surprisingly often, and the effect never looks trumped-up. He performs a perfect balancing act, orchestrated so well that the funny character makes the serious one even more effective, and vice versa. 'The Prisoner of Zenda' doesn't have the kind of finesse that Blake Edwards's direction has given the 'Pink Panther' series. But the slack moments are painless enough, and they come as a fair exchange for the pleasure of Mr. Seller's [sic] artfully schhizoid [sic] company."

Todd McCarthy of Variety called the film "a tame comic vehicle for another exercise in multiple role-playing by Peter Sellers ... More than anything, pic resembles some of Danny Kaye's comic romps of decades past, such as 'The Court Jester,' but with a lot fewer laughs." Gene Siskel of the Chicago Tribune gave the film 2 stars out of 4 and wrote, "Everything about the Peter Sellers comedy 'Prisoner of Zenda' seems tired. Its jokes are tired, its story situations are tired, its pacing is tired, and Sellers' dual performance seems doubly lackluster." Kevin Thomas of the Los Angeles Times called the film an "unhappy spectacle of a capable cast, bedecked with turn-of-the-century finery and placed amid settings of historic Austrian splendor, straining and straining to get laughs out of solid lead (Even Henry Mancini's score seems desperately jaunty.) The ultimate effect of the film is one of a feeling of embarrassment for all involved in its perpetration."

Gary Arnold of The Washington Post wrote "Offhand, I can't recall another comedy with an energy level as disastrously low as the one retarding 'The Prisoner of Zenda.' Although the finale generates a little slapstick turbulence, the movie looks and feels inert for the longest time. It's difficult to decide where to place the blame." Brendan Gill of The New Yorker wrote "There are occasions when Mr. Sellers is among the funniest men in the world, but this is not one of them."

David Ansen of Newsweek wrote "Though the budget supposedly reached $10 million, the film has the slapdash, impersonal feeling of those old studio features that were thrown together as star vehicles and rushed out against a strict deadline. But Sellers needs strong collaborators and a sturdy context. He may be our greatest comic actor but, unlike comedians who carry a film on the force of their immediately recognizable personality, Sellers's strong suit is his chameleonlike virtuosity, and chameleons are meaningless without a backdrop." Paul Taylor of The Monthly Film Bulletin called it a "flatly directed, leadenly unfunny farce."
