= A Long Return =

- Original theatrical release poster
- Directed by: Pedro Lazaga
- Written by: Juan Cobos; Miguel Rubio
- Produced by: Manuel Perez
- Starring: Mark Burns; Lynne Frederick; Charo López; Ricardo Merino
- Cinematography: Francisco Sempere
- Edited by: Alfonso Santacana
- Music by: Antón García Abril
- Release date: 26 May 1975
- Running time: 116 min
- Country: Spain
- Language: English

A Long Return, also known by the title Largo Retorno in Spain, is a 1975 Spanish romantic film, directed by Pedro Lazaga with music by Antón García Abril. It is based on a novel by author and playwright Germán Ubillos.

== Plot ==
A vibrant young college student, Anna (Lynne Frederick), catches eye of architect, David Ortega (Mark Burns), at an orchestra show. She quickly falls in love with him and begins to pursue him. Although David is initially hesitant, she eventually wins his love. The two become inseparable and eventually get married.

Soon after their Venice honeymoon, Anna begins acting strangely; experiencing sudden fatigue, grogginess, and memory loss (even forgetting her best friend). Eventually Anna is hospitalized and doctors diagnose her condition as lipomatosis of the nervous system, a rare and deadly disease that is quickly killing her. While in the hospital, with her husband by her bed side, Anna suddenly has a seizure and renders her in a state of a coma. Doctors tell David that his wife has less than days to live, and he desperately pleads with them for help of any kind. They inform him that Anna's only chance of survival is to put her in a state of perpetual deep cryogenic sedation, which would shut down her body (stopping the disease from spreading), freeze her in time, and prevent her from aging, until a cure can be found, in which event she would be revived. With great optimism, David accepts and Anna is put in a state of cryogenic sedation.

For the next forty years, David remains faithful to Anna and waits for a cure to be found. Meanwhile, Anna's friends and family move on with their lives, even as going as far as wanting to pull the plug on her and bury her, as she remains sedated. A cure is finally found in 2014, and she is successfully revived. When Anna awakens she is kept at the hospital for observations. She repeatedly asks to see her husband, not knowing he is now middle aged and that she has been in sedation for the last forty years. The doctor denies her request.

The ice is broken when her best friend, Irene (now well past her 60s), visits her and informs her of what has happened in the last forty years (such events like Anna's parents dying and the inevitable changes David has succumb to with age). When she is released from the hospital, Irene takes her to David, and much to his delight, Anna greets him with overflowing love and affection. Later that night David expresses his trepidation and guilt of the age difference in their relationship. Anna assures David that her love for him is still there, and that it is stronger than ever for him remaining faithful to her.

The couple has only a short time together as David dies (possibly of heart failure or old age) a few days later. After David's death, Anna's doctor comes by the house, asking the grief-stricken widow, where she will go from here. She replies, in a sorrowful manner, “Go on living.” Anna then has a flash back to her first date with David when he gave Anna her motto (“Today is the first day of the rest of your life”). She then tearfully glances at the doctor and utters to him “Today is the first day of the rest of my life,” knowing David would want her to go on living her life.

== Cast ==
- Mark Burns ... David Ortega
- Lynne Frederick ... Anna Ortega
- Charo López ... Irene
- Ricardo Merino ... Carlos
- George Rigaud ... Doctor Valls
- Andrés Mejuto ... Father of Anna
- Mayrata O'Wiesiedo ... Mother of Anna
- Adriano Domínguez ... Martin
- Cocha Cuetos ... Adela
- Juan Diego ... Docteur Aguirre
- Fernando Hilbeck ... Doctor Armayor

== Production ==
Lynne Frederick got the part of Anna largely because she had the ability to cry out of either eye on cue. Due to the production's low budget, many of the outfits that Frederick wore in the film were from her own personal wardrobe. She recycled some of these outfits a year later when she starred in the film Schizo (1976).

Alibe Parsons dubbed Frederick’s singing voice for the English soundtrack. The songs on the Spanish soundtrack were performed by vocalist, Mariví Navarrete. The film's score never had an official soundtrack release and, like the movie, remains obscure.

The film was shot in Madrid, Segovia, Venice and Mallorca, in 1975.

== Release ==
A Long Return was released in Spain on 26 May 1975. In Italy it was released under the title "A Venezia muore un'estate". One alternate English title it was released under was "A Long Returning".

=== Home video ===
The film was only available in the early '80s on PAL Betamax and VHS. It was released in English, Spanish, Italian, and English with Greek subtitles. The film was never available in the US on DVD or VHS. Today the film is out of print and physical copies are near impossible to find anywhere.

== Critical reception ==
Upon release the film received mixed to favorable reviews from critics, who praised Burns's and Frederick's performances but questioned some of the science and medical fiction elements.
