= Death Is a Woman =

1966 British film by Frederic Goode

- Theatrical release poster
- Directed by: Frederic Goode
- Screenplay by: Wally Bosco
- Story by: Wally Bosco (original story)
- Produced by: Harry Field
- Starring: Mark Burns; Shaun Curry; William Dexter; Wanda Ventham; Terence De Marney; Patsy Ann Noble
- Cinematography: Bill Jordan
- Edited by: Fredrick Ives
- Music by: John Shakespeare
- Production company: Associated British-Pathé
- Distributed by: Warner Pathé Distributors
- Release date: February 1966 (United Kingdom)
- Running time: 84 minutes
- Country: United Kingdom
- Language: English

Death Is a Woman (also known as Sex Is a Woman, CIA an Malta: Diese Frau ist gefährlich, Love Is a Woman) is a 1966 British mystery film directed by Frederic Goode and starring Mark Burns, Shaun Curry, William Dexter, Wanda Ventham, Terence De Marney and Patsy Ann Noble. It was written by Wally Bosco.

== Plot ==
British undercover agent Dennis Parbury is sent to an island in the Mediterranean to identify how a heroin-smuggling operation is distributing their product.

== Cast ==
- Mark Burns as Dennis Parbury
- Shaun Curry as Joe
- William Dexter as Malo
- Wanda Ventham as Priscilla Blunstone-Smythe
- Terence De Marney as Jacomini
- Patsy Ann Noble as Francesca
- Mark Singleton as Costello, Head of the Police
- Michael Brennan as Bonelli
- Anita Harris as singer at casino
- Blake Butler as lift operator
- Dulcie Bowman as old lady
- Tony Watham as himself
- Garth Adams as himself
- Caron Gardner as Mary

== Production ==
Filming took place in Malta and in the Pathe Studios of London.

== Reception ==
The Monthly Film Bulletin wrote: "Drug traffic, gambling, murder mystery, unscrupulous femme fatale, and a couple of songs, here brought together against a colourful Mediterranean background. But the mixture fails to coalesce, and the naiveté of the script is only emphasised by some distinctly substandard acting. Still, there are several underwater sequences for those who like to watch them."

Kine Weekly wrote: "Mysterious without ever being very exciting, this is a rather muddled story lacking any distinction. Mediocre support. ... The story starts quite promisingly with a man being beaten up and then brutally shot, but interest and excitement is then dissipated in too many directions, some of the characters being introduced for no apparent reason and other events being left unexplained. Nor does the practically unknown cast manage to do much with the material provided."

== Songs ==
- "Who's Foolish", music and lyrics by Joan Shakespeare, sung by Anita Harris
- "Francesca", music and lyrics by Joan Shakespeare, sung by Dennis Lotis (as Denis Lotis)
