= Trisha Noble =

Australian singer, actress (1944–2021)

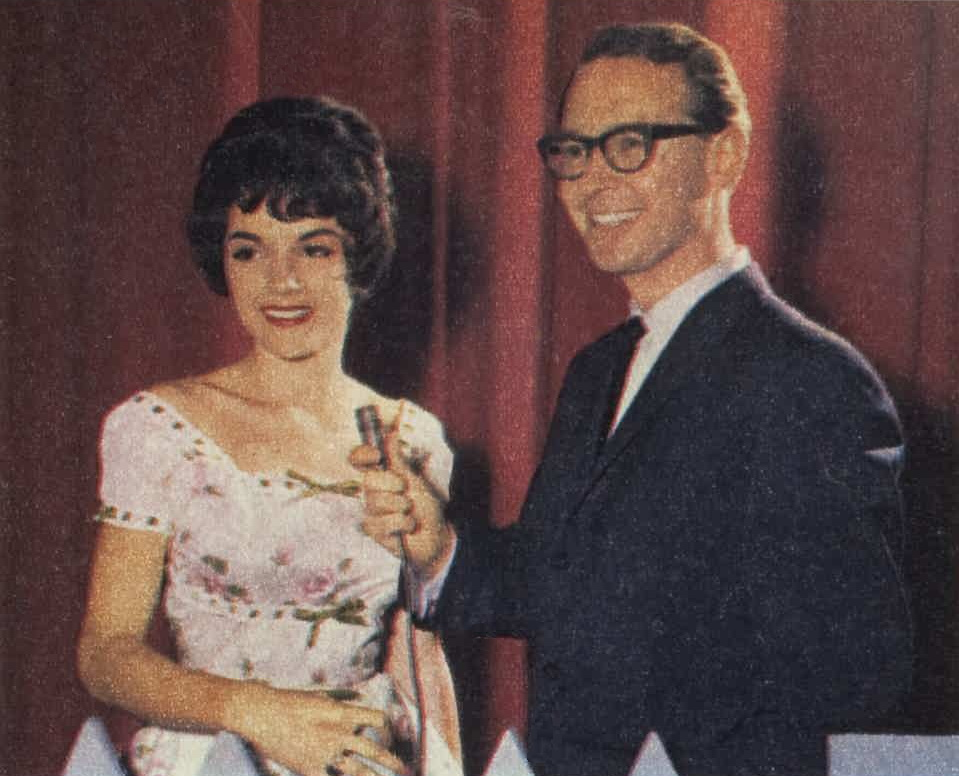
- Noble (as Patsy Ann Noble) and host Brian Henderson on Bandstand (1960)
- Born: Patricia Ann Ruth Noble; 3 February 1944; Marrickville, New South Wales, Australia
- Died: 23 January 2021 (aged 76)
- Other name: Patsy Ann Noble
- Occupations: Singer, actress
- Years active: 1950–2007
- Spouses: Alan Sharpe (m. 1967; div. 1974) Scott MacKenzie (m. 1976; div. 1980) Peter Field (m. 1985, divorced)
- Children: 1

Patricia Ann Ruth Noble (3 February 1944 – 23 January 2021) was an Australian singer and actress. Initially performing as Patsy Ann Noble, she was a teenage pop singer in the early 1960s, with regular appearances on the Australian music and variety television series Bandstand. In November 1961, she released her biggest hit single, "Good Looking Boy", which reached the Top 10 in Melbourne and Top 20 in Sydney. At the 1961 Logie Awards, she won the Best Female Singer of the Year award from TV Week. By 1962, she had transferred to the United Kingdom and continued her singing career by releasing singles there.

In 1965, Noble started her television acting career, and by 1967, she was using Trisha Noble as her stage name. By the 1970s, she had relocated to the United States and had guest roles on various television series including The Mary Tyler Moore Show, Columbo, Baretta, McMillan & Wife, The Rockford Files, and Buck Rogers in the 25th Century.

== Early life and family ==
Patricia "Trisha" Ann Ruth Noble was born on 3 February 1944 in Marrickville and grew up in Sydney, Australia. Her father was Clarence Lancelot "Buster" Noble (1 March 1913 – 15 July 1990), a comedian and singer; her mother was Helen De Paul (born Helen McGoulrick, 1921–2007), an entertainer, singer, dancer, and comedian on the Tivoli circuit. During World War II, Buster served as a sergeant in the Waratahs Entertainment Unit in the AIF from November 1942 to January 1946. Noble has a younger sister, Amanda. In 1950, Noble appeared onstage with her parents and had her own radio programme. By age 14, she was qualified to teach ballet.

== Music career ==
Noble rose to fame as a teenage singing star in the 1960s under the name Patsy Ann Noble. Her singing career was encouraged by Brian Henderson, the compere of the Australian version of Bandstand, where she made regular appearances. She was signed to the His Master's Voice label and released her first single "Like I'm in Love" / "I Love You So Much It Hurts" in November 1960. She became good friends with a young Peter Allen, who had formed the successful Allen Brothers with Chris Bell, and released one of his compositions "Busy Lips" in January 1961. However, it was not until Johnny Devlin, a New Zealand singer-songwriter, handed her the lyrics of "Good Looking Boy" in November 1961 that she had her first Top 10 hit in Melbourne. "Good Looking Boy" was also top 20 in Sydney, but did not chart internationally. It was released in the United Kingdom, but did not reach the Top 100.

Noble won the 'Best Female Singer of the Year' Logie Award for 1961, presented by TV Week. By December 1962, Patsy Ann had scored herself two No. 1 and four Top 10 singles in Australia. In 1962, she travelled to London where she was given a two-year contract with Columbia Records. There, she released many "girl group"-sounding pop songs including "Sour Grapes" (February 1963), "I'm Nobody's Baby" (1963), and "Accidents Will Happen" (1963), but received little commercial success – although she continued to score hits between 1963 and 1965 in Australia. In 1963, she appeared in the British musical film Live It Up! (with music produced by Joe Meek), although only in a singing role. In June 1965, Noble released "He Who Rides a Tiger" which peaked at No. 21 on the British Top 30, and No. 15 on Australia's Top 40.

During the 1960s, Noble released six albums in Australia and one in England, the most popular being The Blonde Bombshell (1961) which received an award for most outstanding vocal performance on an album.

== Acting career ==
In the second half of the 1960s, she turned to acting and made her dramatic screen debut in a 1965 BBC television production entitled The Snowball, and soon found herself appearing on other television and film series, including the 1966 Danger Man episode "Not So Jolly Roger" (in which her recording "He Who Rides a Tiger" was featured), Callan (1970, "The Same Trick Twice") with Edward Woodward, and films such as Death Is a Woman (1966), in which Noble had a lead role as the femme fatale), and Carry On Camping (1969), which included a famous “keep fit” scene with Dame Barbara Windsor and others and an amorous encounter with Terry Scott.

After 1967, Noble had changed her name to Trisha Noble in order to distance herself from her years as a teen singer. She relocated to the United States beginning in 1971 and appeared in films and television series. She guest-starred on Buck Rogers in the 25th Century as Sabrina, a superhuman thief in the episode "Cruise Ship to the Stars". In a guest appearance on The Mary Tyler Moore Show in 1976, she played a female reporter who tries to seduce Ted Baxter (Ted Knight) during the episode "Ted's Temptation". She also appeared in Up Pompeii! (series 1) as high priestess of the Vestal Virgins.

In 1975, Noble appeared in the Columbo episode "Playback", in which she meets the murderer (played by Oskar Werner) in an art gallery wearing a low-cut dress. She was cast by the director who had spotted her in a party wearing the same dress. In 1976–77, she had the ongoing role of Yvonne Holland on the soap opera Executive Suite, and appeared in the 1977 television miniseries The Rhinemann Exchange and Testimony of Two Men. In 1979, she featured on The Rockford Files as Odette Lependieu in the two-part episode "Never Send a Boy King To Do a Man's Job".

In 1980, Noble played the role of heiress Phyllis Morley in the mystery comedy film The Private Eyes starring Tim Conway and Don Knotts. Another ongoing role was as Detective Rosie Johnson on the police drama Strike Force (starring Robert Stack) on ABC in 1981–82. She also appeared in Season 4 of Hart to Hart as Laela.

Soon after Strike Force was cancelled, Noble returned to Australia in 1983 with her son Patrick because her father, Buster, was seriously ill. She re-established a career there as a theatrical actress. In 1986, she appeared in the television miniseries Body Business. In 2002, Noble filmed a small role as Padmé Amidala's mother Jobal Naberrie, in Star Wars: Episode II – Attack of the Clones which was cut from the final film – but included on the DVD release. In 2003 Trisha Noble played the role of Ellie Greenwich's "Ma" to critical acclaim in "Leader of the Pack" at The Star in Sydney, showcasing both her comic onstage genius as well as her vocal range, never failing to bring the audience to tears with her stunning rendition of "Look of Love". She continued to perform on the live stage and, as of 2007, appeared with the new National Music Theatre Company, Kookaburra, in their premiere season of Pippin as Berthe at the Sydney Theatre.

== Death ==
Noble died on 23 January 2021 at the age of 76, days before her 77th birthday, after what was described as an 18-month battle with mesothelioma. Her remains were cremated.

== Filmography ==
=== Film ===
- denotes credited as Patsy Ann Noble

Year	Title	Role	Notes
1963	Live It Up!	Herself	Musical film
1964	Reels Within Reels	Herself	Short film
1964	A Dream Singing	Performer	TV movie
1966	Funny Girl Happened to Me on the Way to the Piano	Herself	TV movie
1966	Death Is a Woman	Francesca	Feature film
1968	Iolanthe	Iolanthe	TV movie
1969	Carry On Camping	Sally	Feature film
1975	One of Our Own	Sabrina Rogoff	TV movie
1978	The Courage and the Passion	Lt. Lisa Rydell	TV movie
1979	The Wild Wild West Revisited	Penelope	TV movie
1980	Willow B: Women In Prison	Chris Bricker	TV movie
1980	The Private Eyes	Mistress Phyllis Morley	Feature film
1981	..Deadline...	Gillian Boles	TV movie
2002	Star Wars: Episode II – Attack of the Clones	Jobal Naberrie (uncredited)	Feature film
2005	Star Wars: Episode III – Revenge of the Sith	Jobal Nabarrie	Feature film

=== Television ===
- denotes credited as Patsy Ann Noble

Year	Title	Role	Notes
1959	The Bobby Limb Show	Guest Singer	TV series, 1 episode
1960	The Golden Rock	Herself - Singer	TV special
1961	Revue '61	Herself	1 episode
1961–1962, 1965, 1967	Bandstand	Herself - Singer	TV series
1963	The Arthur Haynes Show	Herself - Singer	1 episode
1963	Pops and Lenny	Herself	1 episode
1963	Ready, Steady, Go!	Herself	1 episode
1963–1964	Discs a Go-Go	Herself	5 episodes
1963	Val Parnell's Sunday Night At The London Palladium	Herself	1 episode
1963–1966	Thank Your Lucky Stars	Guest host	9 episodes
1964	Hi There! It's Rolf Harris	Herself	1 episode
1964	Big Night Out	Herself	1 episode
1964	Two of a Kind	Herself	1 episode
1964	The Andy Stewart Show	Herself	1 episode
1964	Blackpool Night Out	Herself	1 episode
1964	Club Night	Herself	1 episode
1964	The Eamonn Andrews Show	Herself	1 episode
1964, 1965	Comedy Bandbox	Herself	2 episodes
1965	With Andy	Herself	1 episode
1965	Ni figue ni raisin	Herself	2 episodes
1965, 1966	Five O'Clock Club	Herself	2 episode
1966	Juke Box Jury	Panellist	2 episode
1966	The Benny Hill Show	Guest performer	1 episode
1966	Danger Man	Susan Wade	1 episode
1966	The Wednesday Play	Francoise Clouet	1 episode
1967	The Blackpool Show	Herself	1 episode
1967	The Charlie Drake Show	Herself	1 episode
1967	The Nixon Line	Herself	1 episode
1967, 1968	The Dick Emery Show	Herself	2 episodes
1967	Mickey Dunne	Janie Jenkins	1 episode
1968	International Cabaret	Herself	1 episode
1968	BBC Show of the Week	Herself	1 episode
1968	We Have Ways of Making You Laugh	Various	TV series
1969	Out of the Unknown	Gladia	1 episode
1969	The Liberace Show	Herself	1 episode
1969	The Dave King Show	Herself	1 episode
1969	Who-Dun-It	Dolores Vail	1 episode
1969	The Engelbert Humperdinck Show	Herself	1 episode
1969	Z-Cars	Betty Jordan	2 episodes
1970	It's Tommy Cooper	Herself	1 episode
1970	Callan	Jean Price	1 episode
1970	Fraud Squad	Liz Paterson	1 episode
1970	Crowther's Back In Town	Herself	1 episode
1970	Up Pompeii!	Luscia / High Priestess of the Vestal Virgins	2 episodes
1970	The Benny Hill Show	Various roles	1 episode
1971	The Merv Griffin Show	Herself	1 episode
1971	Night Gallery	Sherry	1 episode
1972	I'm a Fan	Herself	TV special
1972	The Courtship of Eddie's Father	Dr. Liz Park	1 episode
1975	Baretta New Girl in Town	Girl	1 episode
1975	Columbo Playback	Marcy Hubbard	1 episode
1975	The Bob Crane Show	Student	1 episode
1975	Matt Helm	Millicent	1 episode
1976	The Mary Tyler Moore Show	Whitney Lewis	1 episode
1976–1977	Executive Suite	Yvonne Holland	7 episodes
1977	The Rhinemann Exchange	Irene	Miniseries, 1 episode
1977	McMillan & Wife	Beulah Harrington	1 episode
1977	Testimony of Two Men	Edna Beamish	Miniseries, 3 episodes
1978	James at 15	Call girl	1 episode
1978	How the West Was Won	Valerie	3 episodes
1978	Husbands, Wives & Lovers	Carol	1 episode
1978	Fantasy Island	Denise Carlson	1 episode
1978; 1984	The Mike Walsh Show	Guest – Herself via satellite US	TV series, 1 episode
1979	The Rockford Files	Odette Lependieu	2 episodes
1979	Mrs. Columbo	Patty	1 episode
1979	Eischied	Jeanne	1 episode
1979	Buck Rogers in the 25th Century	Sabrina	1 episode
1980	Stone	Lynette	1 episode
1980	John Newcombe's Australian Stars In The States	Herself at home	TV special
1981	Flamingo Road	Vanessa Curtis	1 episode
1981	The Love Boat	Gertrude Turner	1 episode
1981–82	Strike Force	Sergeant Rosie Johnson	20 episodes
1982	Hart to Hart	Laela	1 episode
1983	Casablanca	Celia	1 episode
1983	T. J. Hooker	Lorraine Daggett	1 episode
1983	Oh Madeline	Julie	1 episode
1983	Matt Houston	Melinda	1 episode
1984; 1985	The Mike Walsh Show	Guest – Herself	TV series, 1 episode
1985	The Mike Walsh Show	Guest – Herself with Carmen Duncan	TV series, 1 episode
1986	Body Business	Elizabeth	Miniseries, 2 episodes
1992	Tonight Live with Steve Vizard	Guest	1 episode
1996	The South Bank Show	Herself	1 episode
2000, 2004	All Saints	Sister O'Reilly, Mrs. Summers	2 episodes
2000	Water Rats	Mrs. Clarke	1 episode
2001	Blonde	Dr. Mittelstadt	Miniseries
2001	This Is Your Life	Herself	1 episode: Trisha Noble
2002	Burke's Backyard	Herself – Celebrity Gardener	1 episode
2002	Star Wars: Episode II – Attack of the Clones: Deleted Scenes	Jobal Nabarrie	Video
2003; 2005	Good Morning Australia	Herself	1 episode
2005	Good Morning Australia	Herself	TV series, 1 episode
2017	The Daily Edition	Herself	1 episode

== Discography ==
Note that all recordings are credited to Patsy Ann Noble, the name she used from start of her singing career.

=== Albums ===
- Just for You (1962)
- Hits and Rarities – The Story of Patsy Ann Noble (1997)

=== EP ===
Il Est Là Le Garçon
Label: Columbia – ESRF 1506, Présence Mondiale – ESRF 1506
Format: Vinyl, 7-inch EP
Country: France
Released: 1964
Tracklist

- A1 Il Est Là Le Garçon (Heartbreak Avenue)
- A2 Tout Ce Que Je Souhaite (Accidents Will Happen)
- B1 C'est Drôle Les Rêves (The Proud Boy)
- B2 Ça Pourrait Changer (Don't You Ever Change Your Mind)

=== Singles ===
- "Like I’m in Love" (Walker & Lynn)/"I Love You So Much It Hurts" (Tillman). Recorded with orchestra under direction of Bob Young. Sydney, November 1960.
- "Busy Lips" (Peter Allen, Chris Bell of The Allen Brothers). Recorded with The Delltones and orchestra directed by Bob Young. Sydney, January 1961.
- "It's Always the Way" (Johnny Devlin)
- "A Guy Who Can Mend a Broken Heart" (Lucky Starr)
- "Good Looking Boy" (Johnny Devlin) 24 November 1961
- "I’m Not Supposed to Know" (Johnny Ashcroft, Lorna Barry, Noel Balfour). Recorded with orchestra directed by Geoff Harvey. Sydney, 1962
- "Oh, My Little Baby Darling (I Love You)" (Joe Halford, Jay Justin)
- "Don’t Love and Run" (Chet Clark)
- "I’ll Be Thinking of You" (Lorna Barry, Noel Balfour)
- "Once in a Lifetime" (Johnny Devlin)
- "When You Find Your True Love" (Joe Halford, Ray Swinfield)
- "Johnny One Note" (Rodgers and Hart). Recorded with accompaniments arranged & conducted by Geoff Harvey. Sydney, 1962
- "Moon River" (Henry Mancini)
- "I'm Beginning to See the Light" (James, Ellington, Hodges, George)
- "I Fall to Pieces" (Hank Cochran, Harlan Howard)
- "Over the Rainbow" (Harold Arlen)
- "Mama" (Cesare Andrea Bixio, Bruno Cherubini, Harold Barlow, Phil Brito)
- "Put on a Happy Face" (Strouse, Adams)
- "Johnny Sings a Love Song" (Joe Halford, Geoff Harvey)
- "Hey, Look Me Over" (Leigh, Coleman)
- "It Might as Well Be Spring" (Rodgers, Hammerstein)
- "Misty" (Erroll Garner, Johnny Burke)
- "Don’t You Ever Change Your Mind" (Bob Barrett). Recorded with Martin Slavin & His Orchestra. London, February 1963
- "Heartbreak Avenue" (Barratt, Dutch) April 1963
- "Sour Grapes" (Batchelor, Roberts)
- "I’m Nobody's Baby" – Columbia DB7008, DO4364. Recorded with Martin Slavin & His Orchestra. London, 1963
- "Accidents Will Happen" – Columbia DB7088. b/w He Tells Me With His Eyes
- "I Did Nothing Wrong" – Columbia DB7258, DO4475. Recorded with orchestra arranged and conducted by Ivor Raymonde. London, 1963
- "I Was Only Foolin' Myself" (Bob Barratt). Recorded with orchestra arranged and conducted by Martin Slavin. London, 1963
- "Ordinary Love" (Slavin-Gail-Rose). Recorded with orchestra arranged and conducted by Norrie Paramor. London, 1963
- "It's Better to Cry Today"
- "Don’t Tell Him I Told You"
- "He Who Rides A Tiger" – Polydor BM 56054, side A, mono, 7-inch 45 rpm vinyl. (music by Trevor Peacock / words by Gordon Waine) Musical director Peter Jeffries. England, June 1965. Coupled with "City of Night", it peaked at No. 21 on the British Top 30, and No. 15 on Australia's Top 40. The song was used prominently in the 1960's UK television series Danger Man (known as Secret Agent in the U.S.) starring Patrick McGoohan, in the third season finale episode "Not So Jolly Roger", first aired on 7 April 1966. Noble also acted in that episode, as Susie Wade, disc jockey at a pirate radio station located on an abandoned WWII Maunsell Fort (offshore gunnery platform) named Red Sands Fort, the real-life location of pirate radio station Radio 390 from 1965 to 1967.
- "City of Night" – Polydor BM 56054, side B, mono, 7-inch 45 rpm vinyl. (music by Peter Jeffries / words by Gordon Waine) Musical director Peter Jeffries. England, June 1965. Coupled with "He Who Rides A Tiger".
- "Live for life" (as Trisha Noble)
