= The Life and Death of Peter Sellers =

2004 film by Stephen Hopkins

- Film poster
- Directed by: Stephen Hopkins
- Screenplay by: Christopher Markus; Stephen McFeely
- Based on: The Life and Death of Peter Sellers by Roger Lewis
- Produced by: Simon Bosanquet
- Starring: Geoffrey Rush; Charlize Theron; Emily Watson; John Lithgow; Miriam Margolyes; Peter Vaughan; Sonia Aquino; Stanley Tucci; Stephen Fry
- Cinematography: Peter Levy
- Edited by: John Smith
- Music by: Richard Hartley
- Production companies: HBO Films; BBC Films; DeMann Entertainment; Company Pictures
- Distributed by: DreamWorks Pictures and HBO (United States); Icon Film Distribution (United Kingdom)
- Release date: May 21, 2004
- Running time: 121 minutes
- Countries: United Kingdom; United States
- Language: English
- Box office: $1.7 million

The Life and Death of Peter Sellers is a 2004 biographical film about the life of British comedian Peter Sellers, based on Roger Lewis's book of the same name. It was directed by Stephen Hopkins and stars Geoffrey Rush as Sellers, Miriam Margolyes as his mother Peg Sellers, Emily Watson as his first wife Anne Howe, Charlize Theron as his second wife Britt Ekland, John Lithgow as Blake Edwards, Stephen Fry as Maurice Woodruff and Stanley Tucci as Stanley Kubrick.

The film won the Golden Globe Award for Best Miniseries or Television Film and Rush won Best Actor – Miniseries or Television Film. It also won nine Primetime Emmy Awards, including Outstanding Lead Actor in a Miniseries or Movie for Rush.

== Plot ==
The film opens with Peter Sellers walking to a director's chair. An unseen live audience applauds as Sellers directs his gaze toward the film of his life.

In 1950s London, Peter Sellers achieves success on The Goon Show but fails to branch out into film. He returns home to his family after a failed audition but is urged by his controlling mother Peg to "bite the hand that feeds you". A now-inspired Sellers uses his talent for impersonation to become the elderly World War I veteran character he auditioned for. Once the casting agent, who rejected him earlier, has said that he is perfect for the role, Sellers reveals himself and is reluctantly given the part.

Sellers wins a British Academy Award for I'm All Right Jack. Peg and Sellers' father, Bill, watch their son's acceptance speech but are dismissed by Peg, a dejected Bill walks away leading to the first transformation of the film; Sellers is now playing his father, and with a heavy Yorkshire accent breaks the fourth wall to relate Peter's childhood.

Before the shooting of The Millionairess has begun, Sellers is already besotted with his co-star Sophia Loren, while his marriage to wife Anne is becoming strained and his children are subjected to their father's rages and subsequent extravagant gifts as compensation. When Loren mentions that Sellers is too far away in the countryside to take her home, he takes this as a cue to buy a house in the heart of London. To subdue some of the guilt Sellers feels about his feelings for Loren, he hires a decorator, Ted Levy, and insists that his wife and Levy should have drinks together. Sellers leaves them and goes to have dinner alone with Loren, who is surprised that Sellers' wife is not joining them and slowly realises that this is a date. She rejects Sellers' advances and tells him to go home to his family.

Seeing Carlo Ponti has come to visit his wife Loren on set, Sellers distracts himself with Loren's stand-in, and the two have sex in Sellers' Rolls-Royce. Meanwhile, Anne surrenders to quietly spending the night with Levy. Once Sellers returns home and realises his wife has left, he wreaks havoc in the house. Anne comes home the morning after to find Sellers on the balcony threatening to jump if she leaves. The two argue and Anne walks out. We then see Sellers' second transformation, this time in drag as Anne, who is dubbing the breakup to make it look as though they had reconciled.

Sellers returns home to Peg's care to recuperate after the divorce and begins to see Maurice Woodruff, a clairvoyant to the stars, hoping to gain some direction; Woodruff's influence leads him to the Pink Panther series. Filming of The Pink Panther begins and his portrayal is a huge success, but Sellers is disappointed with the final product and blames Blake Edwards.

Sellers returns to England to find his father on life support, which Peg had been keeping from him. After Bill says how proud he is of his son, he dies. Sellers is heartbroken and cannot forgive Peg for not calling him. Stanley Kubrick persuades Sellers to be in his new film, Dr. Strangelove. Peg comes to visit Sellers on set, but Sellers decides to stay in character as the titular scientist to avoid confronting reality. Peg is unsettled and eventually leaves, feeling as though she has not truly seen her son.

While Kubrick and Sellers are discussing the fourth character he is due to play, Sellers grows aggravated about his workload, insisting he will not play the American bomber pilot. After he storms off, we watch the third change; Sellers becomes Kubrick, who turns to look at us with the Kubrick stare and tells us that Peter Sellers was not a person, simply a vessel, “but even an empty vessel can become too full”.

Maurice Woodruff takes a bribe to convince Sellers to do another Pink Panther film, using Edwards's initials "BE" as a hint. Sellers misinterprets it and instead pursues his new neighbour, Britt Ekland. He asks her to be his date at the cinema where they see Dr. Strangelove. They marry just ten days after meeting. While on their honeymoon, Sellers inhales amyl nitrites during sex, causing him to have a series of eight heart attacks. He is rushed to the hospital and Peg watches the breaking news of Sellers' critical condition. During the resuscitation, a dream sequence takes place in Sellers' consciousness with his many characters surrounding him, before he notices that he has a ticking bomb attached to his chest. When he wakes, he believes himself to now be invincible. Sellers' next film is Casino Royale, but with his new lease on life, he wants to play it straight, much to the dismay of everyone involved. He abandons the film after no-one takes him seriously.

Ekland informs Sellers that she is pregnant. Sellers, who doesn't want more children, suggests an abortion. Ekland insists on keeping the baby. Once the baby is born, Sellers and Ekland's relationship becomes strained and they fight as the newborn interrupts scenes of After The Fox.

Sellers receives a call from Peg, who tells Sellers that she is in the hospital and that she needs to see him. Sellers pretends to be called away and hangs up. The fourth narrative change is Sellers becoming Peg, who defends Sellers' behaviour, just as the real Peg always did. As Peg, he climbs into a coffin before reverting to himself. At Peg's funeral Ekland tries to comfort Sellers, but he instead cries on his first wife Anne's shoulder. When they get home, Sellers antagonises Ekland while she tries to comfort him. A physical fight ensues and Ekland smashes a picture of Peg over Sellers' head. She leaves for good, taking their daughter with her, and Sellers is alone with his thoughts, triggering a psychedelic sequence that swiftly takes Sellers through the 1970s.

During one of their sessions, Woodruff listens to Sellers talk about his obsession with Being There, a book Sellers loves so much that he wants it to be his next film. Woodruff uses the spirit of Peg to persuade Sellers to instead make The Pink Panther Strikes Again and a superstitious Sellers relents. At the screening for the film, a drunken Sellers gives a speech which becomes more and more uninhibited until he abruptly leaves. Watching his home movies alone, Sellers gets a voicemail from his now adult son Michael, who wishes him well with his new pacemaker. Once the recording ends, Sellers looks to the table beside him and opens the script for Revenge of the Pink Panther. In costume as the "old salty Swedish sea dog", Sellers collapses in his trailer while an unaware Edwards bangs at his door. The fifth and final transformation is Sellers into Blake Edwards, who tells us what it is like to work with the "difficult" but "mesmerising" Peter Sellers.

Sellers continues his efforts to make Being There. Scenes of Sellers carefully constructing the main character in his home are interspersed with him destroying his memorabilia, including some of his home movies. He is exasperated that he cannot find the look of Chance but meditates on the memory of his lowly father and bases the look on him.

Sellers quietly rewatches scenes from Being There, proud of something he made. A tired and visibly aged Sellers walks through the Swiss snow to meet with Blake Edwards, who has the script for The Romance of the Pink Panther. Instead of entering, Sellers hesitates and watches through the window, eventually turning to stand motionless under a streetlight. Edwards comes out, confused to find Sellers standing perfectly still. They do not share a word and Edwards kisses Sellers on the cheek, eventually leaving him alone. Facts about the final years of Sellers' life are shown over the motionless Peter in the snow.

The film finishes with the same version of Peter Sellers shown at the start. He sits in the director's chair and shrugs, stands up, and walks through the film's set pieces, surrounded by bustling crew, to his trailer and says to the camera, "You can't come in here."

== Cast ==
- Geoffrey Rush as Peter Sellers (would also appear as Stanley Kubrick, Blake Edwards, Bill Sellers, Peg Sellers, and (scene deleted) Dr Lyle Wexler in asides; and as Inspector Jacques Clouseau, Duchess Gloriana XII, Fred Kite, President Merkin Muffley, Clare Quilty, Harry Robinson and Dr. Strangelove in a dream sequence).
- Charlize Theron as Britt Ekland
- Emily Watson as Anne Sellers
- John Lithgow as Blake Edwards
- Miriam Margolyes as Peg Sellers
- Peter Vaughan as Bill Sellers
- James Bentley as Michael Sellers
- Sonia Aquino as Sophia Loren
- Stanley Tucci as Stanley Kubrick
- Stephen Fry as Maurice Woodruff
- Henry Goodman as Dennis Selinger
- Alison Steadman as Casting Agent
- Edward Tudor-Pole as Spike Milligan
- Steve Pemberton as Harry Secombe
- Nigel Havers as David Niven
- David Robb as Dr Lyle Wexler
- Mackenzie Crook as Car Salesman
- Lance Ellington as Ray Ellington
- Lucy Punch as Stewardess
- Heidi Klum as Ursula Andress
- Joseph Long as Carlo Ponti
- Sam Dastor as Hal Ashby
- Mona Hammond as Ruth Attaway / Louise the Maid
- Richard Ayoade as Photographer at Wedding
- Tom Wu as Burt Kwouk
- Emilia Fox as Lynne Frederick (scenes deleted, appears as an extra in the final cut)
- Osmund Bullock as Newscaster

== Production ==
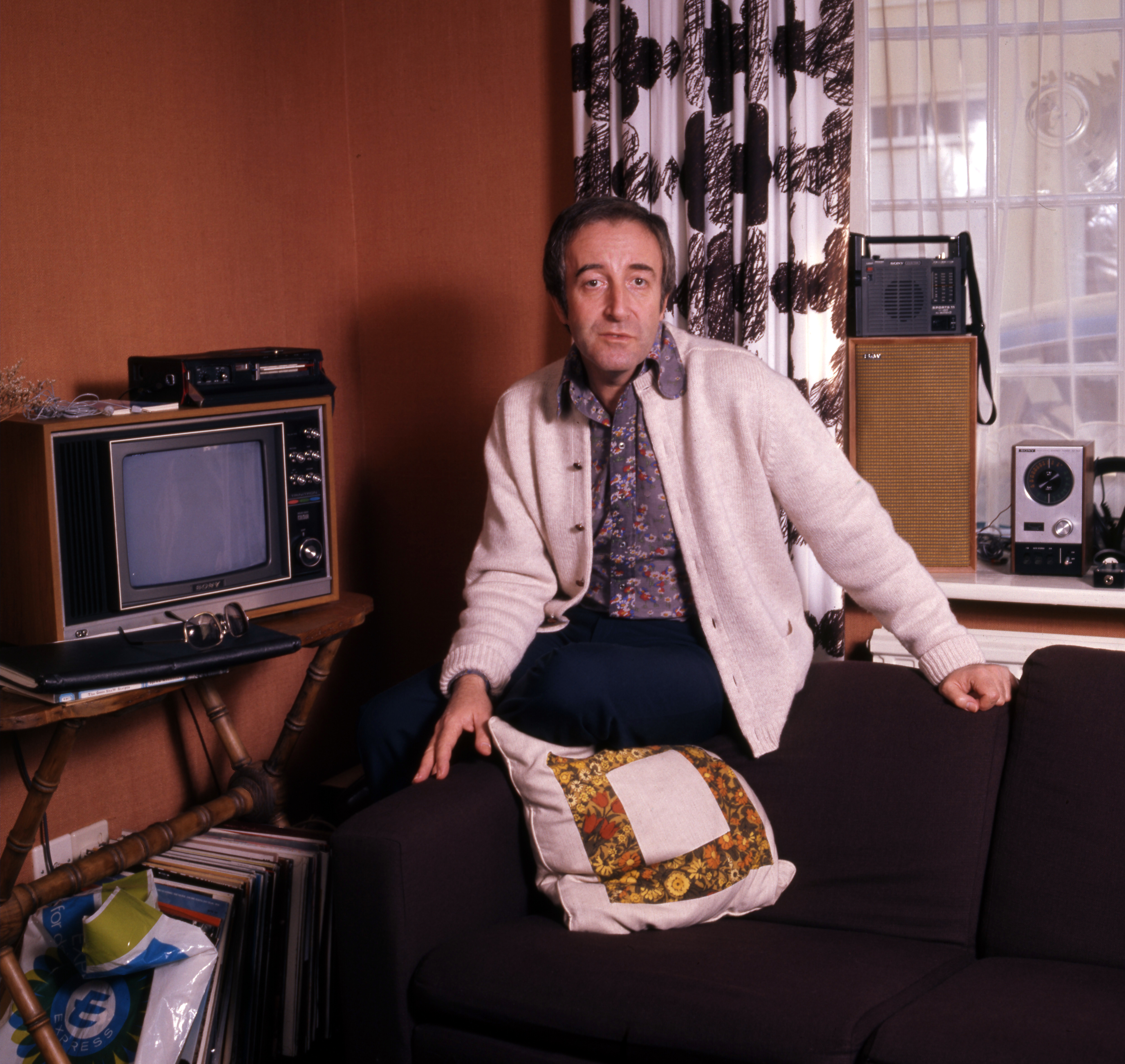
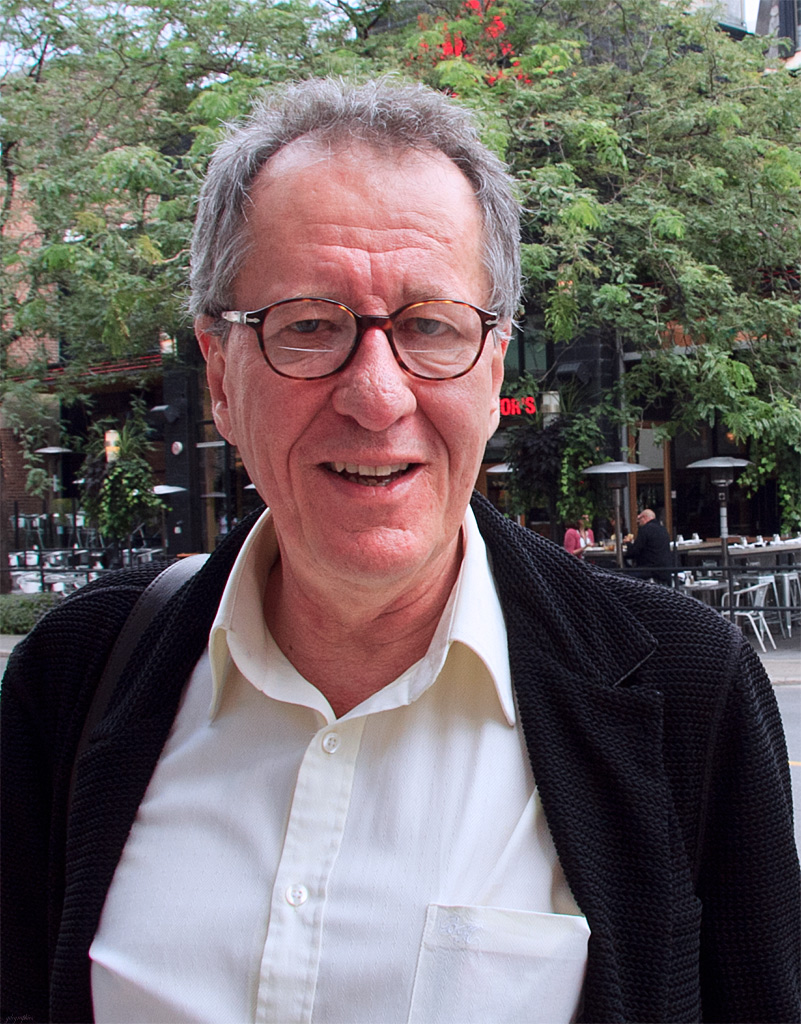
Peter Sellers and Geoffrey Rush.

The role of Sellers was portrayed by Geoffrey Rush, "who approached the role with the enthusiasm of a hungry child in a candy store", notes a reviewer. Rush impersonates most of the important characters that Sellers played in his film career. Director Blake Edwards is played by John Lithgow, and the film exposes some of the behind-the-scenes personality conflicts between Sellers and Edwards, which contributed to their unhappy and tumultuous working relationship, despite the success of their films. In the interview for the film, included on the DVD, Edwards credited Rush with portraying Sellers' characters with uncanny similarity to the real Peter Sellers, and in 2004 claimed that it was the best acting he had ever seen Rush perform.

A few of the scenes where Geoffrey Rush as Peter plays other roles, a core storytelling device in the film.

Rush stated in interviews that the film was itself structured to be reminiscent of a Peter Sellers film. However, it was darker than Sellers' actual films since it depicted Sellers' troubled experiences in his life (including his tantrums and mental instability). This included at various times Rush (as Sellers) dressing up to play other characters in his life (several were ultimately edited out, but are included within the special features on the DVD). In these instances he broke the fourth wall to give a monologue to the audience.

Roger Lewis: "It was the melancholia of Sellers I was drawn to; all those shuffling little ghostly figures he used to play in Boulting brothers films, or Clouseau, with those soulful, mournful brown eyes. For all the success and the women, he is rather a lonely and melancholic figure. And that is what redeems him." Hollywood was immediately interested in adapting Lewis's biography. In the mid-1990s Madonna's company Maverick bought the rights, but the Sellers project did not get off the ground. Many different writers worked on the screenplay, among them Lee Hall; eventually the writers Christopher Markus and Stephen McFeely came up with a script to tell the story. Director Stephen Hopkins ultimately distanced himself from Lewis's book, and said he was inspired by Sellers' 16mm home movies, which were featured in a 1995 BBC Arena documentary, "The Peter Sellers Story", directed by Peter Lydon.

== Release ==
Although intended as a television production, the film was given a limited theatrical release in the United Kingdom and was also theatrically released in a number of other countries including Spain, Italy, Iceland, Ireland, New Zealand and Australia. The film achieved its highest theatrical success in Australia, earning over US$1 million at the box office.

== Reception ==
On Rotten Tomatoes the film has an approval rating of 69% based on reviews from 26 critics. The site's critics consensus states: "The Life and Death of Peter Sellers struggles to truly capture its subject's singular genius, but remains a diverting tribute -- and a showcase for the talents of Geoffrey Rush."

The Belfast Telegraph notes how the film captured Sellers' "life of drugs, drink, fast cars and lots and lots of beautiful women". Todd McCarthy of Variety wrote: "Sustains interest most of the way, but combination of an unsympathetic central figure and patchy recreation of events involving numerous famous people makes for an ambitiously told life story that finally doesn't cut it."

=== Accolades ===
Year	Award	Category	Nominee(s)	Result	Ref.
2004	British Independent Film Awards	Best Actor	Geoffrey Rush	Nominated	
2004	British Independent Film Awards	Best Screenplay	Christopher Markus and Stephen McFeely	Nominated	
2004	Cannes Film Festival	Palme d'Or	Stephen Hopkins	Nominated	
2004	Irish Film & Television Awards	Best Animation	VooDooDog	Nominated	
2005	AARP Movies for Grownups Awards	Best TV Movie		Nominated	
2005	American Cinema Editors Awards	Best Edited Miniseries or Motion Picture for Non-Commercial Television	John Smith	Nominated	
2005	American Society of Cinematographers Awards	Outstanding Achievement in Cinematography in Movies of the Week/ Mini-Series/Pilot (Basic or Pay)	Peter Levy	Nominated	
2005	Critics' Choice Awards	Best Picture Made for Television		Won	
2005	Golden Globe Awards	Best Miniseries or Television Film		Won	
2005	Golden Globe Awards	Best Actor – Miniseries or Television Film	Geoffrey Rush	Won	
2005	Golden Globe Awards	Best Supporting Actress – Series, Miniseries or Television Film	Charlize Theron	Nominated	
2005	Golden Globe Awards	Best Supporting Actress – Series, Miniseries or Television Film	Emily Watson	Nominated	
2005	Golden Reel Awards	Best Sound Editing in Television Long Form – Dialogue and ADR	Tim Hands, Victoria Brazier, Zack Davis, Laura Lovejoy, and Anna MacKenzie	Won	
2005	Golden Reel Awards	Best Sound Editing in Television Long Form – Sound Effects and Foley	Tim Hands, Geoffrey G. Rubay, and James Mather	Nominated	
2005	London Film Critics Circle Awards	Actor of the Year	Geoffrey Rush	Nominated	
2005	Online Film & Television Association Awards	Best Motion Picture Made for Television		Won	
2005	Online Film & Television Association Awards	Best Actor in a Motion Picture or Miniseries	Geoffrey Rush	Won	
2005	Online Film & Television Association Awards	Best Supporting Actress in a Motion Picture or Miniseries	Charlize Theron	Nominated	
2005	Online Film & Television Association Awards	Best Supporting Actress in a Motion Picture or Miniseries	Emily Watson	Won	
2005	Online Film & Television Association Awards	Best Direction of a Motion Picture or Miniseries	Stephen Hopkins	Won	
2005	Online Film & Television Association Awards	Best Writing of a Motion Picture or Miniseries	Christopher Markus and Stephen McFeely	Won	
2005	Online Film & Television Association Awards	Best Ensemble in a Motion Picture or Miniseries		Won	
2005	Online Film & Television Association Awards	Best Costume Design in a Motion Picture or Miniseries		Nominated	
2005	Online Film & Television Association Awards	Best Editing in a Motion Picture or Miniseries		Won	
2005	Online Film & Television Association Awards	Best Lighting in a Motion Picture or Miniseries		Nominated	
2005	Online Film & Television Association Awards	Best Makeup/Hairstyling in a Motion Picture or Miniseries		Won	
2005	Online Film & Television Association Awards	Best Music in a Motion Picture or Miniseries	Richard Hartley	Nominated	
2005	Online Film & Television Association Awards	Best Production Design in a Motion Picture or Miniseries		Nominated	
2005	Online Film & Television Association Awards	Best Sound in a Motion Picture or Miniseries		Nominated	
2005	Online Film & Television Association Awards	Best New Titles Sequence in a Series, Motion Picture or Miniseries		Nominated	
2005	Primetime Emmy Awards	Outstanding Made for Television Movie	Freddy DeMann, George Faber, Charles Pattinson, David M. Thompson, and Simon Bosanquet	Nominated	
2005	Primetime Emmy Awards	Outstanding Lead Actor in a Miniseries or a Movie	Geoffrey Rush	Won	
2005	Primetime Emmy Awards	Outstanding Supporting Actress in a Miniseries or a Movie	Charlize Theron	Nominated	
2005	Primetime Emmy Awards	Outstanding Directing for a Miniseries, Movie or a Dramatic Special	Stephen Hopkins	Won	
2005	Primetime Emmy Awards	Outstanding Writing for a Miniseries, Movie or a Dramatic Special	Christopher Markus and Stephen McFeely	Won	
2005	Primetime Emmy Awards	Outstanding Art Direction for a Miniseries or Movie	Norman Garwood, Chris Lowe, Lucy Richardson, John Ralph, and Maggie Gray	Nominated	
2005	Primetime Emmy Awards	Outstanding Casting for a Miniseries, Movie or Special	Nina Gold	Nominated	
2005	Primetime Emmy Awards	Outstanding Cinematography for a Miniseries or Movie	Peter Levy	Won	
2005	Primetime Emmy Awards	Outstanding Costumes for a Miniseries, Movie or a Special	Jill Taylor and Charlotte Sewell	Nominated	
2005	Primetime Emmy Awards	Outstanding Hairstyling for a Miniseries, Movie or a Special	Veronica McAleer, Ashley Johnson, and Enzo Angileri	Won	
2005	Primetime Emmy Awards	Outstanding Main Title Design	Andrew White, John Sunter, Paul Donnellon, and David Z. Obadiah	Nominated	
2005	Primetime Emmy Awards	Outstanding Prosthetic Makeup for a Series, Miniseries, Movie or a Special	Davy Jones and Wesley Wofford	Won	
2005	Primetime Emmy Awards	Outstanding Single-Camera Picture Editing for a Miniseries or a Movie	John Smith	Won	
2005	Primetime Emmy Awards	Outstanding Sound Editing for a Miniseries, Movie or a Special	Tim Hands, Geoffrey G. Rubay, James Mather, Victoria Brazier, Zack Davis, Laura Lovejoy, Anna MacKenzie, Richard Ford, Felicity Cottrell, and Ruth Sullivan	Won	
2005	Primetime Emmy Awards	Outstanding Single-Camera Sound Mixing for a Miniseries or a Movie	Simon Kaye, Rick Ash, and Adam Jenkins	Nominated	
2005	Primetime Emmy Awards	Outstanding Special Visual Effects for a Miniseries, Movie or a Special	Joe Pavlo, Barrie Hemsley, Paul Tuersley, Andrew MacLeod, Andy Fowler, Camille Cellucci, Mark Intravartolo, Robin Huffer, and Neil Culley	Won	
2005	Satellite Awards	Best Motion Picture Made for Television		Nominated	
2005	Satellite Awards	Best Actor in a Miniseries or Motion Picture Made for Television	Geoffrey Rush	Nominated	
2005	Satellite Awards	Best Actress in a Supporting Role in a Series, Miniseries or Motion Picture Made for Television	Emily Watson	Nominated	
2005	Screen Actors Guild Awards	Outstanding Performance by a Male Actor in a Miniseries or Television Movie	Geoffrey Rush	Won	
2005	Screen Actors Guild Awards	Outstanding Performance by a Female Actor in a Miniseries or Television Movie	Charlize Theron	Nominated	
2005	Television Critics Association Awards	Outstanding Achievement in Movies, Miniseries and Specials		Nominated	
2006	Cinema Audio Society Awards	Outstanding Achievement in Sound Mixing for Television Movies and Miniseries	Simon Kaye, Rick Ash, and Adam Jenkins	Won	
2006	Costume Designers Guild Awards	Outstanding Period/Fantasy Television Series	Jill Taylor	Won	
2006	Directors Guild of America Awards	Outstanding Directorial Achievement in Movies for Television or Miniseries	Stephen Hopkins	Nominated	
2006	Producers Guild of America Awards	David L. Wolper Award for Outstanding Producer of Long-Form Television	Freddy DeMann, George Faber, and Charles Pattinson	Won	
2006	Writers Guild of America Awards	Long Form – Adapted	Christopher Markus and Stephen McFeely; Based on the book by Roger Lewis	Won	
