= Mark Burns (actor) =

English actor (1936–2007)

- Born: 30 March 1936; Bromsgrove, Worcestershire, England
- Died: 8 May 2007 (aged 71); London, England
- Years active: 1960–2007
- Spouses: Jane How (m. 1976; div. 1983); Paulene Stone (m. 1995)
- Children: 1

Mark Burns (30 March 1936 – 8 May 2007) was an English film and television actor.

== Biography ==
Burns was born in Bromsgrove, Worcestershire and educated at Ampleforth College, North Yorkshire. He originally planned to enter the priesthood, but after a short-service commission with the 15th/19th The King's Royal Hussars (1955–57), in which he served in Malaya and Northern Ireland, he became an actor.

His career began in 1960 with the film Tunes of Glory followed by the TV series Lorna Doone (1963) and Rupert of Hentzau (1964). One of his most prominent roles was as the male lead in the cult 1966 mystery film Death Is a Woman. Burns also appeared in The Saint episode "The Scales of Justice", and The Prisoner episode "It's Your Funeral" as Number Two's assistant.

He played William Morris in The Charge of the Light Brigade (1968), Bernie in A Day at the Beach (1970), the pianist Alfred in Death in Venice (1971) and Hans von Bülow in Ludwig (1972). Mark Burns obtained a lead role in House of the Living Dead by Ray Austin in 1974 and won the prize for best actor in 1974 at the Sitges Film Festival. In 1975, together with Lynne Frederick he did A Long Return by Pedro Lazaga. He also appeared in Count Dracula (1977) and The Bitch (1979).

His career stagnated in the 1980s and 1990s, his last film being Stardust (2007). He died from lung cancer.

== Filmography ==
=== Film ===
Year	Title	Role	Notes
1960	Sink the Bismarck!	Naval Rating in Phone Montage	Uncredited
1960	Tunes of Glory	One of the Other Officers	
1960	Exodus	Lt. O'Hara	
1962	A Prize of Arms	Lt. Ellison	
1963	The Day and the Hour	Un aviateur anglais	
1963	Take Me Over	Bill Light	
1964	The System	Michael	Uncredited
1966	Death Is a Woman	Dennis Parbury	
1967	The Jokers	Capt. Browning	
1967	It!	First Officer	
1967	I'll Never Forget What's'isname	Michael Cornwall	
1968	The Charge of the Light Brigade	Capt. William Morris	
1970	The Virgin and the Gypsy	Major Eastwood	
1970	The Adventures of Gerard	Col. Russell	Coldstream Guards
1971	Death in Venice	Alfred	
1972	A Time for Loving	Geoff Rolling	
1972	A Day at the Beach	Bernie	
1973	Ludwig	Hans Von Bülow	
1973	Giordano Bruno	Bellarmino	
1974	House of the Living Dead	Sir Michael Brattling / Dr. Breckinridge Brattling	
1974	Juggernaut	Hollingsworth	
1975	Rosebud	Shute	
1975	The Maids	Monsieur	
1975	A Long Return	David Ortega	
1977	Count Dracula	Dr. John Seward	
1978	The Stud	Leonard	
1979	The Bitch	Leonard Grant	
1979	Home Before Midnight	Harry Wilshire	
1981	Eyewitness	Man on TV	
1981	La chanson du mal aimé		
1983	The Wicked Lady	King Charles II	
1984	Champions	Thorne	
1984	The Surrogate	Larry	
1986	Keeping Track	Reporter at Bank	
1990	Destroying Angel	Reynold Turot	
1990	Bullseye!	Nigel Holden	
1993	Dirty Weekend	Mr. Brown	
1995	Savage Hearts	Doctor	
1999	The Clandestine Marriage	Capstick	
2007	Stardust	New Bishop	Final film role (posthumous release)

=== Television ===
Year	Title	Role	Notes
1960	ITV Sunday Night Drama	Lieutenant Barnaby	Episode: "The Devil Makes Sunday"
1961	Storyboard	Spy in Bowler Hat	Episode: "Tickets to Trieste"
1961	Probation Officer	Dominic Woodruff	1 episode
1962	Studio 4	Marston	Episode: "The Grass Is Singing"
1962	Z-Cars	Mike Jevons	Episode: "Further Enquiries"
1962	Saki	Clovis Sangrail	8 episodes
1962	Harpers West One	Dennis Scott	1 episode
1963	The Third Man	Robert Fletcher	Episode: "A King's Ransom"
1963	Richard the Lionheart	Alan	Episode: "The Caveman"
1963	Lorna Doone	Charlesworth Doone	7 episodes
1964	Rupert of Hentzau	Lieutenant Bernenstein	5 episodes
1964	The Human Jungle	Businessman (uncredited)	Episode: "Struggle for a Mind"
1964	The Sullavan Brothers	Lieutenant Stacey	Episode: "One for the Day of Judgement"
1964	Compact	George Harvest	Episode: "Moving On"
1964	Redcap	Captain The Honorable Ian Loder	Episode: "The Orderly Officer"
1965	The Flying Swan	Eric Stanton	Episode: "The Streets"
1965	Undermind	Captain Morrell	Episode: "Death in England"
1965	Armchair Mystery Theatre	Dr. Gregg	Episode: "Wake a Stranger"
1966	The Baron	Peter Langley	Episode: "Portrait of Louisa"
1966	Sergeant Cork	Lord Fotherwell	Episode: "The Case of the Unpopular Judge"
1966	Mystery and Imagination	Tom Whistlewick	Episode: "The Flying Dragon"
1967	No Hiding Place	Ronnie Westlake	Episode: "A Letter from Helga"
1967	Theatre 625	Tony Box-Bender / William	2 episodes
1967	The Prisoner	Number Two's Assistant	Episode: "It's Your Funeral"
1968	The Saint	Elliott Stratton	Episode: "The Scales of Justice"
1972	Spy Trap	Peter Royce	2 episodes
1972	The Main Chance	Warren Iveson	Episode: "One for the House"
1976	The New Avengers	Spence	Episode: "House of Cards"
1977	Secret Army	Dieter Gundell	Episode: "Lisa - Codename Yvette"
1979	Play for Today	Ramage	Episode: "Degree of Uncertainty"
1980	Cribb	John Fernandez	Episode: "Swing, Swing Together"
1983	Bergerac	Patrick Lister	Episode: "A Perfect Recapture"
1983	Goodnight and God Bless	Nigel	Episode: "Ronnie's Wonderful Day"
1983	Wagner	Baron von Hulsen	1 episode
1983	By the Sword Divided	Captain Charles Pike	6 episodes
