= Merlin and the Sword =

- Genre: Adventure; Fantasy; Mystery; Romance
- Based on: Arthurian legend
- Written by: David Wyles
- Directed by: Clive Donner
- Starring: Malcolm McDowell; Candice Bergen; Edward Woodward; Dyan Cannon
- Music by: Charles Gross
- Country of origin: United States
- Original language: English

Production
- Producers: Martin Poll; Kathryn Stellmack; David White
- Production locations: Pinewood Studios, Iver Heath, Buckinghamshire, England; Yugoslavia
- Cinematography: Dennis C. Lewiston
- Editor: Peter Tanner
- Running time: 180 minutes (TV broadcast); 94 minutes (home video)
- Production companies: Martin Poll Productions; Comworld Productions; Jadran Film

Original release
- Network: CBS
- Release: April 26, 1985

Merlin and the Sword is a 1985 American made-for-television fantasy adventure sword and sorcery film based on the Arthurian legend. It was released in some regions as Arthur the King.

== Plot ==
A woman named Katherine falls into an icy cave at Stonehenge and wakes up in Arthurian times. King Arthur's wife Guinevere is kidnapped by his evil sister Morgan Le Fay. Lancelot is sent out to try to retrieve the lost queen and ends up falling in love with her.

== Cast ==
- Malcolm McDowell as King Arthur
- Candice Bergen as Morgan Le Fay
- Edward Woodward as Merlin
- Dyan Cannon as Katherine
- Joseph Blatchley as Mordred
- Rupert Everett as Lancelot
- Rosalyn Landor as Guinevere
- Liam Neeson as Grak
- Patrick Ryecart as Gawain
- Philip Sayer as Agravain
- Ann Thornton as Lady Ragnell
- Lucy Gutteridge as Niniane
- Denis Lill as King Pellinore
- Michael Gough as Archbishop

== Production ==
The movie was originally filmed in 1982 but was unable to secure airtime until April 26, 1985. It became available on disc April 15, 1992.

== Broadcast history ==
It was first released in the Philippines on January 5, 1985, followed by a broadcast in the USA on April 26, 1985.

== See also ==
- List of films based on Arthurian legend
