= Shaun Curry =

British actor (1937–2009)

- Born: 5 June 1937
- Died: 7 July 2009 (aged 72)
- Citizenship: British citizen
- Education: RADA
- Occupation: Actor
- Television: Doctor Who, Z-Cars, The Sweeney, The Bill

Shaun Curry (5 June 1937 – 7 July 2009) was a British actor, best known for his appearances on television.

His credits include: Z-Cars, The Saint, Up Pompeii!, Warship, The Sweeney, The New Avengers, Secret Army, Poldark, To the Manor Born, The Professionals, Blake's 7, Fox, Hot Money, Minder, Terry and June, The Gentle Touch, The Bill, Grange Hill, Just Good Friends, London's Burning and Holby City.

Educated in part at Buckingham College, Harrow, Served in the Grenadier Guards.

Graduating from RADA in 1961, his theatre roles included work in rep, with the RSC, in the West End, and with the National Theatre.

== Selected filmography ==
- Death Is a Woman (1966) as Joe
- Up the Junction (1968) as Ted
- Nobody Runs Forever (1968) as reporter (uncredited)
- The Fiction Makers (1968) as guard, gamekeeper
- The Last Shot You Hear (1969) as driver
- The Spy's Wife (1972) as chauffeur
- From Beyond the Grave (1974) as 1st workman (segment 4 "The Door") (uncredited)
- A Bridge Too Far (1977) as Corporal Robbins
- Let's Get Laid (1978) as Greenleaf
- The Empire Strikes Back (1980) as Hoth Rebel Commander (uncredited)
- The Guns and the Fury (1981) as Major Wayne-Smith
- The Year of the Bodyguard (1982) as interviewed policeman
- The Doctor and the Devils (1985) as policeman
