= Maurice Woodruff =

English astrologer

Maurice Woodruff (2 April 1916 – 28 January 1973) was an English clairvoyant and astrologer, born and raised in London. He achieved considerable fame in England. He presented his predictions to the public via newspapers and also via stage, cabaret and television appearances. His claims were disputed by sceptics.

== Biography ==
In addition to his appearances on British television, Maurice hosted the hour-long programme, Maurice Woodruff Predicts, on American TV for a short run in 1969. He authored several books including The Secrets of Foretelling Your Own Future (1969), Probing the Unknown: The Personal Experiences of a Psychic (1971), and Woody (1967), a biographical account of his mother's colourful life and career. He had a considerable number of private clients including several well-known celebrities, one of the most famous of whom was the actor Peter Sellers. His mother was the clairvoyant Vera "Woody" Woodruff.

Woodruff was open about his homosexuality and had a long-term relationship with his manager Harry Arnold. He died in January 1973 after suffering a heart attack, aged 56, on a lecture tour in Singapore.

His ashes were returned to Britain where they were interred in London at Golders Green Crematorium. A memorial plaque was erected in the West Courtyard at the end of the columbarium there.

Woodruff was portrayed by Stephen Fry in the 2004 film The Life and Death of Peter Sellers.
