= Terry Fincher =

British photojournalist (1931–2008)

- Born: 8 July 1931; Aylesbury, Buckinghamshire, England
- Died: 6 October 2008 (aged 77); Guildford, Surrey, England
- Occupation: Photojournalist
- Known for: Suez CrisisVietnam War

Terry Fincher (8 July 1931 – 6 October 2008) was an award-winning British photojournalist. His career took off in 1956 when he accompanied British forces that invaded Egypt during the Suez Crisis. He later did five tours of Vietnam covering the war there for the Daily Express, as well as reporting extensively from trouble spots in the Middle East and Africa. He was British press photographer of the year for 1957, 1959, 1964, and 1967, and runner-up in 1968 (as of September 2013, a still unbeaten record).

He was the subject of This Is Your Life in 1976 when he was surprised by Eamonn Andrews.
