= The Ghosts =

1969 novel by Antonia Barber

- First edition (publ. Jonathan Cape)
- Author: Antonia Barber
- Language: English
- Genre: Children's fantasy
- Publication date: 1969
- Publication place: United Kingdom
- Media type: Print

The Ghosts is a children's fantasy novel written by Antonia Barber in 1969. It was shortlisted for the Carnegie Medal. It was filmed twice, first in 1972 as The Amazing Mr. Blunden, with a second adaptation produced in 2021. After being out of print for over three decades, a new edition of the book is scheduled for release in December 2021 by Virago Books under the title The Amazing Mr. Blunden.

== Plot summary ==
The story opens with an elderly man visiting Mrs. Allen, a widow who lives with her three children Lucy, Jamie and her baby Benjamin, in Camden Town, London. He offers her a job as caretaker of an abandoned house, which belonged to the late Mr. Latimer, until the Blunden, Blunden and Claverton company can find the rightful owner. Mrs. Allen takes the job, despite the rumours of ghosts haunting the old house.

One day, Lucy is walking in the garden to explore and to pick flowers when she hears the ghosts calling her name. She goes closer, only to discover the ghosts in person: a teenage girl and her younger brother.

Lucy and Jamie return the next day to discuss with the ghosts. It turns out their uncle is trying to "get rid of them", or murder them, and they are travelling forwards in time in order to get help. The ghosts' names are Sara and Georgie Latimer.

By drinking an infusion of various leaves, made from a recipe that Sara provides, Lucy and Jamie go back in time with the ghosts to meet Mrs. Wickens, the housekeeper and mother to Bella who is to marry Sara and Georgie's guardian, and Tom, the gardener's boy. The children also meet Mr. Blunden (who is believed to be the creator of Blunden, Blunden and Claverton company), who helps Jamie and Lucy rescue Sara and Georgie from their burning house.

Sara and Georgie had been drugged by Mrs. Wickens who wanted Georgie dead so that the children's guardian, their Uncle Bertie, would inherit instead of Georgie. Uncle Bertie was married to Bella, Mrs Wickens's daughter. The fire was started by Mr Wickens on his wife's instructions.

In the end, Jamie and Mr. Blunden travel through the fire by holding hands, and because Mr. Blunden is the one who must suffer, Jamie will not have to. They save Georgie while Sara is safely outside.

In the end, a lawyer named Mr. Smith returns to the household. It turns out Sara married Tom (the gardener boy) and emigrated to America, whilst Georgie moved to Camden Town. According to a letter sent by Sara to Georgie, her great-grandson is the late Mr. Allen, Jamie and Lucy's father, so Jamie is considered heir to the house, being Sara Latimer's great-great-grandson.

== Adaptations ==
The Ghosts was filmed in 1972 as The Amazing Mr. Blunden, directed by Lionel Jeffries and featuring Laurence Naismith as Mr. Blunden and Diana Dors as Mrs Wickens.

In June 2021, a new adaptation, written and directed by Mark Gatiss for Sky One, was announced. Mr. Blunden was played by Simon Callow. It broadcast on 24 December that year.
