= Michael Sellers (actor) =

British builder and car restorer (1954–2006)

- Born: Michael Peter Anthony Sellers; 2 April 1954; London, England
- Died: 24 July 2006 (aged 52); Oxford, Oxfordshire, England
- Occupations: Actor; author; builder
- Children: 2
- Father: Peter Sellers
- Relatives: Victoria Sellers (half-sister)

Michael Peter Anthony Sellers (2 April 1954 – 24 July 2006) was a British builder, car restorer, and author. As the eldest child and only son of actor Peter Sellers, he also had small parts in a couple of his father's films. He was often interviewed by the media about his relationship with his father. Despite a tenuous and troubled relationship with his father, he frequently defended him and his legacy.

== Life ==
Michael was Peter Sellers' son from his first marriage to actress Anne Howe. His close friend at prep school (Hall School, Hampstead) was actor Donald Sinden's son Marc. When Michael was seven years old, his parents divorced and in an interview, Marc said that Peter always behaved badly towards Michael; he also recalled seeing some of the letters Michael received from his father and concluded that he was a "really, really nasty man".

During the school year, Michael stayed with his mother and stepfather, while he spent the school holidays with his father who in turn was insecure about his relationship with his son and became vindictive; despite this, Michael remained close to his father up until his death, and they spent some enjoyable times together.

In his will Peter left Michael about £800 from his multi-million-pound estate. Michael also claimed that the £800 he received was a calculated act to prevent him from contesting the will, since under English law, as it was at the time, only complete disinheritance provided the legal grounds for a challenge of the will.

== Career ==
Sellers' film career started early when, at the age of seven, he played the role of Gaston in the film Mr. Topaze, directed by his father. As an adult, Michael became a builder and property dealer.

Sellers went on to appear in I Told You I Was Ill: The Life and Legacy of Spike Milligan (2005), a film he did in collaboration with the children of Spike Milligan. He also wrote three biographical books about his father.

Despite his turbulent relationship with his father, Michael often defended Peter's legacy. Upon the release of the 2004 film The Life and Death of Peter Sellers, based on the book of the same name by Roger Lewis, Sellers railed against Lewis and the film's director, Stephen Hopkins; Sellers was incensed at the portrayal of Peter as clinically insane. At the time, Sellers called Lewis's book "400 pages of rubbish". Hopkins responded to Sellers' comments when he appeared at the film festival to promote the film, stating that the film was not disrespectful to the comedy actor.

In 2000, Sellers produced his last book, Sellers On Sellers, where he wrote:

He had been there: starred in the movies, married the young women, driven the fast cars, taken the drugs, drunk the wine, made all the cash, spent the cash and let down all those people who had ever really cared for him.

In the 2020 BBC Two documentary A State of Comic Ecstasy, Michael's son Will said that the strained relationship between Peter and Michael, and particularly the situation with the will (greatly favouring Peter Sellers' fourth wife, Lynne Frederick, which Will claimed was "the price he [Peter] paid" to get her back after a separation), "ate [Michael] up. It played upon him throughout his life... I don't think he ever really got over how things were left with him and Peter."

== Death ==
On 24 July 2006, Michael Sellers died of a heart attack, like his father. His death occurred on the 26th anniversary of his father's death.

== Films ==
- Mr. Topaze (1961) (aka I Like Money (USA)) as Gaston
- I Told You I Was Ill: The Life and Legacy of Spike Milligan (2005) (aka The Life and Legacy of Spike Milligan), as Himself
- This Morning (one episode, 29 September 2004), as Himself
- Somebody's Daughter, Somebody's Son (Episode #1.2 (2004) TV) as Himself
- Kelly (one episode, 20 October 2000) as Himself

== Books published ==
- P.S. I Love You (1981)
- A Hard Act to Follow (with Gary Morecambe; 1996)
- Sellers on Sellers (with Gary Morecambe; 2000)
