= Victoria Sellers =

British and American model

- Born: 20 January 1965 (age 60); London, England
- Occupations: Model, actress
- Parents: Peter Sellers (father); Britt Ekland (mother)
- Relatives: Michael Sellers (half-brother)

Victoria Sellers (born 20 January 1965) is a British and American model, actress, and reality television personality.

== Early life ==
Born in London, Sellers attended Lycée Français de Los Angeles in West Los Angeles, University High School in West Los Angeles and Crossroads School for Arts and Sciences in the class of 1981. She became friends with the "Hollywood Madam" Heidi Fleiss in their teens.

She is the third and youngest child of actor Peter Sellers and his only child with his second wife, actress Britt Ekland.

A letter auctioned in 2010, one of the last documents signed by her father before his death, indicates that he was trying to increase the amount of money to be inherited by her from £800 to £20,000 (equivalent to £108,000 in 2023).

== Career ==
Sellers posed for Playboy in April 1986. In the same year she was indicted for her role in a cocaine-trafficking gang, and was placed on probation for three years.

She performed as a stand-up comic in the early 1990s. With Heidi Fleiss, she hosted and produced an instructional DVD titled Sex Tips with Heidi Fleiss and Victoria Sellers in 2001.

In 2005, Sellers began designing jewellery.

In 2009, she was the subject of episode 4 of the British reality series Rehab. In November 2013, she began filming the reality show The Eklands for Swedish television with her mother and half-brothers, Nick and T.J.
