= Antonia Barber =

English author (1932–2019)

Antonia Barber (real name Barbara Anthony; 10 December 1932 – 4 April 2019) was an English writer of books for children and adults. Barber resided in Kent and Mousehole, Cornwall. Her book The Mousehole Cat was adapted as an animated film and is being adapted as a stage musical. She graduated from University College London. The younger sister of fellow writer Pamela Oldfield, Barber was married to a structural engineer.

== Selected works ==
- The Affair of the Rockerbye Baby (1966)
- The Ghosts (1969) – filmed 1972 as The Amazing Mr Blunden and reissued 2021 as such
- The Ring in the Rough Stuff (1983)
- The Enchanter's Daughter (1987)
- Satchelmouse and the Doll's House (1987)
- The Mousehole Cat (1990)
- Tales from Grimm (1992)
- Catkin (1994)
- Apollo & Daphne: Masterpieces of Mythology (1998) – with paintings from the great art museums of the world
- Dancing Shoes series (1998 to 2000)
- Hidden Tales from Eastern Europe (2002)
- Heracles the Hero (2003)
- The Frog Bride (2007)

== Awards and recognition ==
- The Ghosts (1969)
  - Shortlisted for the Carnegie Medal
- The Ring in the Rough Stuff (1983)
  - Shortlisted for the Carnegie Medal
- The Mousehole Cat (1990)
  - Nestle Smarties Book Prize children's choice
  - British Book Award

Three illustrators have earned recognition by the British Library Association for their collaborations with Barber.

- Errol Le Cain, The Enchanter's Daughter, a commended runner-up for the 1987 Kate Greenaway Medal
- Nicola Bayley, The Mousehole Cat, a commended runner-up for the 1990 Greenaway
- P. J. Lynch, Catkin, on the shortlist for the 1994 Greenaway
